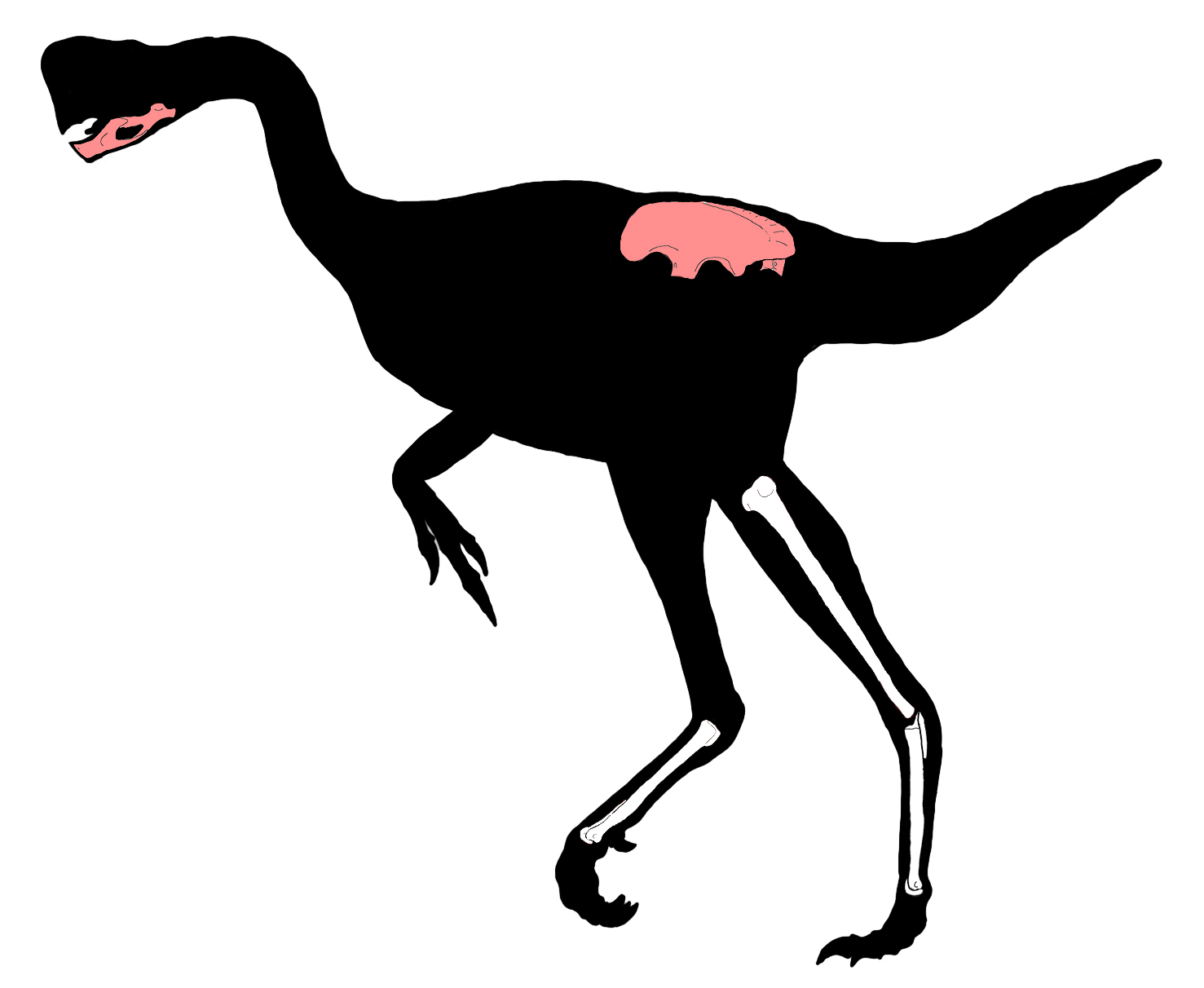
- A diagram of all known material from Citipes with the material described in 2020 shown in pink

Scientific classification
- Kingdom: Animalia
- Phylum: Chordata
- Class: Reptilia
- Clade: Dinosauria
- Clade: Saurischia
- Clade: Theropoda
- Family: †Caenagnathidae
- Subfamily: †Elmisaurinae (?)
- Genus: †Citipes; Funston, 2020

Type species
- †Ornithomimus elegans Parks, 1933

Species
- †Citipes elegans (Parks, 1933)

Synonyms
- Ornithomimus elegans Parks, 1933; Macrophalangia elegans (Parks, 1933) Russell, 1972; Elmisaurus elegans (Parks, 1933) Currie, 1989; Chirostenotes elegans (Parks, 1933) Sues, 1997; Leptorhynchos elegans (Parks, 1933) Longrich et al., 2013

= Citipes =

Citipes Temporal range: Late Cretaceous ~76.9 to 75.8 Ma - Campanian

Genus of reptiles (fossil)

Citipes (/ˈsɪtipɛz/) is an extinct genus of caenagnathid theropod from the Late Cretaceous Dinosaur Park Formation in Alberta, Canada. The genus contains only one species, the type species, C. elegans. The generic name of Citipes is Latin for "fleet-footed", and the specific epithet "elegans" is Latin for "elegant". The type specimen of Citipes has a convoluted taxonomic history, and has been previously assigned to the genera Ornithomimus, Macrophalangia, Elmisaurus, Chirostenotes, and Leptorhynchos before being given its own genus in 2020.

== Discovery and naming ==
=== Initial discovery ===
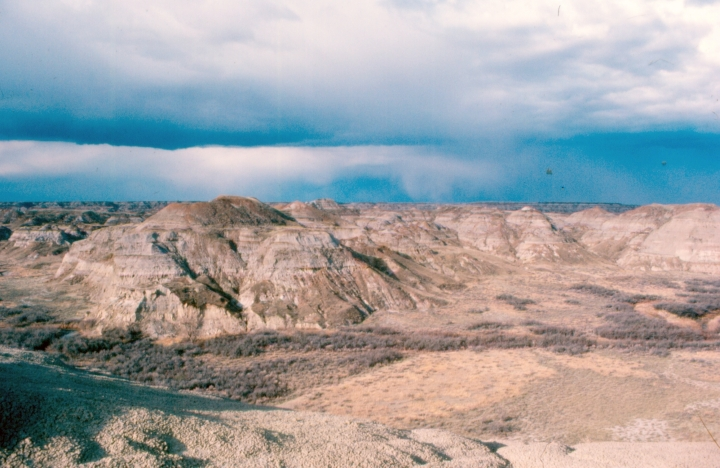
An outcrop of the Dinosaur Park Formation, where the holotype of Citipes was found

The material which would eventually be named Citipes was discovered in 1926 during one of the University of Toronto's expeditions to the Sand Creek area of the Red Deer River. This locality was a part of the Belly River Group, which is now recognized as the Dinosaur Park Formation. However, it would be another seven years before a full description of this material was published in the University of Toronto's geology journal in 1933 by Dr. William A. Parks. The material, consisting of three metatarsals, was reposited at the Royal Ontario Museum and was given the designation ROM 781.

It was named as a new species of the common genus Ornithomimus — Ornithomimus elegans. This name was assigned based on three metatarsals, which were believed to belong to an ornithomimosaur because of the lack of a fifth metatarsal bone. Oviraptorosauria was not yet recognized as a unique clade, and several oviraptorans, including Oviraptor and Chirostenotes, were believed to be ornithomimids. It would not be until 1976 that oviraptorosaurs became recognized as their own unique clade.

=== Taxonomic history ===
ROM 781 was reassigned to the dubious genus Macrophalangia by Dale Russell in 1972. However, this genus was made a junior synonym of Chirostenotes a few years later.

A more thorough re-examination of ROM 781 was conducted in 1988 by Philip J. Currie, who published a re-description of the material in the Canadian Journal of Earth Sciences. Currie referred the specimen to a new species in the recently described genus Elmisaurus — Elmisaurus elegans. He also referred two new specimens to the species. The first of these new specimens, ROM 37163, consists of a partial metatarsus and was collected sometime between the years of 1920 and 1954 by an expedition of the Royal Ontario Museum. The second, TMP 82.39.4, consists of another partial tarsometatarsus, and it was collected in 1982 by Linda Strong-Watson. Both of these specimens were discovered in the Dinosaur Park Formation and resembled the holotype enough to warrant referral.

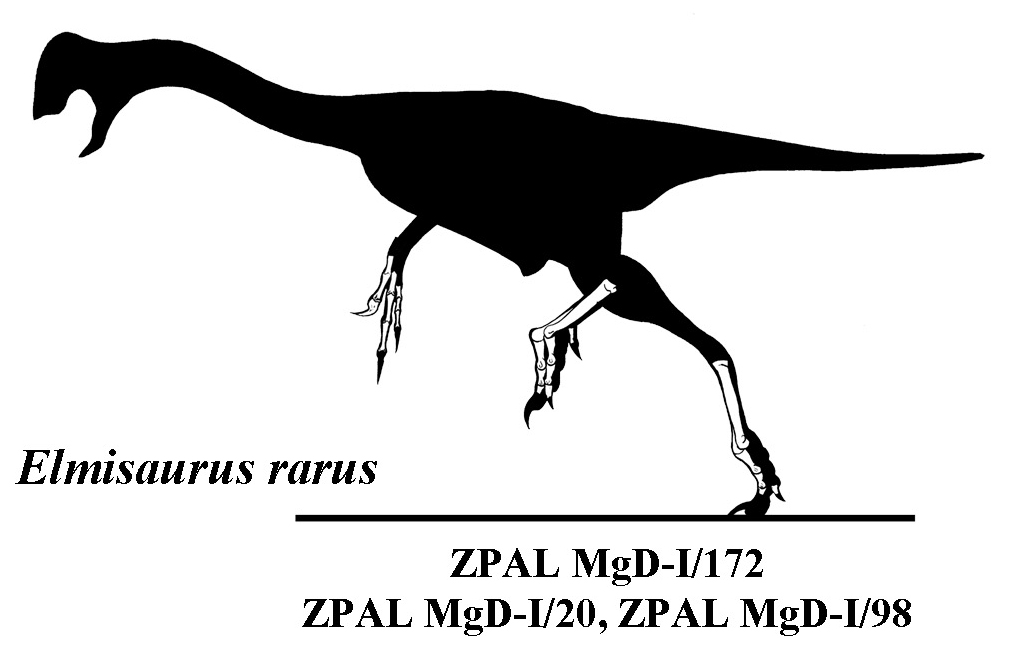

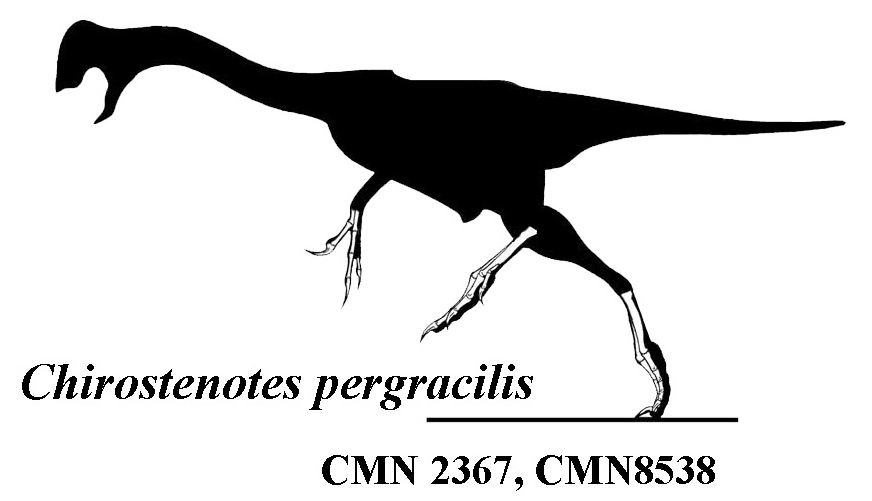
Known hand and foot remains of the genera Chirostenotes and Elmisaurus, to which Citipes was originally referred

Elmisaurus elegans was distinguished from the type species, E. rarus, by the presence of a weaker ridge on the fourth metatarsal bone, and a process on the distal ends of metatarsals II and IV. At the time of this publication, there was an ongoing debate about the validity of the caenagnathid genera Chirostenotes, Caenagnathus, and Elmisaurus, and Currie used his re-description of ROM 781 to argue that Elmisaurus was a distinct and valid genus.

The classification of ROM 781 was amended again in 1997 by Hans-Dieter Sues in 1997 when he published an extensive monograph describing a newly discovered specimen of the genus Chirostenotes. In his monograph, Sues referred Elmisaurus elegans to the genus Chirostenotes as the new species C. elegans, and he also regarded the genera Caenagnathus and Elmisaurus as subjective junior synonyms of Chirostenotes. Some specimens were referred to C. pergracilis and others to the newly erected C. elegans. Sues distinguished C. elegans from C. pergracilis by the presence of co-ossification of the second and fourth metatarsals, and it was included in the genus because Sues regarded Chirostenotes as the only valid caenagnathid genus in Campanian Laramidia.

In 2013, accompanying their description of the genus Leptorhynchos, Nicholas Longrich, Ken Barnes, Scott Clark, and Larry Millar, referred ROM 781 to their newly described genus. Their reasoning for this reassignment was the referral of additional specimens — TMP 1992.36.390, TMP 1979.8.622, TMP 1991.144.1 (all lower jaw fragments), and TMP 1982.39.4 (a partial tarsometatarsus) — to the species based on their small size in comparison with all other described caenagnathids. Hagryphus, Caenagnathus, and Chirostenotes were all much larger than the newly named Leptorhynchos, and so they moved Chirostenotes pergracilis to the new genus as the species Leptorhynchos elegans. Longrich and colleagues distinguished L. elegans from the type species, L. gaddisi, by the presence of a strongly upturned beak tip and a chin that is square-shaped in lateral view.

=== Current understanding ===
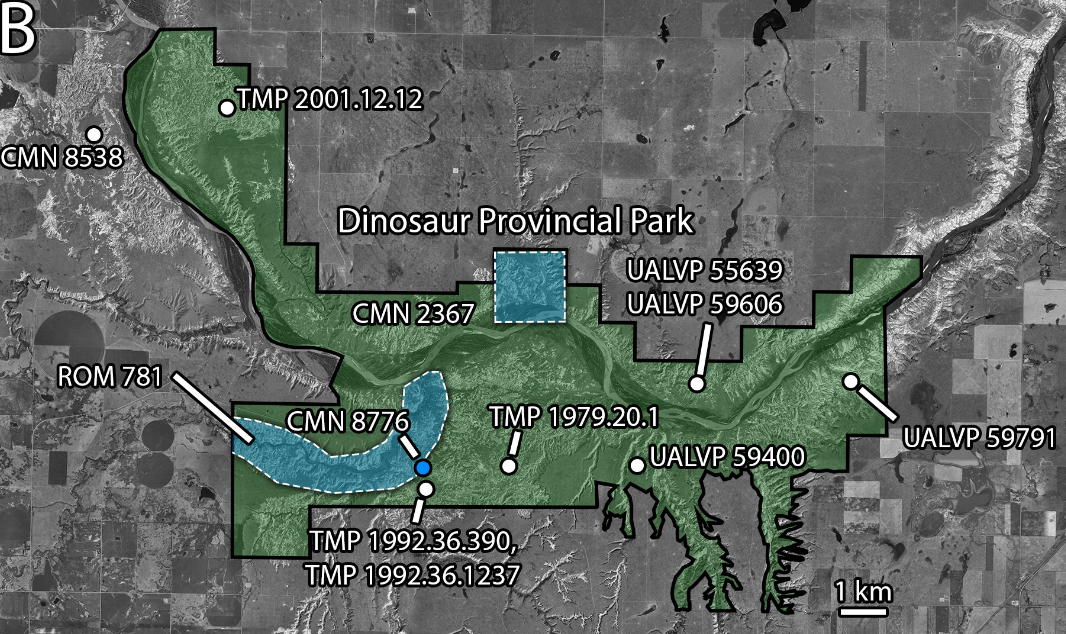
A map of caenagnathid discoveries in Dinosaur Provincial Park

In 2020, Gregory Funston conducted a review of all caenagnathid material known from the Dinosaur Park Formation in order to determine their actual diversity in that depositional environment. Funston personally examined and scored material in the collections of the Canadian Museum of Nature, the Royal Ontario Museum, the Royal Tyrell Museum, the University of Alberta, and the Mongolian Academy of Sciences. He also collected histological samples from several bones in order to examine them for "lines of arrested growth", which can be used to estimate the ontogenetic age of the specimens.

There has historically been significant uncertainty in the scientific literature as to which ontogenetic stage each of the specimens were in and whether or not the smaller caenagnathid remains belonged to juveniles or adults of smaller species. Funston's analysis resulted in revised diagnoses for Caenagnathus and Chirostenotes, which Funston argues are distinct and valid genera. This analysis also resulted in the specimens assigned to Leptorhynchos elegans, as well as some recently discovered specimens, being referred to the newly erected genus, Citipes.

Most of the caenagnathid material from the Dinosaur Park Formation was assigned to one of these three genera based on size and diagnoses were amended from the apomorphies of those specimens. Some specimens were not able to be referred to any of these genera with certainty due to the incompleteness of the remains.

== Description ==
Citipes is a small-bodied caenagnathid. In his review of Dinosaur Park caenagnathids, Gregory Funston concluded that it had a substantially smaller adult size than the contemporaneous genera Caenagnathus and Chirostenotes. Histological analysis of two metatarsals assigned to the genus indicated that the individuals that the bones came from were close to adulthood, but not yet fully matured. Funston is confident in his assessment that Citipes was relatively small in life, with adults measuring 1–2 metres (3.3–6.6 ft) long. Rubén Molina-Pérez and Asier Larramendi suggested a more specific estimate of 2.1 metres (6.9 ft) long and 82 centimetres (2.69 ft) tall at the hip with an estimated mass of 32 kilograms (71 lb).

In his comprehensive re-description of the caenagnathids from the Dinosaur Park Formation, Gregory Funston provides amended diagnoses for all three named genera in his analysis. For Citipes, he identifies several autapomorphies including: coossification of the distal ends of tarsals III and IV, a lack of posterior protrusions on the proximal ends of metatarsals II and IV, and a prominent ridge on the posterior surface of metatarsal III. These autapomorphies not only distinguish Citipes from its contemporaries, but also from the closely related genera Elmisaurus and Leptorhynchos.

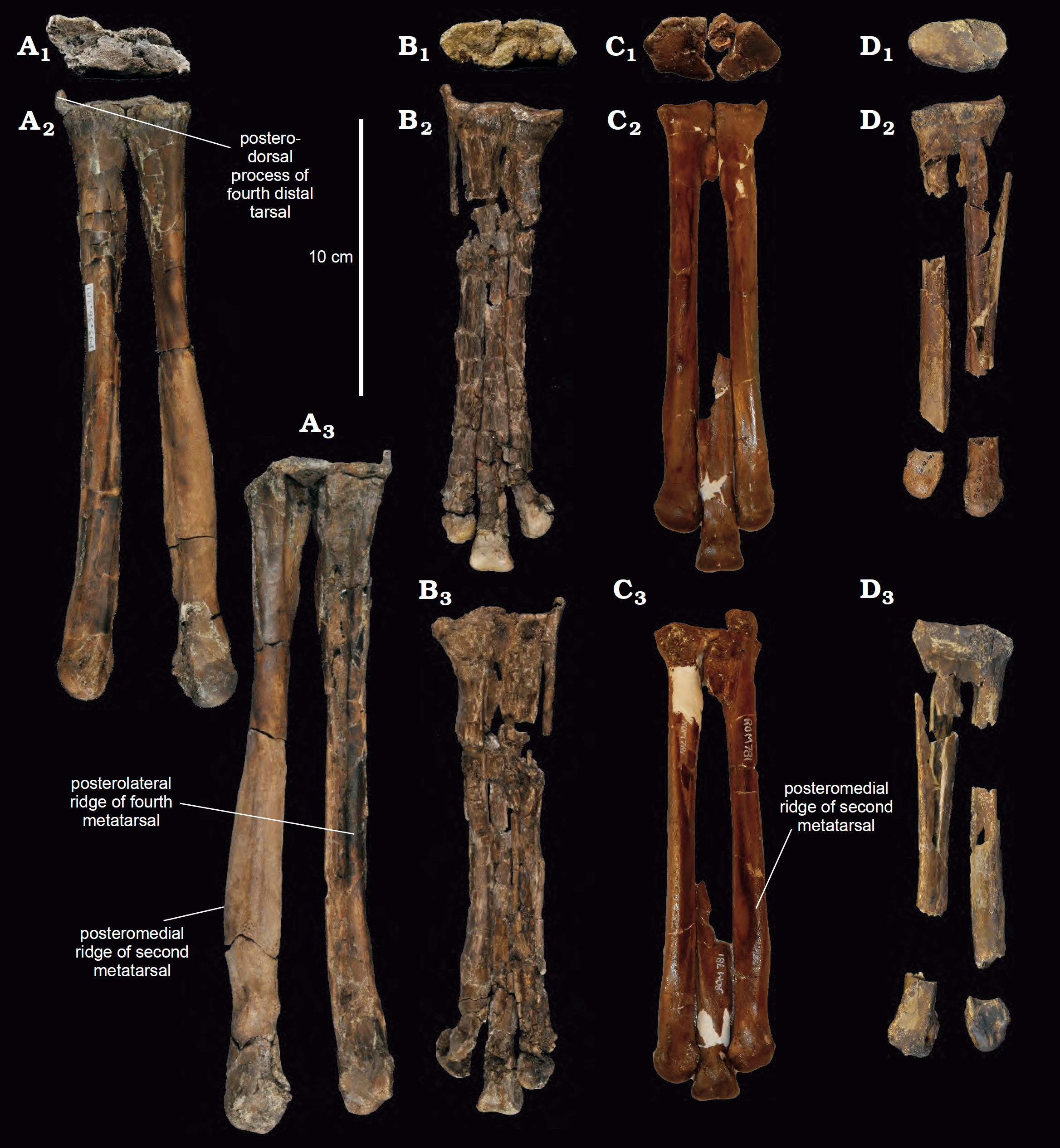
Comparison of the metatarsal elements of several caenagnathids, including the holotype of Citipes — ROM 781 (C)

Holotype

The holotype of Citipes was described in 1933 by William Parks as a species of Ornithomimus. It consists of three metatarsals which are bowed slightly inwards such that metatarsals II and IV meet at their proximal ends. The length of the metatarsals is stated by Parks as roughly 160 millimetres (6.3 in).

Referred material (1989-2013)

In 1989, the specimens ROM 37163 (distal metatarsal II) and TMP 82.39.4 (a partial tarsometatarsus) were assigned to the same taxon as ROM 781 and the diagnosis of the holotype was amended. A re-examination of the holotype led to the discovery that the metatarsals II and IV were coossified and that their separation in the holotype was taphonomic. The overall morphological similarities to Elmisaurus rarus included the shape of the bones' cross-sections and the presence of an arctometatarsus, which is what led Philip Currie to refer the species to Elmisaurus.

In 2013, Nicholas Longrich and colleagues referred additional material to the newly renamed Leptorhynchos elegans. These specimens included several bones of the lower jaws as well as newly discovered tarsometatarsal elements. They also erected TMP 1992.36.290 (the anterior half of two dentaries) as the paratype of the species. In their re-assignment, Longrich and colleagues distinguished L. elegans from the genera to which it was assigned previously (Elmisaurus and Chirostenotes) due to its small size, which they believed was not reflective of its ontogenetic age because of the fusion of the tarsal elements. They also remark that the dentaries of L. elegans — exemplified by the specimens TMP 1992.36.390, TMP 1979.8.622, and TMP 1991.144.1 — differ substantially from other caenagnathids in their relatively short length and the upturned nature of the dentary symphysis.

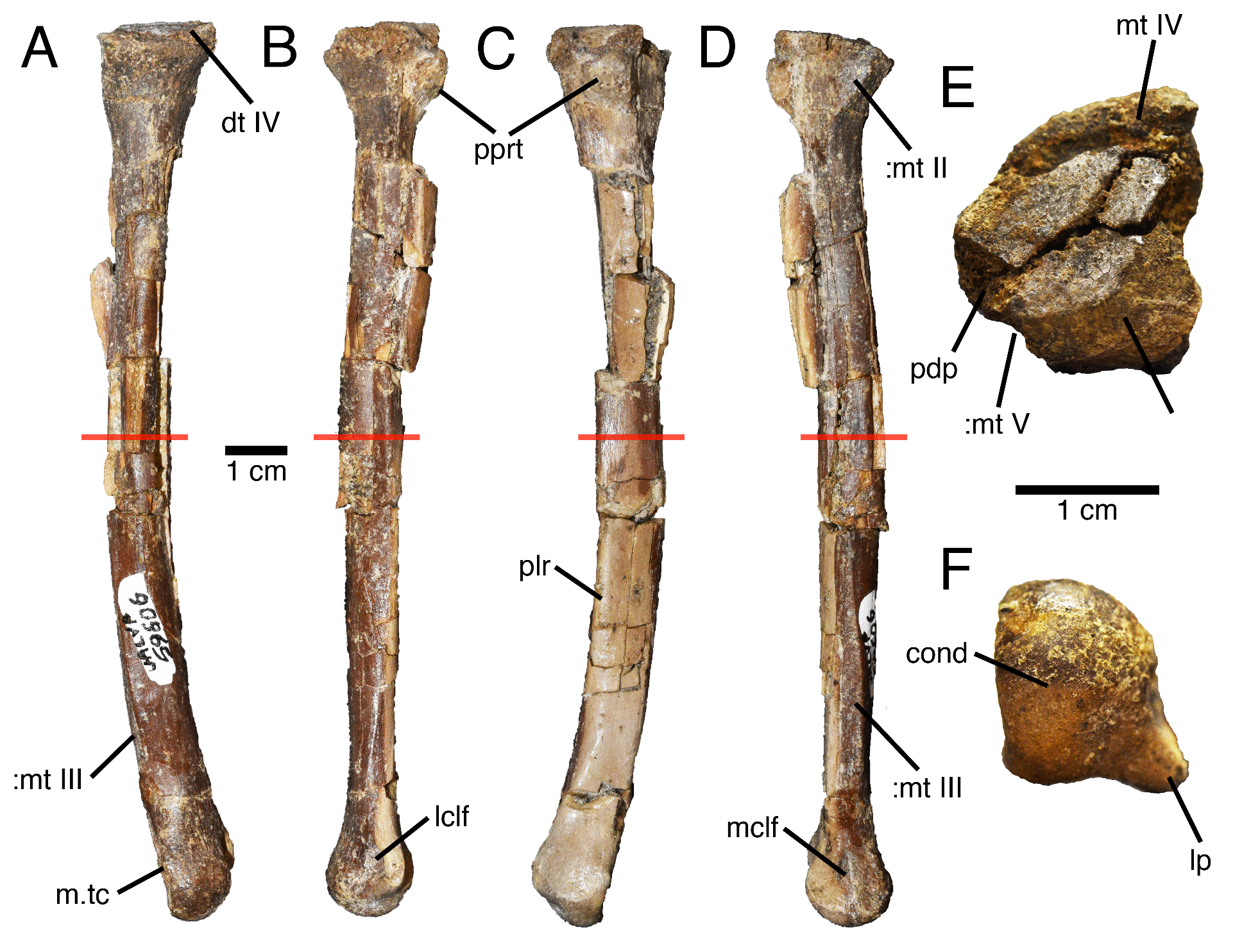
One of the metatarsals referred to Citipes, which was sectioned for histological analysis

New material assigned in 2020

During his comprehensive analysis in 2020, Gregory Funston referred two partial hip specimens to Citipes, however this assignment is somewhat uncertain because of the lack of overlapping material with the type series. Funston also argues that the designation of a paratype based solely on the size and locality of the specimen (in comparison to ROM 781) was unfounded, and he states that there is insufficient evidence to suggest that TMP 1992.36.290 belongs to the same taxon as ROM 781.

The first of the new specimens, TMP 1981.023.0039, is an anterior sacral vertebra which was found in association with two ilia (TMP 1981.023.0034-5). The shape of the centrum is characteristically low and wide, which is the condition seen in many other oviraptorosaurs. However, the anterior articular surface of the centrum is unbroken, which Funston suggests means that the sacrum was not fully fused when the animal died. Evidence of the sacral pleurocoels is also preserved on the lateral surface of the centrum. Despite the fact that these bones were not subject to a histological analysis, Funston believes they belong to an adult due to the large muscle attachment sites visible on the bone and the robustness of the iliac crest. The small size in an adult animal precludes the assignment of TMP 1981.023.0039 to either Caenagnathus or Chirostenotes, and therefore probably belongs to Citipes.

The remaining specimens, UALVP 59606, UALVP 55585, and UALVP 59606, consist of various partial tarsometatarsal bones of varying completeness and states of coossification. The latter of these was sectioned for histological analysis. Similarities with the known metatarsal elements of Elmisaurus were noted among these bones, which was reflected in the phylogenetic analysis that was conducted in the same paper.

Several other caenagnathid specimens from the collections of the Royal Tyrell Museum were described by Funston, but they were not referred to any particular genus within caenagnathidae. These remains, which included jaw bones, were small in size, but similar in morphology to Chirostenotes. Funston argues that they cannot be referred to a particular genus without being sectioned and having their ontogenetic age determined.

== Classification ==
=== Phylogeny ===
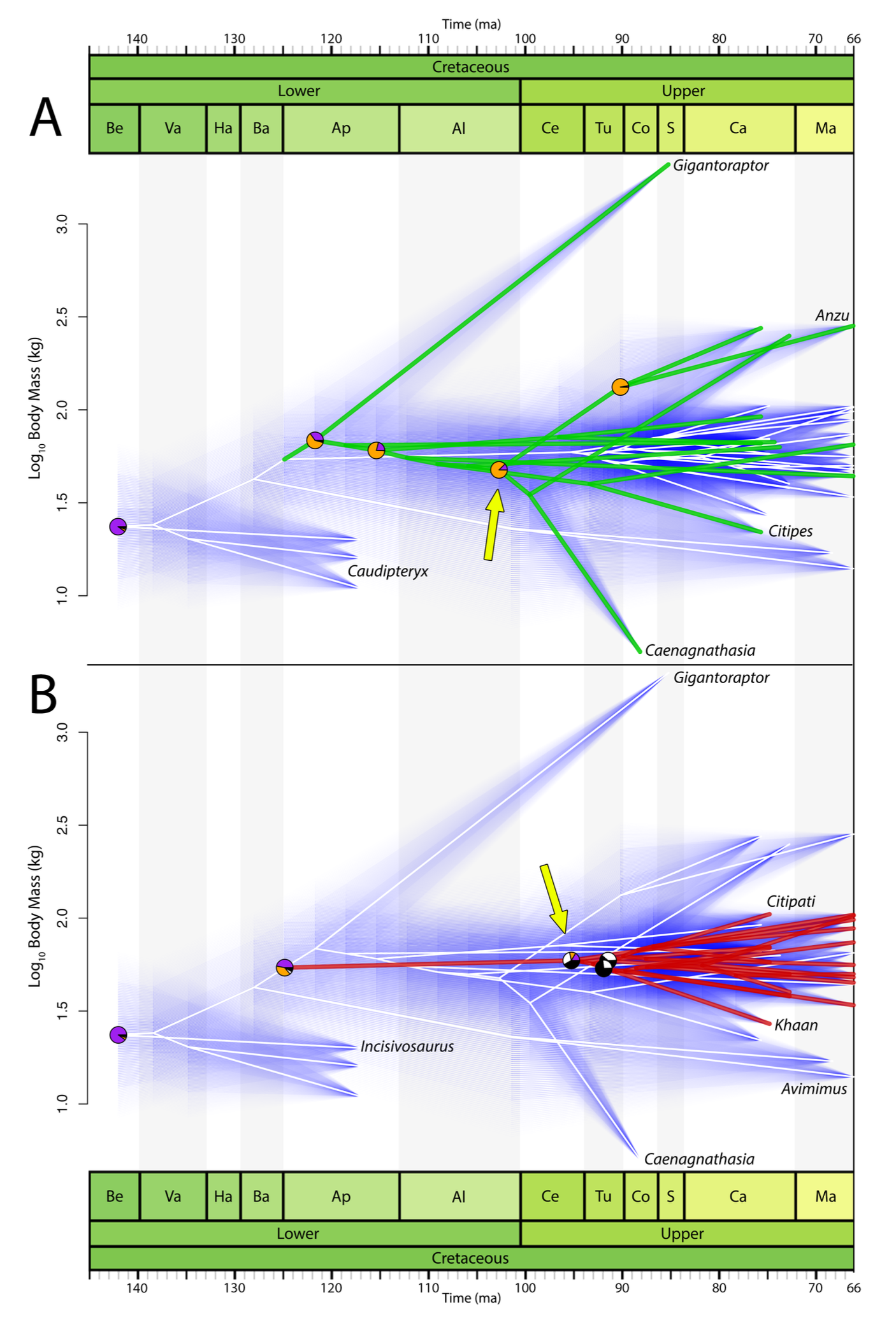
A phylogenetic analysis showing changes in body size in caenagnathids (top) and oviraptorids (bottom)

The first systematic phylogenetic analysis to include ROM 781 was the one conducted by Nicholas Longrich, Ken Barnes, Scott Clark, and Larry Millar in their paper describing the genus Leptorhynchos in 2013. In their analysis, they assign ROM 781 and several other specimens to a second species in the genus Leptorhynchos — L. elegans. Their analysis used the dataset of Longrich's earlier publication in 2010 with several new taxa added for a total of 28 taxa coded for 205 characters. Their data set also included recent information about Nemegtomaia and Nomingia which had been published since the analysis in 2010.

The monophyly of caenagnathidae was supported in their analysis based on the following diagnostic characters: fused dentaries, a ventrally bowed process on the underside of the dentary, the lack of contact between the dentary and the mandibular fenestra, and a shallow surangular bone. The analysis did resolve several taxa at the base of caenagnathidae including Gigantoraptor and Microvenator, but there was less resolution in the more derived area of the tree. In particular, their strict consensus tree did not support the unambiguous monophyly of the genus Leptorhynchos; the two species they assigned to the genus were in a polytomy with Hagryphus and a clade containing Caenagnathus, Chirostenotes, and the specimen BMNH 2033 (which was referred as an indeterminate species of Caenagnathus). The authors remark that they referred ROM 781 to Leptorhynchos because of the similar size of the two species, but noted that they may belong to separate genera, pending further research.

Longrich and colleagues broadly determined that most caenagnathid genera are diagnosed by characteristics of the mandible and manus, which allows researchers to diagnose genera and species based on very incomplete remains, but which also means that more complete remains are undiagnostic if they do not preserve the mandible or manus. However, the authors note that the shape of the beak in modern birds is an important diagnostic trait, as well as in some dinosaurs like Triceratops and Edmontosaurus, so they argue that it is not unreasonable to assume that this may be sufficient in naming new genera or species. Furthermore, the degree of fusion exhibited by the jaw bones, as well as their surface texture, can be indicative of ontogenetic age in many oviraptorosaurs, which can be used to determine if an individual specimen is a new taxon or simply a different life stage of an existing taxon.

For specimens which do not contain the relevant diagnostic characters or any indication of their ontogenetic age, they have been assigned to existing taxa according to size and locality. Longrich and colleagues note that this approach has shortcomings, but they argue that the ecological abundance of adult animals in any ecosystem means that most fossilized animals will be adults anyways, which they suggest is sufficient for the purposes of their analysis. A consensus of the 116 most parsimonious trees in their analysis is shown below.

- Oviraptorosauria
  - Incisivosaurus
  - - Caudipteridae
    - - Avimimidae
      - Caenagnathoidea
        - Oviraptoridae
        - Caenagnathidae
          - Microvenator
          - - Gigantoraptor
            - - Caenagnathasia
              - Elmisaurus
              - Caenagnathinae
                - Leptorhynchos elegans (later Citipes)
                - Leptorhynchos gaddisi
                - Hagryphus
                - - Chirostenotes
                  - - Caenagnathus collinsi
                    - Caenagnathus sp. (BMNH 2033 from Hell Creek)

In his review of caenagnathids from the Dinosaur Park Formation, Funston conducted a phylogenetic analysis of oviraptorosauria. This analysis used the same data set which he developed for the description of the new genus Oksoko, and it included all described oviraptorosaur taxa known from that time as well as a few unnamed taxa.

This analysis recovered similar results to most prior analyses. Namely, that elmisaurinae was not a natural monophyletic clade; Funston found several traditionally "elmisaurine" genera, such as Chirostenotes and Apatoraptor to be more widely distributed throughout the trees in his analysis, rather than grouping together as a single radiation of Laramidian caenagnathids. He also recovered Caenagnathasia, which is one of the oldest unambiguous caenagnathids, in a relatively derived position as the sister genus of the Laramidian Epichirostenotes. The controversial Asian genera Nomingia and Anomalipes were also recovered as caenagnathids in his analysis, suggesting that the group persisted in Asia even after the diversification of oviraptoridae. However, Fuston is careful to note that the topology of his tree is not strongly supported and is likely to be revised by future analyses.

- Caenagnathidae
  - Microvenator
  - - Gigantoraptor
    - - Anomalipes
      - Caenagnathinae
        - - Chirostenotes
          - Hagryphus
        - - Nomingia
          - - "Elmisaurines"
              - Citipes
              - Elmisaurus
            - - Apatoraptor
              - - - Caenagnathasia
                  - Epichirostenotes
                - - Anzu
                  - Caenagnathus

=== Possible synonymity ===
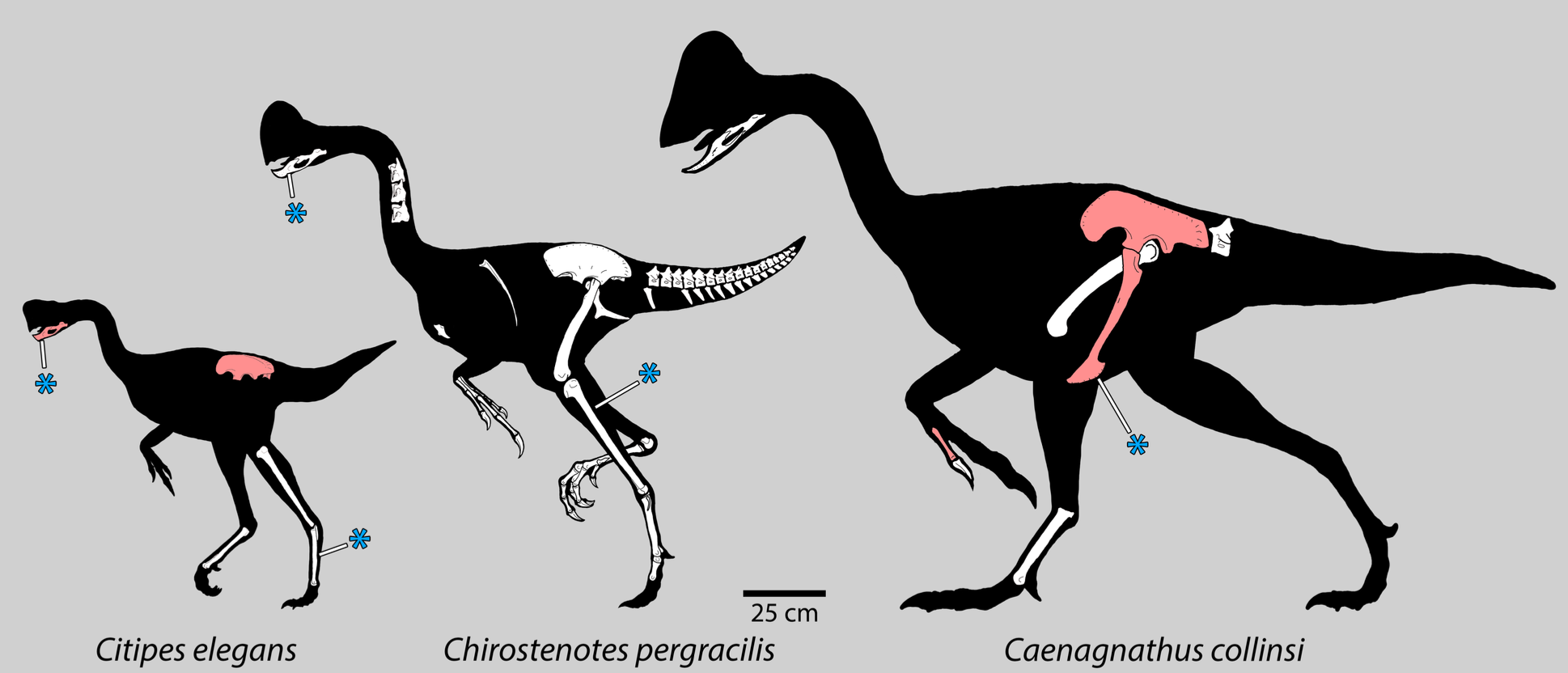
Known caenagnathid remains from the Dinosaur Park Formation shown to scale with each other

In a study of the pelvic morphology of all caenagnathid material from the Dinosaur Park Formation in 2019, Matthew Rhodes and colleagues categorize every specimen into one of three categories. The morph which they believe belongs to a new taxon, later named Citipes, is described as the "small, robust morphotype" and is distinct from all other caenagnathid pelves in the formation. The most immediately visible distinction is that the pelves of the small, robust morph are curved into a slight letter-s shape when viewed from above or below. Other differences are present but less obvious such as the very small pubic peduncle and the expanded dorsal ridge on the posterior part of the ilium.

Rhodes and colleagues suggested that these morphological distinctions in the hip bones of caenagnathids were unlikely to be the result of ontogeny because the level of coossification between the ilia and sacra is similar in very differently sized specimens. Funston elaborated on this finding in 2020 in his description of Citipes. The similar ontogenetic age of differently sized postcranial remains indicated the probable presence of three caenagnathid taxa in Dinosaur Park. Two of these taxa had already been named, and the remaining group of specimens — comprising the small, robust morph — were morphologically distinct from the Texan species of Leptorhynchos which they had been named as in 2013. Phylogenetic analyses have never found the two "species" of Leptorhynchos as sister taxa, but there have not been any comprehensive reviews of Funston's phylogenetic analysis to date, nor have any new analyses been conducted as of yet.

== Paleobiology ==
=== Growth and histology ===
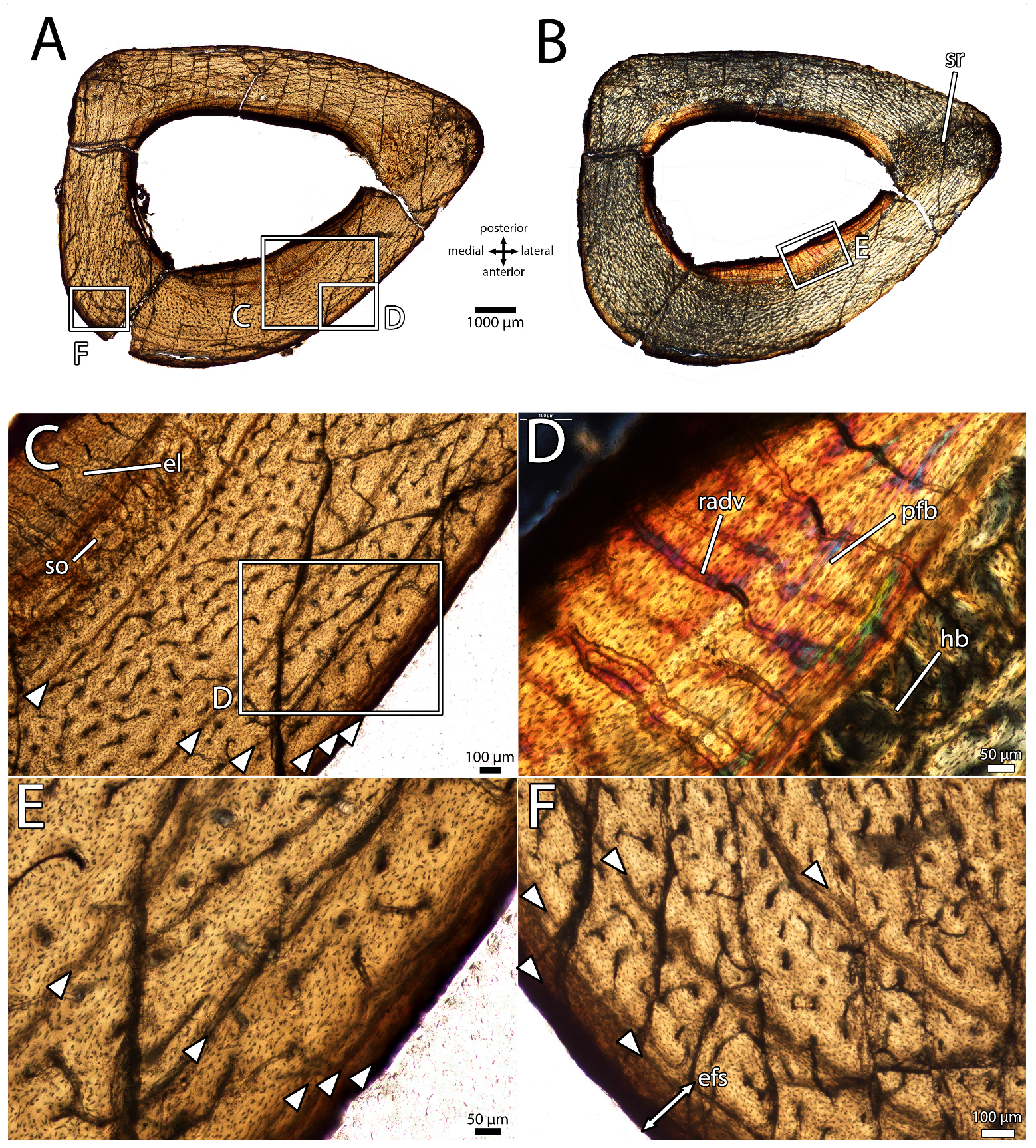
Histological section of one of the metatarsals referred to Citipes

The ontogeny of caenagnathids is difficult to study due to the incompleteness of known remains. This is further complicated by the relative lack of overlapping skeletal material from the various named taxa of the Dinosaur Park Formation. Gregory Funston and colleagues conducted a histological study of caenagnathid dentaries (the most common remains found in Dinosaur Park) and noticed that the mandibular symphysis becomes fully ossified relatively early in caeagnathid growth, and it is thus a poor indicator of the precise age of a specimen. Another impediment to precise age identification are the possible irregularities in the deposition of bone tissues as the animals grow. Funston and colleagues notice that the lines of arrested growth (or LAGs), which usually correspond to slower growth during the winter months, may not have been formed in caenagnathids under 1–2 years of age, which may lead to the underestimation of the ages of some specimens.

=== Pathology ===
One of the specimens referred to Citipes (at the time, Leptorhynchos elegans) is TMP 1992.036.0476, which is a mostly complete ilium that was fractured at some point during the animal's life. The fracture extends along the surface between the pubic and ischiatic peduncles, and has resulted in a significant swelling of the ilium, which can be clearly seen from above and slightly obscures the brevis fossa. Taphonomic breakage of the fossil has also revealed trabecular bone in the specimen, which suggests that the animal survived for at least a short time after it received the injury that caused this fracture.

== Paleoecology ==
=== Diet and niche partitioning ===
The Dinosaur Park Formation can be divided into several discrete faunal assemblages which were not all contemporaneous. However, it is presently unclear if any of the known caenagnathid genera are restricted to one or more of these faunal zones. Caenagnathid remains have not been recovered as often as those of other coelurosaurs, but this is partially accounted for by their relatively small size and lack of teeth, which may present a sampling bias.

While caenagnathid remains are relatively uncommon, they are widely dispersed across Dinosaur Provincial Park, with no clear pattern of which genera are found at specific localities. This suggests that they were present throughout the faunal zones of the Dinosaur Park Formation, which implies there was some sort of niche differentiation between the three taxa. The most immediately obvious morphological difference between Caenagnathus, Chirostenotes, and Citipes is the variation in their adult size. This is the primary means to distinguish remains of the three genera, but there are also several more subtle morphological distinctions. Citipes is believed to have been more adapted for cursoriality due to the coossification of its metatarsals and expanded attachment sites for leg muscles along the iliac crest. It is not certain what the ecological implications of these adaptations may have been, but they appear to be unique in that regard among the caenagnathids of the Dinosaur Park Formation.

Caenagnathus is substantially larger than either Citipes or Chirostenotes, and it is believed to be primarily herbivorous because the better-understood and closely related taxon Anzu is believed to have been a herbivore. Chirostenotes, on the other hand, has a sharply upturned tip of the lower jaw, which is possibly an adaptation for a more carnivorous mode of life, although this remains speculative and untestable due to the incompleteness of these remains.

=== Predation ===
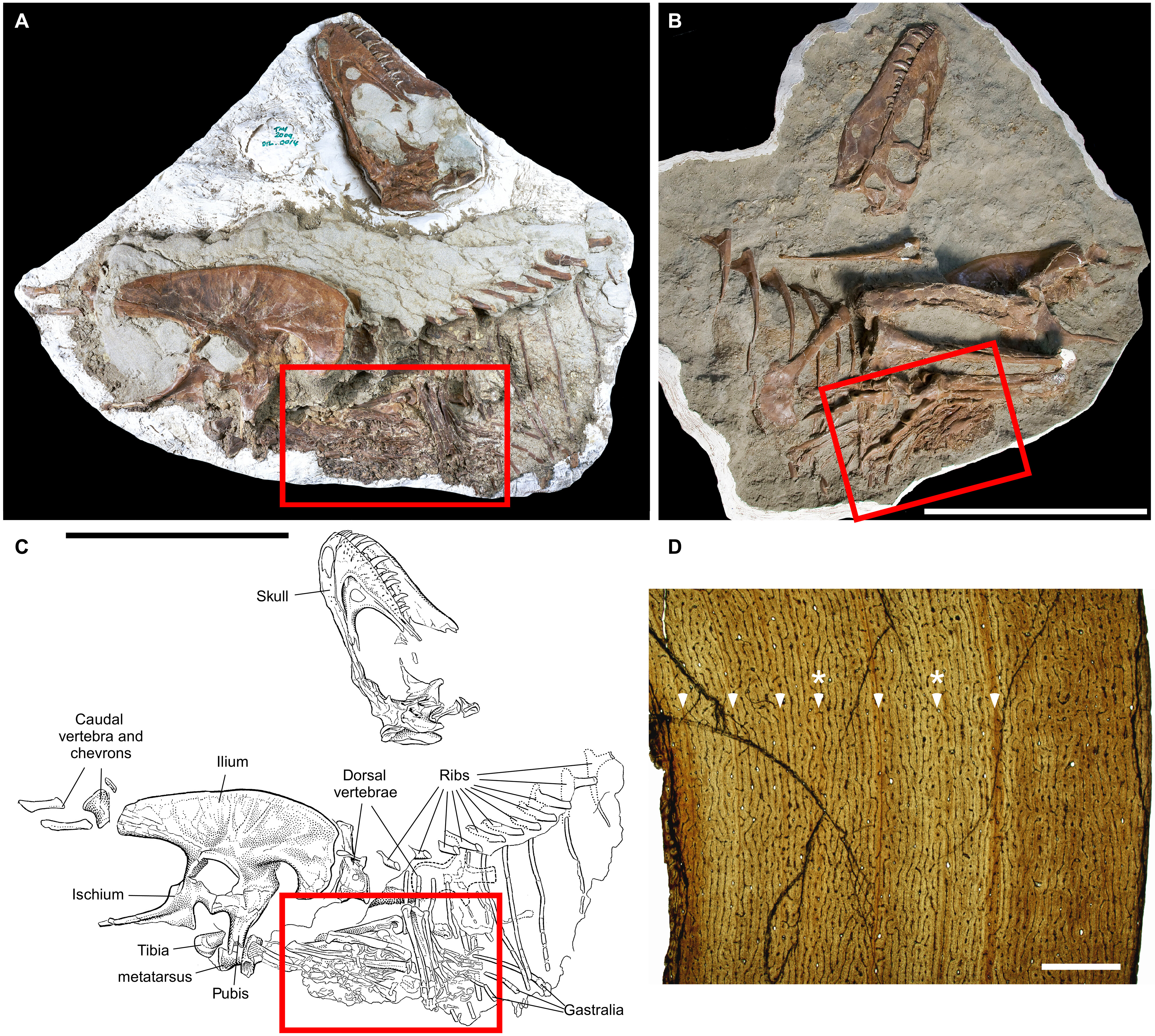
A juvenile Gorgosaurus with Citipes remains preserved in its stomach

In 2023, François Therrien and colleagues described TMP 2009.12.14 — an exceptionally preserved juvenile specimen of Gorgosaurus, which contained remains from at least two Citipes individuals. The legs of the Citipes individuals were flexed and contorted into a very compact shape, which suggests that they were inside the stomach of the Gorgosaurus, rather than being preserved alongside it or washed together post-mortem. This demonstrated that Gorgosaurus occasionally fed upon Citipes.

The femur of the Gorgosaurus was sectioned and subjected to histological analysis, which revealed that it was between 5–7 years-old when it died and was only about one-eighth the mass of an adult Gorgosaurus. Histology of the Citipes bones showed a complete lack of growth marks, leading Therrien and colleagues to suggest that these individuals were within their first year of life when they were eaten by the Gorgosaurus.

Notably, the Citipes individuals do not appear to have been eaten in their entirety. Only the hind limbs and elements of the caudal vertebrae are preserved within the stomach cavity of the Gorgosaurus. This is unlikely to be due to digestion because the two specimens are known to have been consumed at different times due to their relative locations within the presumed digestive tract of the predator and the Gorgosaurus must have died prior to fully digesting the Citipes or they would not have been preserved. This, taken together, suggests that the predator may have had a preference for eating the hind limbs of Citipes, which are hypothesized to have been more muscular and thus more nutritious.

In their description of TMP 2009.12.14, Therrien and colleagues conducted a regression analysis of the relationship between the masses of extant reptilian and mammalian predators and the masses of potential sympatric prey items. They used this, along with the estimated masses of juvenile and adult Gorgosaurus to predict the possible range of prey sizes for young and adult individuals of that genus. Their findings indicated that Gorgosaurus individuals of both major ontogenetic ranges, juvenile and adult, were within the size range that both juvenile and adult Citipes could be considered prey items.

=== Paleoenvironment ===
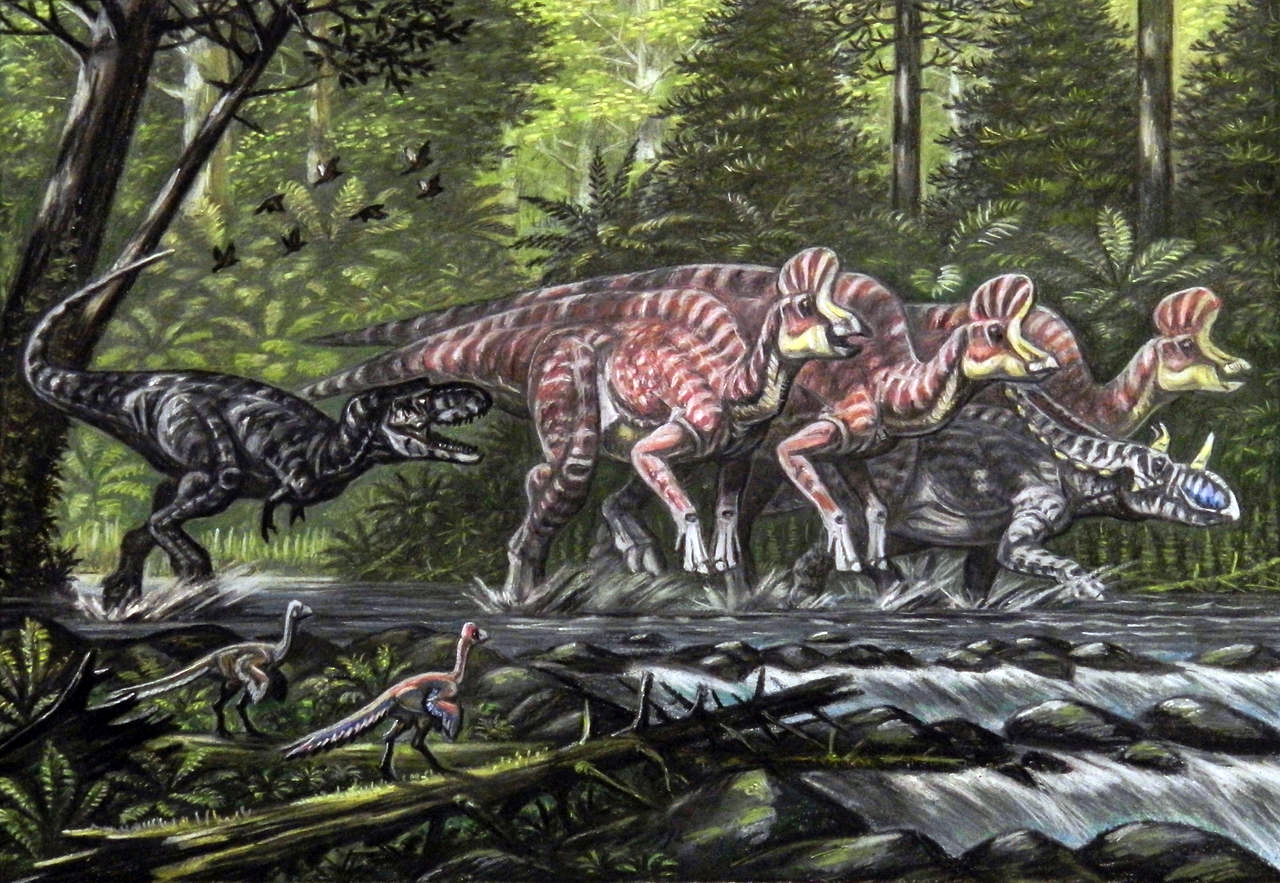
A life reconstruction of several dinosaurs in the fluvial environment that the Dinosaur Park Formation contained

Citipes was discovered at the Little Sand Hill Creek locality, which is located within Dinosaur Provincial Park in Alberta, Canada. The age of this locality relative to the rest of the Dinosaur Park Formation is not known confidently known. However, the Dinosaur Park Formation as a whole is relatively confidently known to have been deposited between 77.03 and 75.46 million years ago.

The Dinosaur Park Formation is composed of sediments that were derived from the erosion of the mountains to the west. It was deposited on an alluvial to coastal plain by river systems that flowed eastward and southeastward to the Bearpaw Sea, a large inland sea that was part of the Western Interior Seaway. That sea gradually inundated the adjacent coastal plain, depositing the marine shales of the Bearpaw Formation on top of the Dinosaur Park Formation.

The Dinosaur Park Formation is roughly 75 metres (250 ft) thick. The lower portion of the formation was laid down in fluvial channel environments and consists primarily of fine- to medium-grained, crossbedded sandstones. The upper portion, which was deposited in overbank and floodplain environments, consists primarily of massive to laminated, organic-rich mudstones with abundant root traces, and thin beds of bentonite. The Lethbridge Coal Zone, which consists of several seams of low-rank coal interbedded with mudstones and siltstones, marks the top of the formation.

These geological features are interpreted as a low-relief setting of rivers and floodplains that became more swampy and influenced by marine conditions over time as the Western Interior Seaway transgressed westward. The climate was warmer than present-day Alberta, without frost, but with wetter and drier seasons. Conifers were apparently the dominant canopy plants, with an understory of ferns, tree ferns, and angiosperms.

=== Contemporary fauna ===
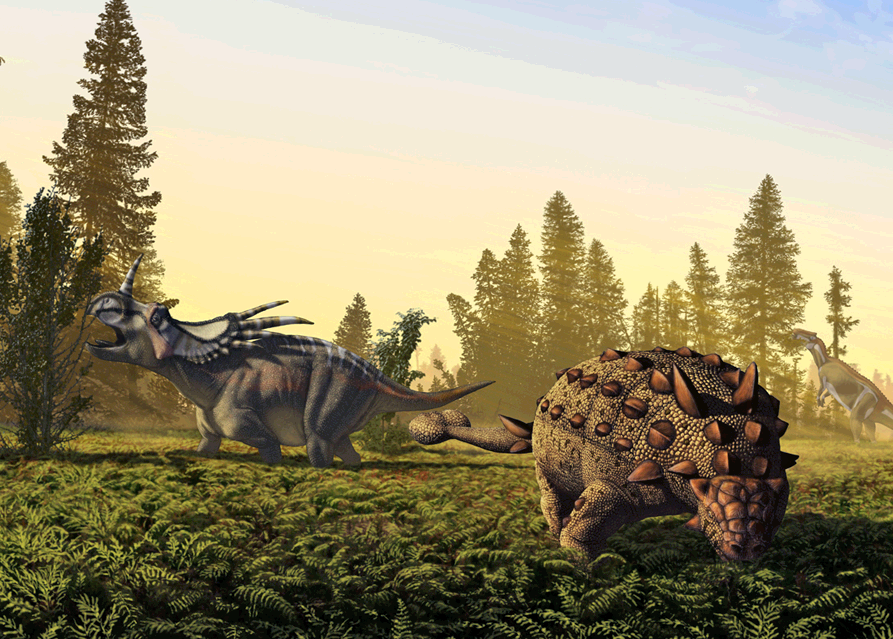
An artistic rendition of a Scolosaurus (right) and a Styracosaurus (left) in their natural environment with other dinosaurs visible in the background

The Dinosaur Park Formation preserves one of the most diverse non-avian dinosaur assemblages known in the fossil record. At least six species of hadrosaurids including the well-known Parasaurolophus and Corythosaurus, are known from various layers in addition to eight or more species of ceratopsids in such well-known genera as Styracosaurus, Chasmosaurus, and Centrosaurus. Ankylosaurs are also abundant, being represented by both nodosaurids, such as Edmontonia, and ankylosaurids, such as Euoplocephalus.

Preying on this wide variety of large ornithischians were the tyrannosaurids Gorgosaurus and Daspletosaurus, which coexisted in the Dinosaur Park Formation as well as the Judith River and Two Medicine formations. Gorgosaurus is also known to have preyed on Citipes directly in addition to larger dinosaurs. These large tyrannosaurids were accompanied by an array of smaller theropods including ornithomimosaurs, troodontids, and dromaeosaurs, in addition to the above mentioned caenagnathids. These smaller-bodied theropods are known from substantially less complete remains with some taxa, such as Paronychodon, being known only from teeth. More well-known small theropods included Dromaeosaurus, Latenivenatrix, and Saurornitholestes.

The waterways of the Dinosaur Park Formation also played host to several plesiosaur taxa, although only one, Fluvionectes, has been named. Among the other aquatic reptiles present were the choristodere Champsosaurus and the crocodilians Albertochampsa and Leidyosuchus. The recently described azhdarchid Cryodrakon has also been preserved alongside some indeterminate pterosaur remains.

The Dinosaur Park Formation also preserves a wide array of smaller animals which would have been abundant in the waterways of the depositional environment. These included a variety turtles such as the large nanhsiungchelyid Basilemys and the widespread genus Adocus. There were also abundant lizards at Dinosaur Park, with taxa from the families Helodermatidae, Varanidae, Teiidae, and Xenosauridae being known. Mammals were also abundant in the area with representatives from all three major Late Cretaceous mammal groups — the eutherians, metatherians, and multituberculates — being known from several genera each. The freshwater systems of the region would have also supported a great variety of fish species including carpet sharks, stingrays, gar, sturgeons, and paddlefish.

== See also ==
- 2020 in archosaur paleontology
- 2023 in archosaur paleontology
- Cretaceous land vertebrate ages in North America (Judithian)
- Judith River Formation and Two Medicine Formation - roughly coeval geological formations in Alberta and Montana
- List of North American dinosaurs
- List of stratigraphic units with dinosaur body fossils
- Timeline of oviraptorosaur research
