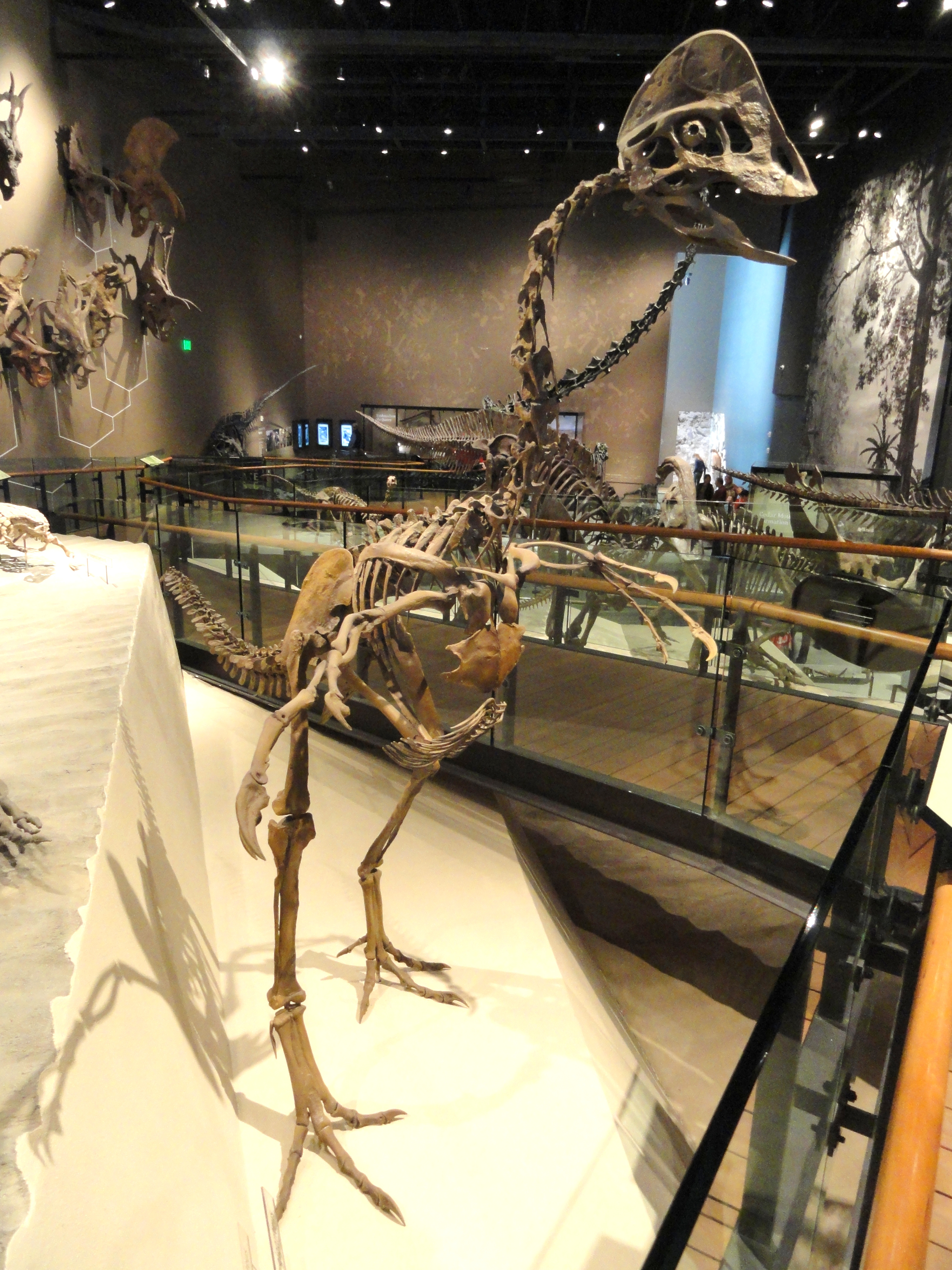
- Reconstructed skeleton based on the related Anzu, Natural History Museum of Utah

Scientific classification
- Kingdom: Animalia
- Phylum: Chordata
- Class: Reptilia
- Clade: Dinosauria
- Clade: Saurischia
- Clade: Theropoda
- Family: †Caenagnathidae
- Genus: †Hagryphus; Zanno & Sampson, 2005

Type species
- †Hagryphus giganteus Zanno & Sampson, 2005

= Hagryphus =

Hagryphus Temporal range: Late Cretaceous, 75.95 Ma

Extinct genus of dinosaurs

Hagryphus (meaning "Ha's griffin") is a monospecific genus of caenagnathid dinosaur from southern Utah that lived during the Late Cretaceous (upper Campanian stage, 75.95 Ma) in what is now the Kaiparowits Formation of the Grand Staircase–Escalante National Monument. The type and only species, Hagryphus giganteus, is known only from an incomplete but articulated left manus and the distal portion of the left radius. It was named in 2005 by Lindsay E. Zanno and Scott D. Sampson. Hagryphus has an estimated length of 2.4–3 metres (8–10 feet) and weight of 50 kilograms (110 lbs).

== Discovery ==
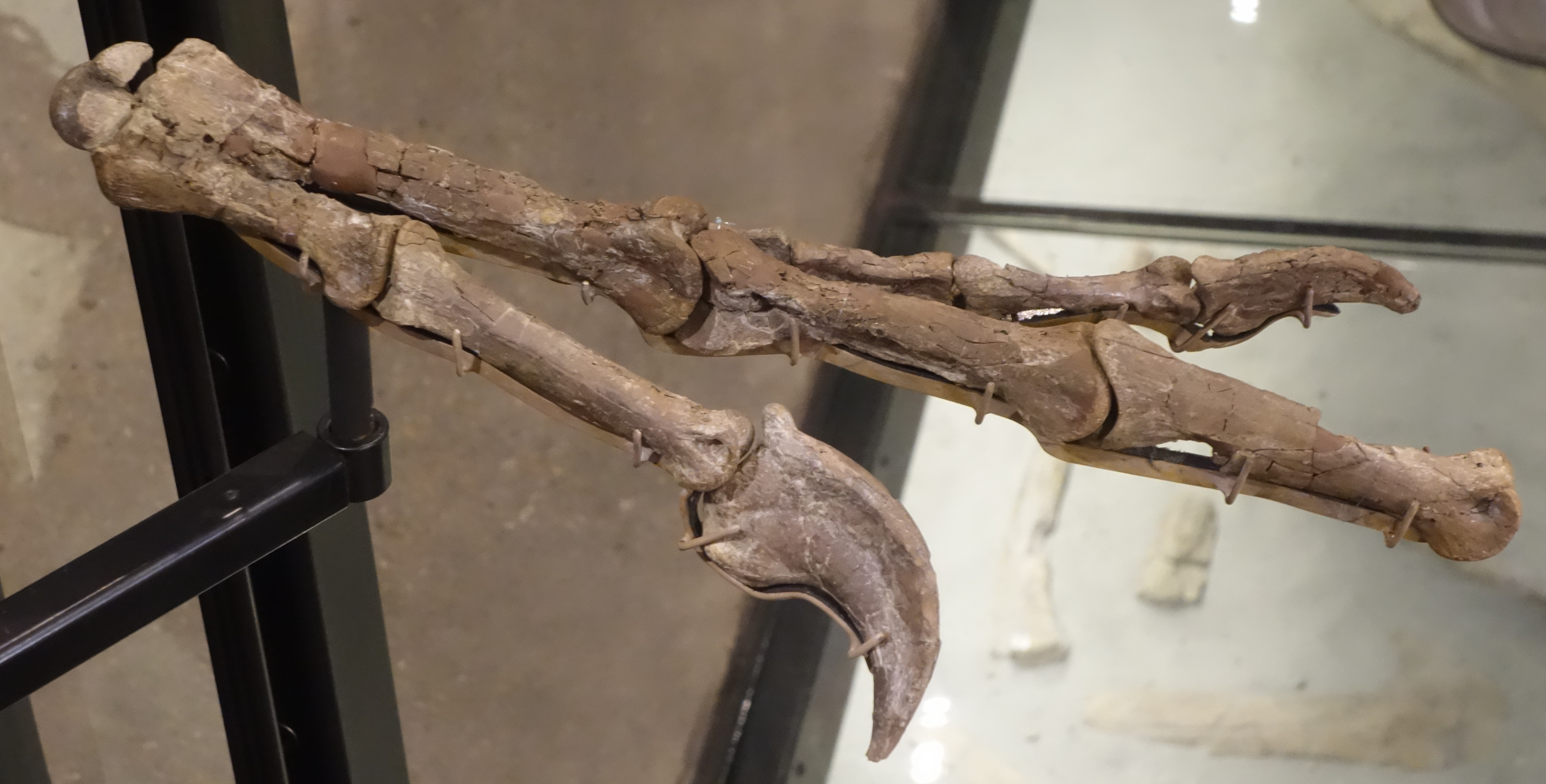
Holotype specimen on display at Natural History Museum of Utah, Salt Lake City.

To date, only a single species of Hagryphus has been named, in 2005 by Lindsay Zanno and Scott Sampson, the type species Hagryphus giganteus. The generic name is derived from Egyptian Ha, the name of the god of the western desert and a Latinised Greek γρύψ (gryps) meaning 'griffin' (a mythological bird-like creature). The specific name means "gigantic" in Latin.

The holotype was discovered in 2002 by Michael Getty in the Kaiparowits Formation (Late Campanian) in the Grand Staircase–Escalante National Monument of southern Utah. The find was scientifically reported in 2003. Radiometric dating of rocks from slightly below the rock bed where the fossil was found indicates that the specimen died 75.95 million years ago. Designated UMNH VP 12765, the type specimen resides in the collections of the Utah Museum of Natural History in Salt Lake City. It consists of an incomplete but articulated left manus and the distal portion of the left radius. The hand lacks the second claw. In the wrist both the semilunate carpal bone and the radiale are preserved. Also some fragmentary foot elements, found at the hillside near the hand, have been catalogued under the same inventory number.

== Description ==
Size comparison of Hagryphus

As the specific name indicates, Hagryphus giganteus was a particularly large oviraptorosaur, estimated by the describers to have been approximately three meters (10 ft) long, which makes it one of the largest members of the clade Oviraptorosauria (Barsbold, 1976), apart from the later described Gigantoraptor. H. giganteus was estimated to have been 30-40% larger than the next largest known North American oviraptorosaur, Chirostenotes. The hand of the holotype was about a foot long. However, later estimates have been lower: Gregory S. Paul in 2010 gave a length of eight feet and a weight of fifty kilogrammes.

== Classification ==
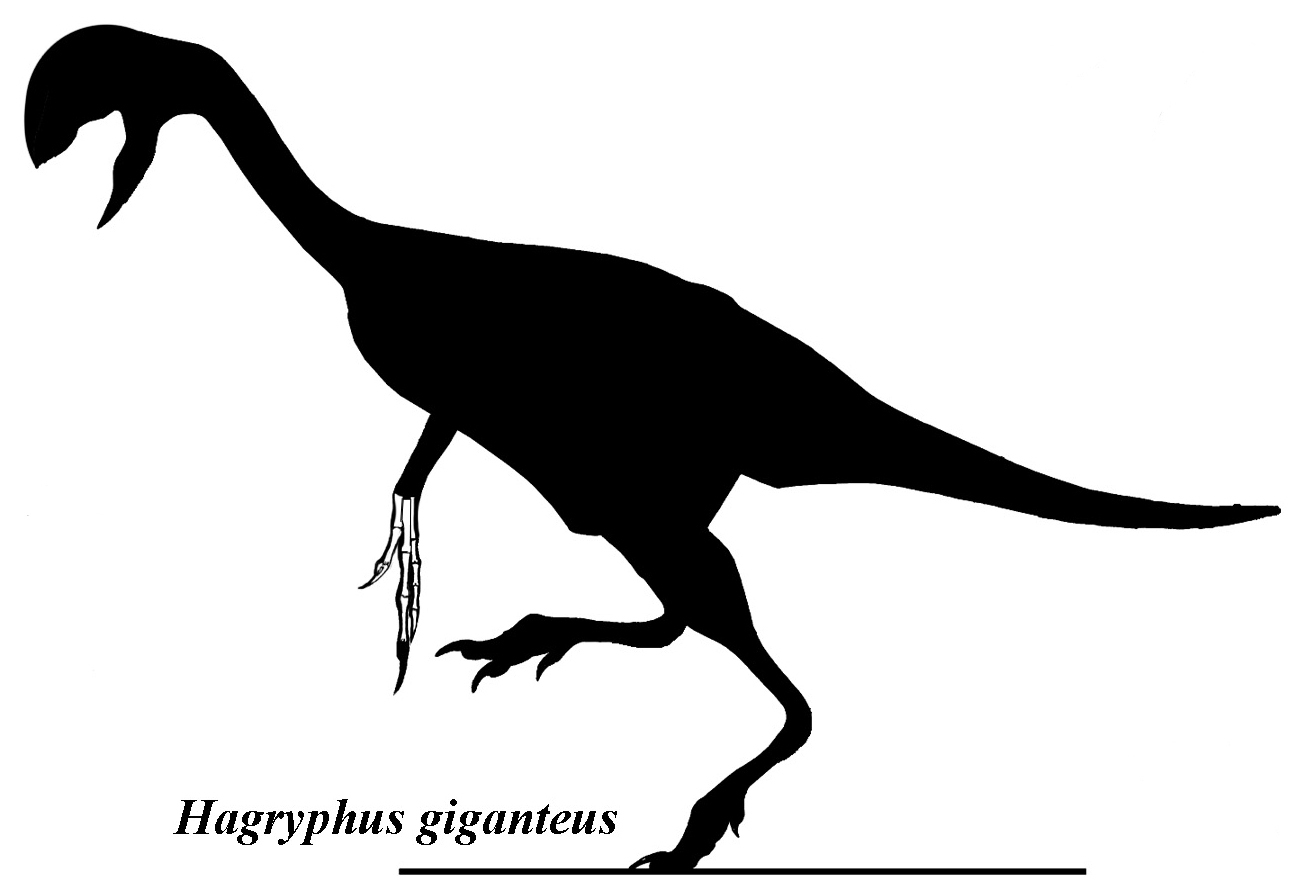
Silhouette showing the known hand

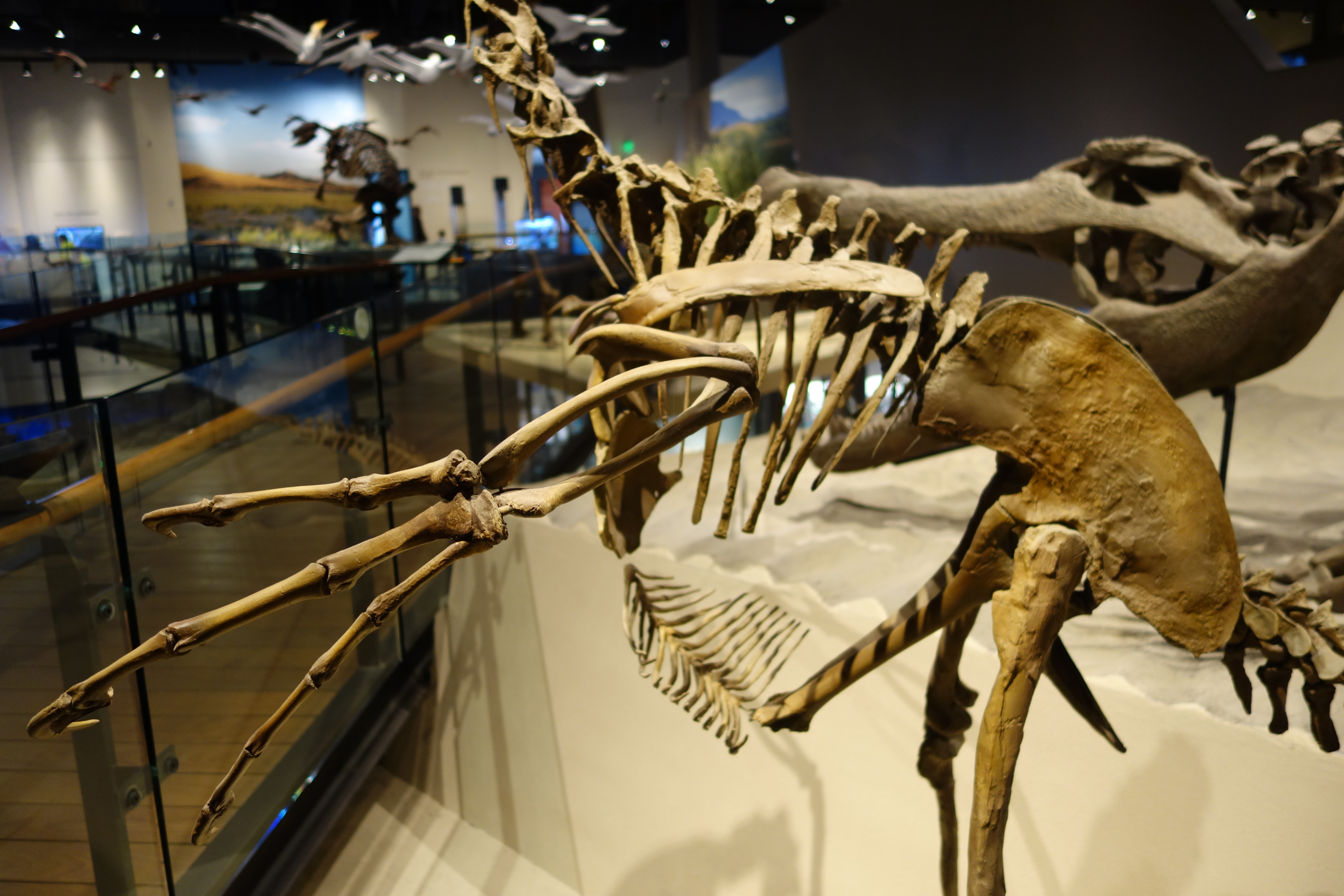
Left hand of the reconstructed skeleton

In 2003 Zanno & Sampson reported the new find as a member of the Caenagnathidae. However, in 2005 they limited the precision of the determination to a more general Oviraptorosauria. Hagryphus would then be the southernmost known oviraptorosaurian from the Americas.

Other known species of North American oviraptorosaurs include Anzu wyliei, Microvenator celer, and Chirostenotes pergracilis. This group of dinosaurs is better known from the Cretaceous of Asia, where forms such as Khaan mckennai, Conchoraptor gracilis and Oviraptor philoceratops have been discovered.

Oviraptorosaurs are characterized by a shortened snout, massive edentulous jaws and extensively pneumatized skulls, often sporting elaborate crests, the function of which remains unknown. The toothless jaws have indicated to some a diet of eggs but these theropods more likely fed on plants or small vertebrates. Evidence suggests that they were feathered and some paleontologists consider them to be true birds (see the main article Oviraptorosauria for further information).

A phylogenetic analysis conducted by Funston (2020) is reproduced below.

- Caenagnathidae
  - Microvenator celer
  - - Gigantoraptor erlianensis
    - - Anomalipes zhaoi
      - - - Chirostenotes pergracilis
          - Hagryphus giganteus
        - - Nomingia gobiensis
          - - Elmisaurinae
              - Citipes elegans
              - Elmisaurus rarus
            - Caenagnathinae
              - Apatoraptor pennatus
              - - - Caenagnathasia martinsoni
                  - Epichirostenotes curriei
                - - Anzu wyliei
                  - Caenagnathus collinsi

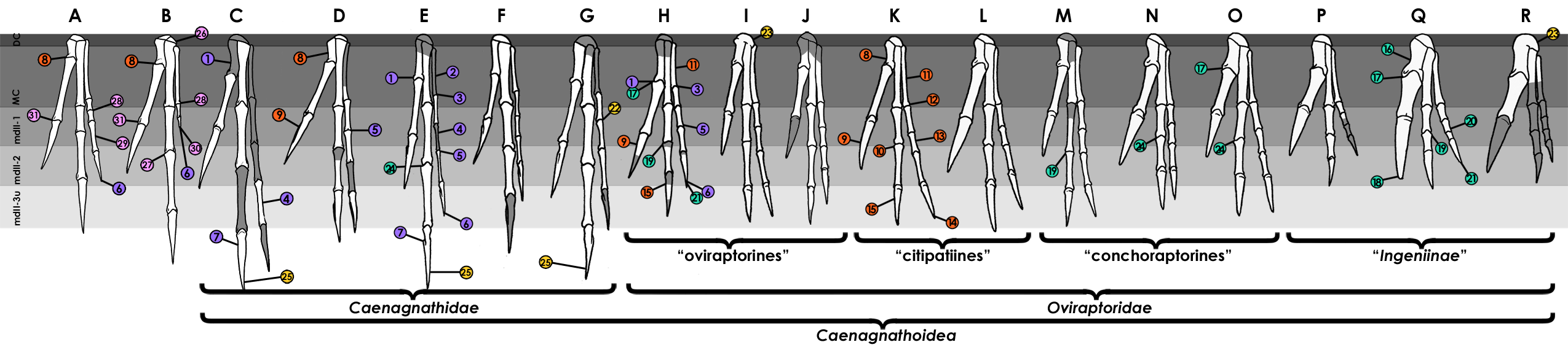
Hand (F) of compared to those of other oviraptorosaurs

The results of an earlier analysis by Funston & Currie (2016) are reproduced below.

- Caenagnathidae
  - Microvenator celer
  - unnamed
    - Gigantoraptor erlianensis
    - unnamed
      - Hagryphus giganteus
      - - - Epichirostenotes curriei
          - Anzu wyliei
        - - Caenagnathus collinsi
          - Elmisaurinae
            - Caenagnathasia martinsoni
            - - Chirostenotes pergracilis
              - - Leptorhynchos elegans
                - - Apatoraptor pennatus
                  - Elmisaurus rarus

== Paleoenvironment ==
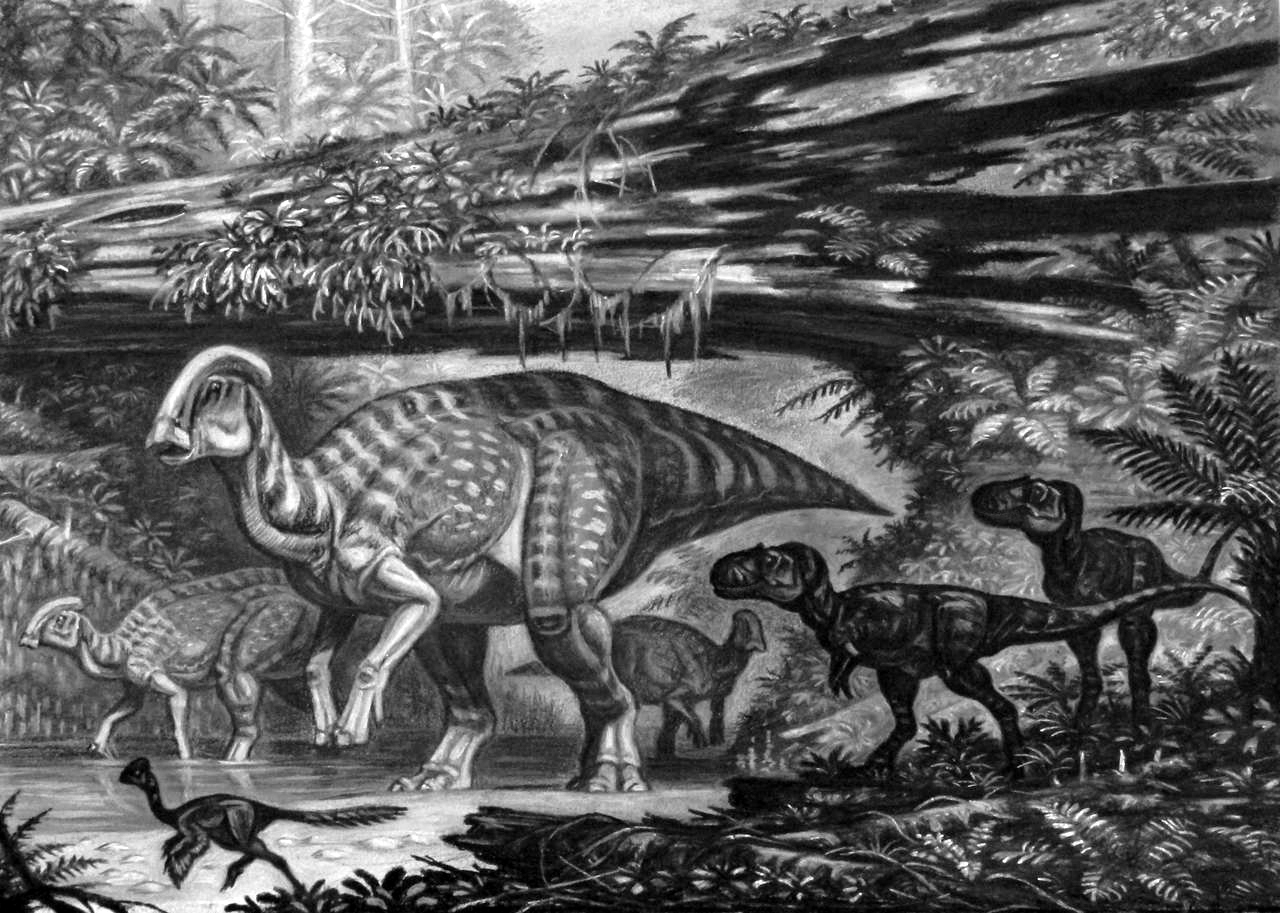
Hagryphus (left foreground) and other dinosaurs of the Kaiparowits Formation

The only known specimen of Hagryphus was recovered at the Kaiparowits Formation, in southern Utah. Argon-argon radiometric dating indicates that the Kaiparowits Formation was deposited between 76.1 and 74.0 million years ago, during the Campanian stage of the Late Cretaceous period. During the Late Cretaceous period, the site of the Kaiparowits Formation was located near the western shore of the Western Interior Seaway, a large inland sea that split North America into two landmasses, Laramidia to the west and Appalachia to the east. The plateau where dinosaurs lived was an ancient floodplain dominated by large channels and abundant wetland peat swamps, ponds and lakes, and was bordered by highlands. The climate was wet and humid, and supported an abundant and diverse range of organisms. This formation contains one of the best and most continuous records of Late Cretaceous terrestrial life in the world.

Hagryphus shared its paleoenvironment with theropods such as dromaeosaurids, the troodontid Talos sampsoni, ornithomimids like Ornithomimus velox, tyrannosaurids like Albertosaurus and Teratophoneus, armored ankylosaurids, the duckbilled hadrosaurs Parasaurolophus cyrtocristatus and Gryposaurus monumentensis, and the ceratopsians Utahceratops gettyi, Nasutoceratops titusi and Kosmoceratops richardsoni. Paleofauna present in the Kaiparowits Formation included chondrichthyans (sharks and rays), frogs, salamanders, turtles, lizards and crocodilians. A variety of early mammals were present including multituberculates, metatherians, and eutherians.

== See also ==
- Timeline of oviraptorosaur research
