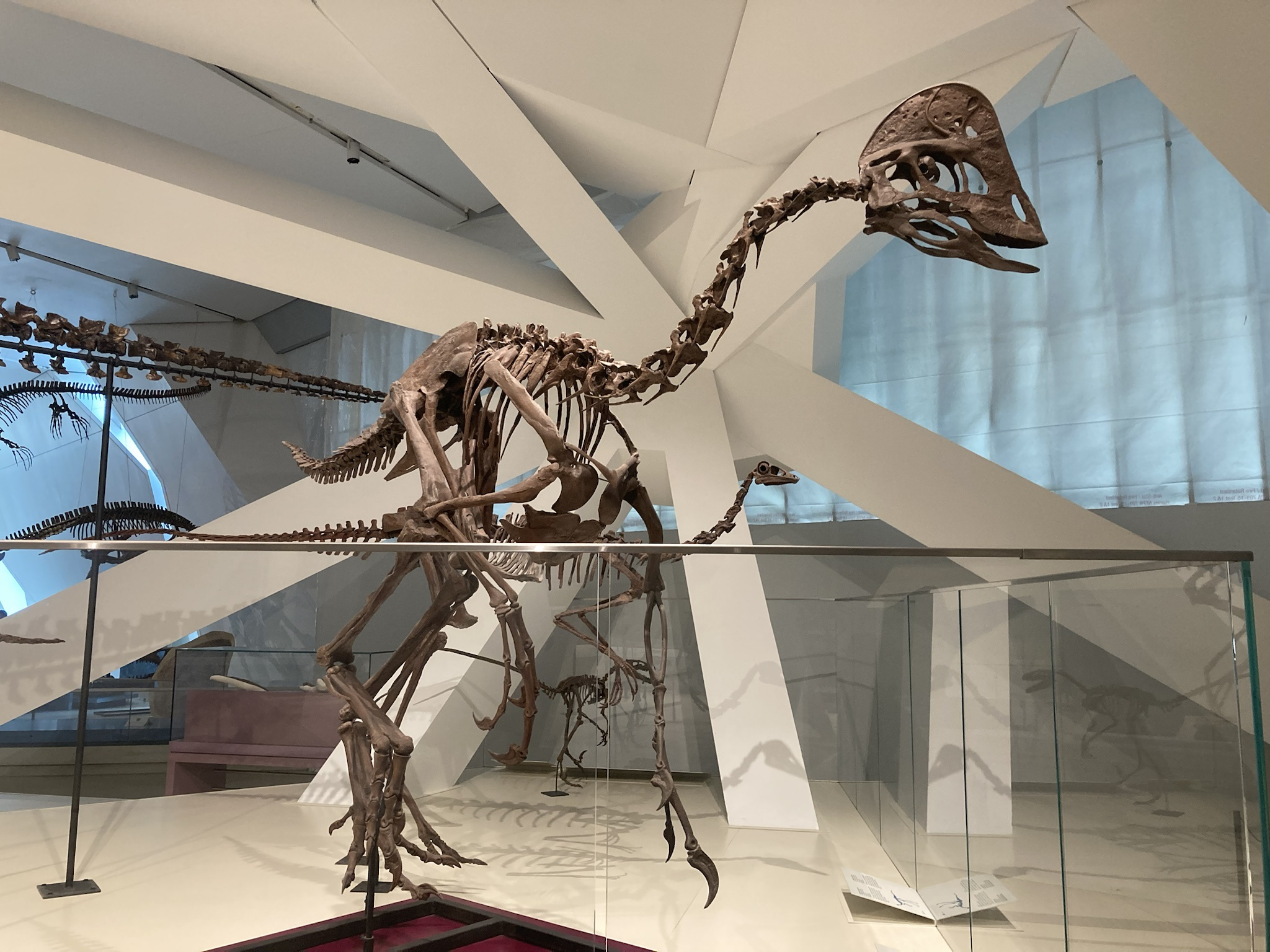
- Reconstructed skeleton, Royal Ontario Museum

Scientific classification
- Kingdom: Animalia
- Phylum: Chordata
- Class: Reptilia
- Clade: Dinosauria
- Clade: Saurischia
- Clade: Theropoda
- Family: †Caenagnathidae
- Subfamily: †Caenagnathinae
- Genus: †Anzu; Lamanna et al., 2014

Type species
- †Anzu wyliei Lamanna et al., 2014

= Anzu wyliei =

Anzu Temporal range: Late Cretaceous (Maastrichtian), 67.2–66 Ma

Genus of caenagnathid dinosaur

Anzu (named for Anzû, a bird-like daemon in Ancient Mesopotamian religion) is a genus of caenagnathid dinosaur that lived in the United States during the Late Cretaceous (upper Maastrichtian stage). The type species, Anzu wyliei, known from numerous skeletons that preserve cranial and postcranial elements discovered from the Hell Creek and Lance Formation. It was named in 2014 by Matthew C. Lamanna, Hans-Dieter Sues, Emma R. Schachner, and Tyler R. Lyson.

== History of discovery ==
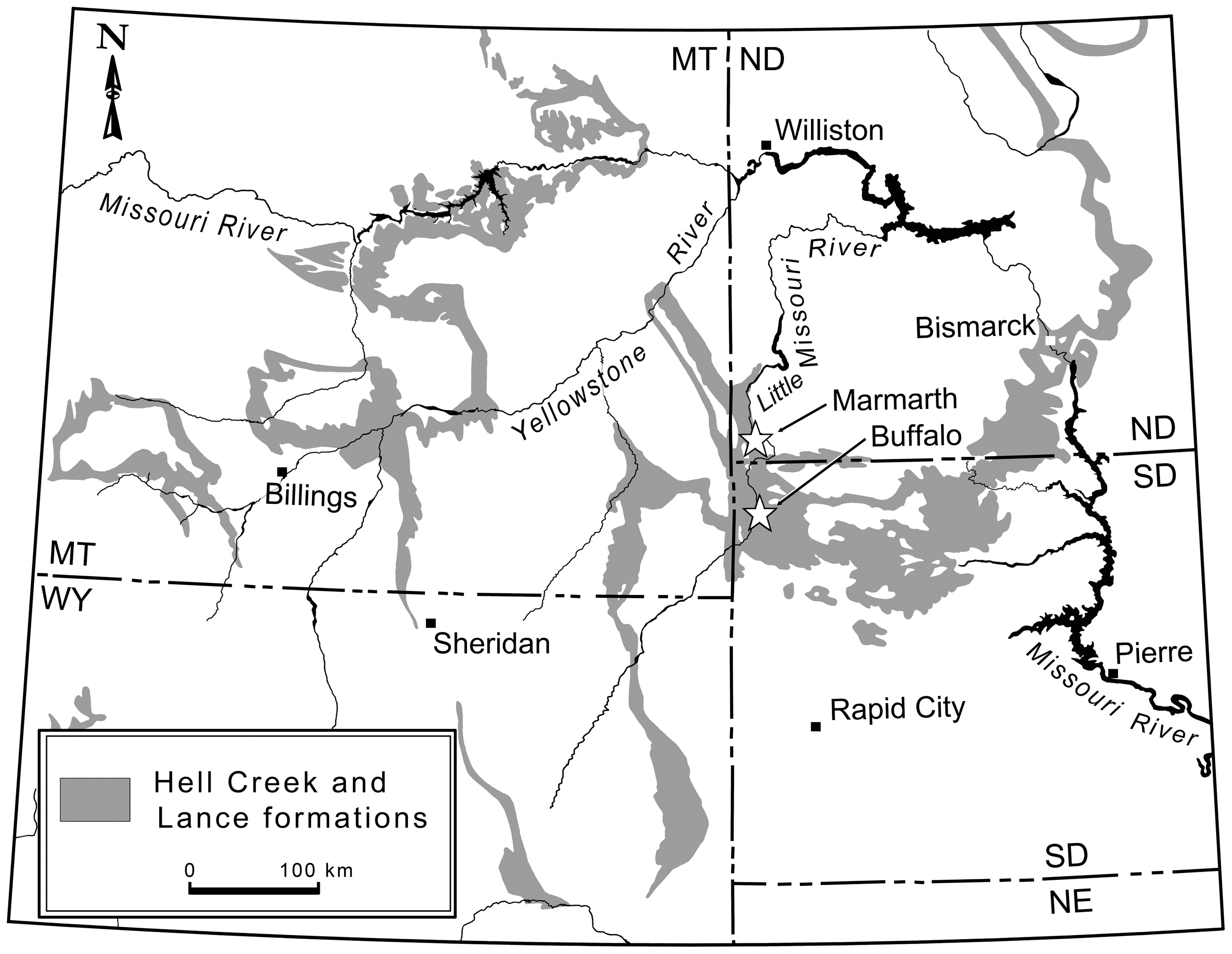
Map of locations yielding Anzu specimens (stars)

In 1998, Fred Nuss of Nuss Fossils discovered the first two partial skeletons of Anzu including the holotype CM 78000 on a private South Dakota ranch, both of which were mostly disarticulated and appeared to have been transported by a water current. A third referred specimen, fragmentary skeleton MRF 319, studied by Tyler Lyson of the National Museum of Natural History, was discovered by Scott Haire, who spotted the bones at his uncle's ranch at Marmarth, North Dakota. Sues later considered that these three partial skeletons were clearly from the same species. The fourth referred specimen is a rear lower jaw fragment first reported in 1993, FMNH PR 2296 (formerly BHM 2033).

These four fossils found at Hell Creek together make up a fairly complete skeleton of Anzu wyliei, comprising about 75 to 80 per cent of the whole skeleton. Three researchers, Emma Schachner of the University of Utah, Matthew Lamanna of the Carnegie Museum of Natural History and Tyler Lyson of the Smithsonian in Washington realized in 2006 that they each had partial skeletons of the same species and began collaborating to study it, assisted by Hans-Dieter Sues, a paleontologist at the National Museum of Natural History of the Smithsonian Institution in Washington. The main fossils are being held at the Carnegie Museum of Natural History in Pittsburgh.

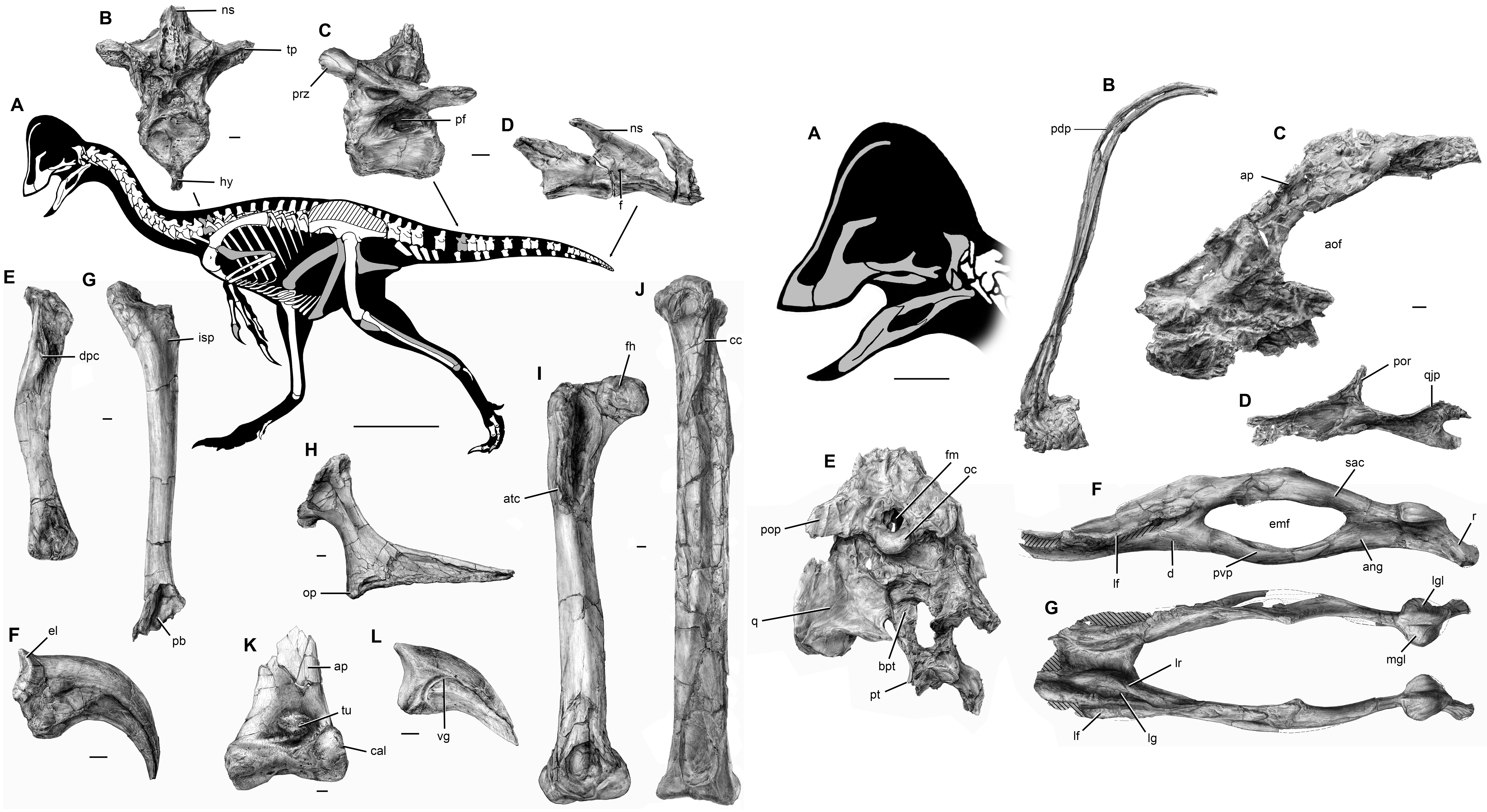
Illustrations of selected elements of the two specimens held at Carnegie Museum (CM 78000 and CM 78001)

The genus is notable as the first well-preserved example of a North American oviraptorosaur. According to Sues, "for almost a hundred years, the presence of oviraptorosaurs in North America was only known from a few bits of skeleton, and the details of their appearance and biology remained a mystery. With the discovery of A. wyliei, we finally have the fossil evidence to show what this species looked like and how it is related to other dinosaurs."

Anzu was listed as one of 2014's "Top 10 New Species" discovered, with the findings being of significant scientific value. It was acknowledged again, in 2015, as an unprecedented discovery of scientific worth by the International Institute for Species Exploration. The creature's appearance – "big crests on their skulls, a beak, no teeth, and a very bird-like skeleton" – and its discovery in the Hell Creek Formation led to it being jokingly nicknamed the "chicken from hell". Matthew Lamanna, who devised the species' name, originally wanted to use a Latin or Greek version of "chicken from hell". However, he found that this nickname does not translate well in those languages, so he eventually settled on evoking and using the name of the bird-like daemon Anzu from the mythology of ancient Sumer, which itself roughly translates to "heavenly eagle". The specific name, wyliei, honors Wylie J. Tuttle, the grandson of one of the museum's donors, Lee B. Foster.

In 2021, Thomas M. Cullen and colleagues described a partial oviraptorosaur skeleton, ROM VP 65884, from the Hell Creek Formation of Montana and assigned it to as cf. (compares well to) A. wyliei. In 2026, Keith Snyder and colleagues described a partial skeleton of A. wyliei from the Lance Formation of Wyoming.

== Description ==
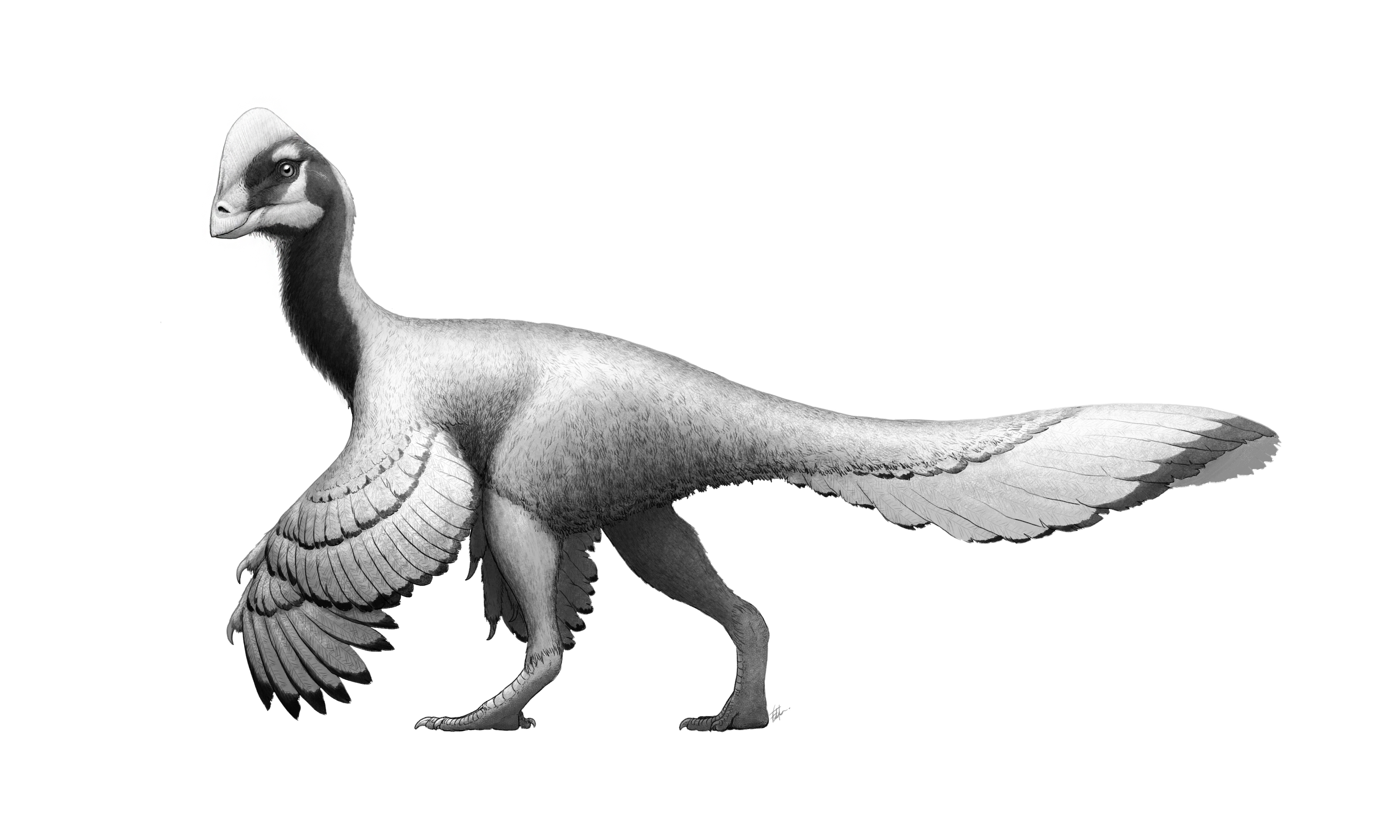
Life restoration

Anzu wyliei is characterized by a toothless beak, a prominent crest, long arms ending in large curved claws, long powerful legs with slender toes, and a relatively short tail. Anzu measured about 3.5–3.75 metres (11.5–12.3 ft) long, up to 1.5 metres (4.9 ft) tall at the hips and 200–300 kilograms (440–660 lb) in body mass, and was among the largest North American oviraptorosaurs.

When the type specimen of Anzu was described, several autapomorphies (derived traits unique to a genus) were established. There is a high crescent-like crest on the skull, formed by the upper branches of the praemaxillae. The occipital condyle is wider than the foramen magnum. The front part of the lower jaw, which is fused with its counterpart, has a prominent flange on its outer side. The retroarticular process, a prominent projection at the rear of the lower jaw, is elongated, about as long as the jaw joint surface. The lower end of the radius is divided into two rounded processes. The first phalanx of the second finger has a trough along the lower edge of its inner side. The front side of the astragalus (ankle bone) has a tubercle at the base of its ascending process.

An additional four possible autapomorphies were identified in the referred specimens. The main body of the maxilla has no depression around the antorbital fenestra. The nasal branch of the maxilla is elongated and constructed like an inverted L. The branch of the jugal towards the quadratojugal is vertically deep. The same branch is forked at its rear end.

== Classification ==
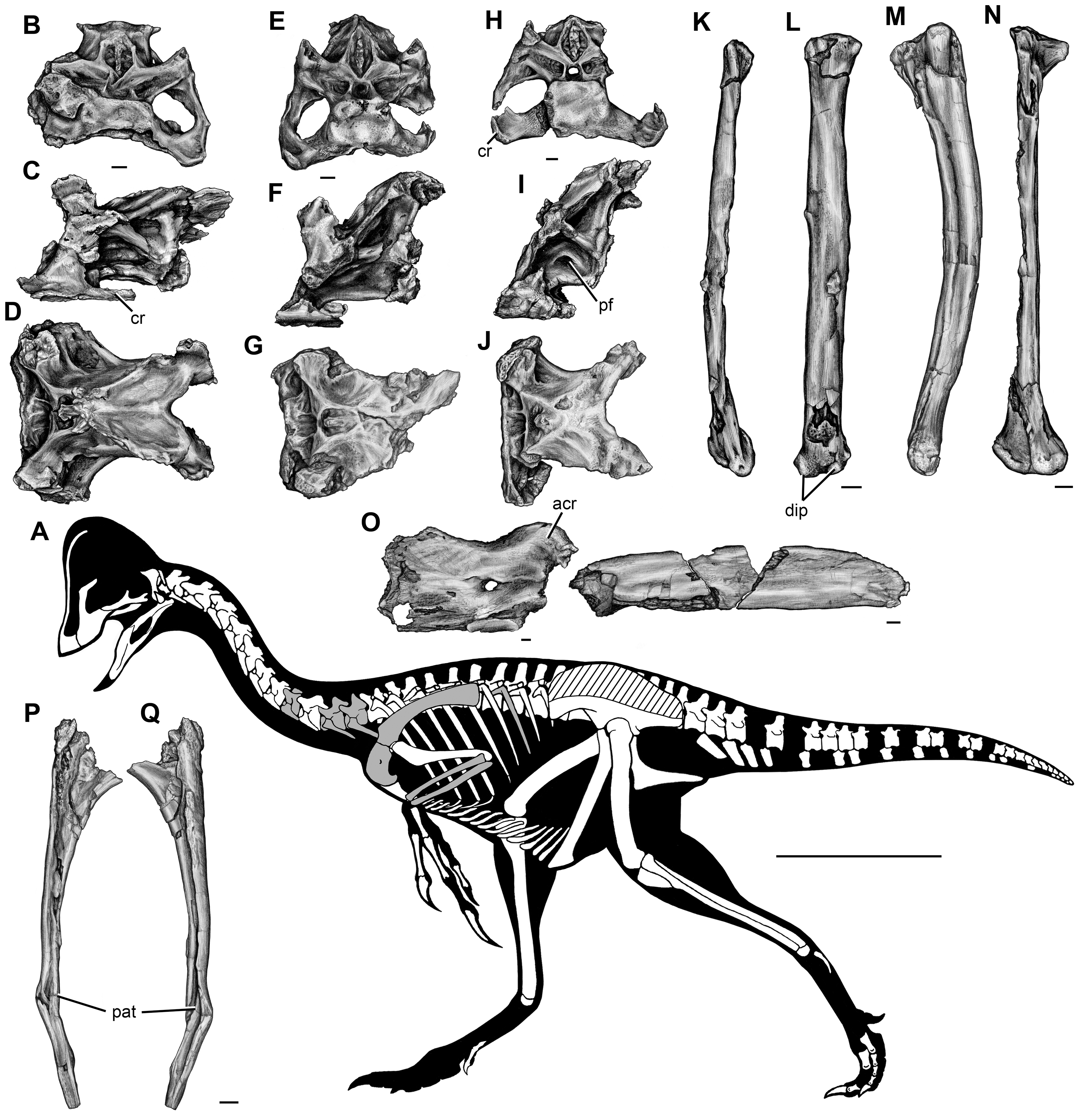
Referred specimen MRF 319

Anzu was placed in the Oviraptorosauria, as a member of the Caenagnathidae. A cladistic analysis showed it was a possible sister species of Caenagnathus.

- Caenagnathoidea
  - Caenagnathidae
    - Microvenator celer
    - - Gigantoraptor erlianensis
      - - Caenagnathasia martinsoni
        - - Alberta dentary morph 3
          - Leptorhynchos gaddisi
          - - "Caenagnathus" sternbergi
            - - Anzu wyliei
              - Caenagnathus collinsi
  - Oviraptoridae

It had been expected that oviraptorosaurs would be found in North America, as well as the documented specimens in Asia, as the two continents had a land connection during the Cretaceous, but the discovery of Anzu wyliei indicates that North American oviraptorosaurs were related more closely to each other than to their counterparts in Asia.

== Paleobiology ==
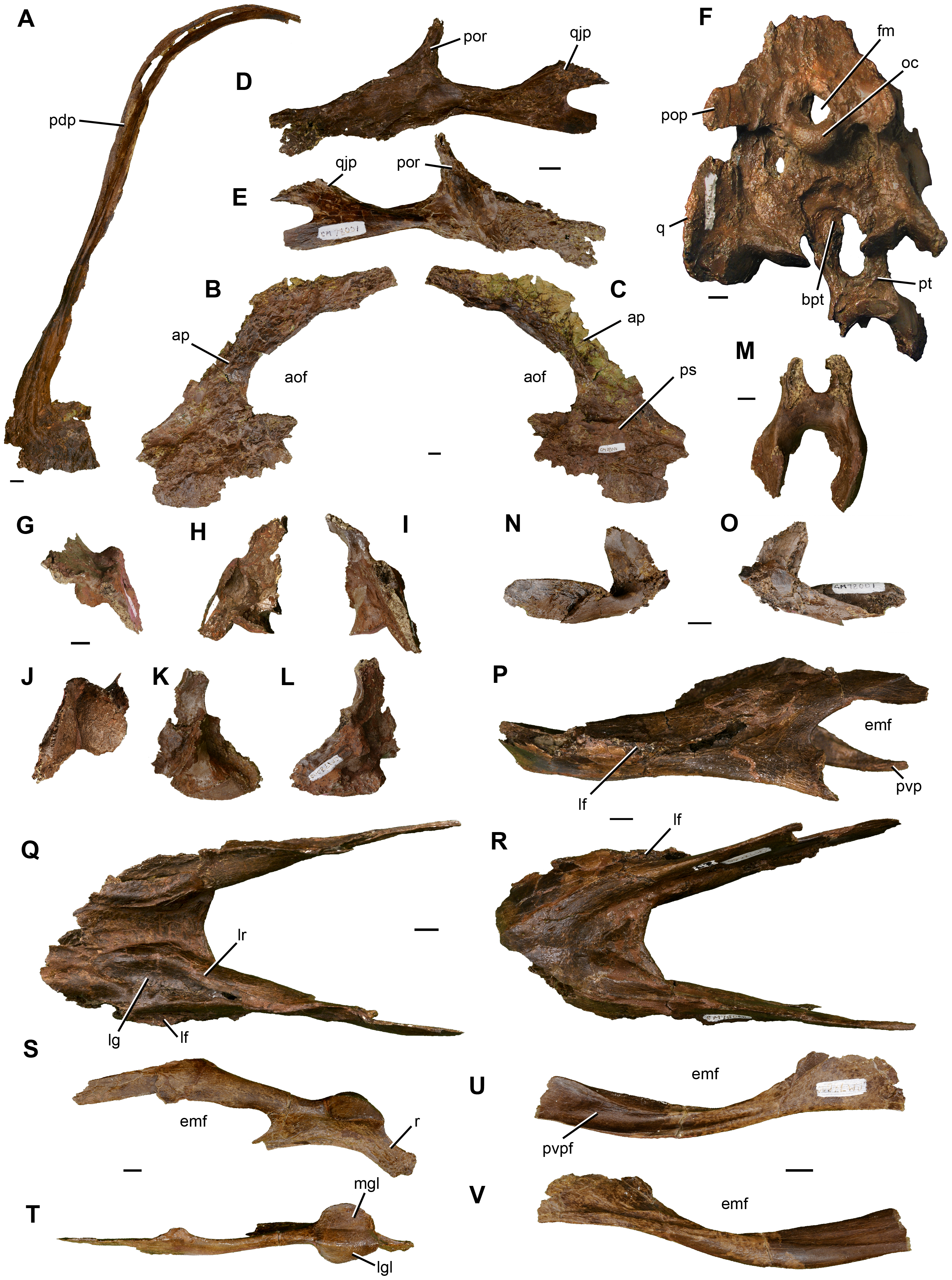
Photos of the skull elements of the Carnegie specimens

Anzu was probably an omnivore or herbivore, although the beak is not as heavily constructed as in the Asian Oviraptoridae. Other differences from its Asian cousins include size – the Asian Oviraptoridae were smaller – as well as thicker legs and different lower jaws.

The fossils of Anzu wyliei were found in mudstone rock that had once been part of ancient floodplains. This indicates that the species likely had a lifestyle significantly different from its Asian counterparts, which lived in arid or semi-arid conditions. Its lifestyle, according to Stephen Brusatte of the University of Edinburgh, was that of "a fast-running, ecological generalist that didn't quite fit the usual moulds of meat-eating or plant-eating dinosaur." Its jaw morphology suggests that it could eat a variety of food items, including vegetation, small animals, and possibly eggs.

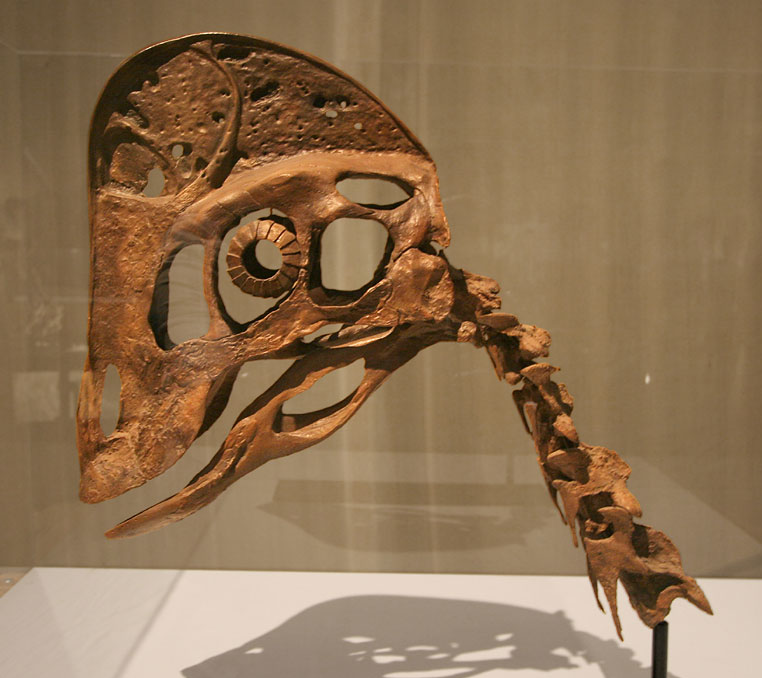
Reconstructed head and neck

While a number of its features were similar to those of modern birds, it was not an avian dinosaur and its line died out in the Cretaceous–Paleogene extinction event 66 million years ago, along with all the rest of the known non-avian dinosaurs. Its bird-like features are instead an example of convergent evolution. Matthew Lamanna comments that "it would have had a lot of birdy behaviors. When people think of a dinosaur, they think of something like a T. rex or a brontosaurus, and when they think of a bird, they think of something like a sparrow or a chicken. This animal, Anzu, has a mosaic of features of both of those groups, and so it basically provides a really nice link in the evolutionary chain."

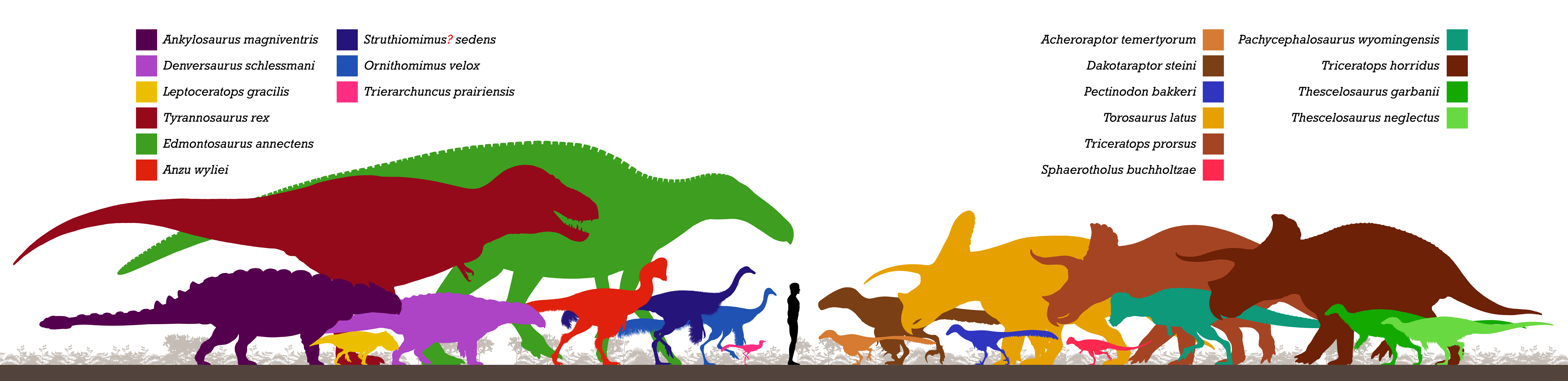
Contemporaneous known Dinosaurs from the Hell Creek Formation (Anzu in red, left)

The purpose of Anzu's large crest is unclear; Sues notes that it "is very large and made of paper-thin bone, so it was not able to take much stress. All oviraptosaurs have this crest but it is certainly the largest in A. wyliei. The most likely function is for display, showing off to members of your own species. The Australian cassowary has a similar crest which is thought to be used to attract mates, so it is possible that A. wyliei could have used its crest in a similar fashion." The fossils showed evidence of injuries, including a healed broken rib and an arthritic toe that was probably the result of a tendon being ripped away from the bone (an avulsion fracture). It is not known whether this indicates that the animals fought each other, or were injured by predators.

== See also ==
- Timeline of oviraptorosaur research
