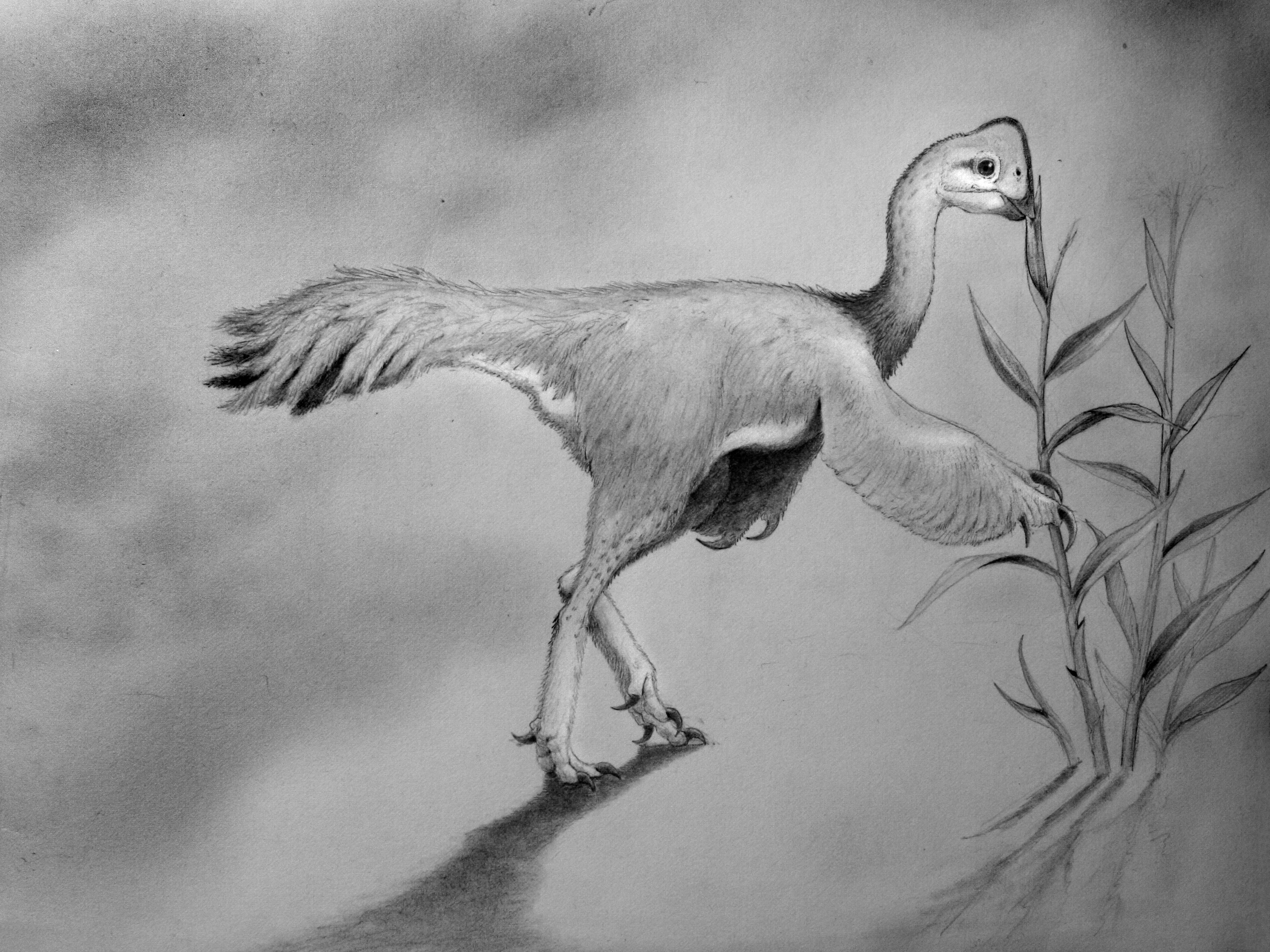
- Life reconstruction of L. gaddisi by one of the authors of its description

Scientific classification
- Kingdom: Animalia
- Phylum: Chordata
- Clade: Dinosauria
- Clade: Saurischia
- Clade: Theropoda
- Clade: †Oviraptorosauria
- Superfamily: †Caenagnathoidea
- Family: †Caenagnathidae
- Genus: †Leptorhynchos; Longrich et al., 2013

Type species
- †Leptorhynchos gaddisi Longrich et al., 2013

Other species
- †L. elegans?

= Leptorhynchos gaddisi =

Leptorhynchos Temporal range: Late Cretaceous ~80.5 to 72 Ma - Campanian

Extinct species of dinosaur

Leptorhynchos (/ˌlɛptəuˈrɪŋkəus/) is an extinct genus of caenagnathid theropod from the Late Cretaceous of what is now the US state of Texas, although it has been suggested to also exist in Alberta and South Dakota. The type species is L. gaddisi, and it is currently the only widely accepted valid species. The generic name of Leptorhynchos comes from the Greek "leptos" meaning "small" and "rhynchos" meaning "beak". The specific epithet is in honor of the Gaddis family, who owned the land on which the holotype was discovered.

== Discovery ==
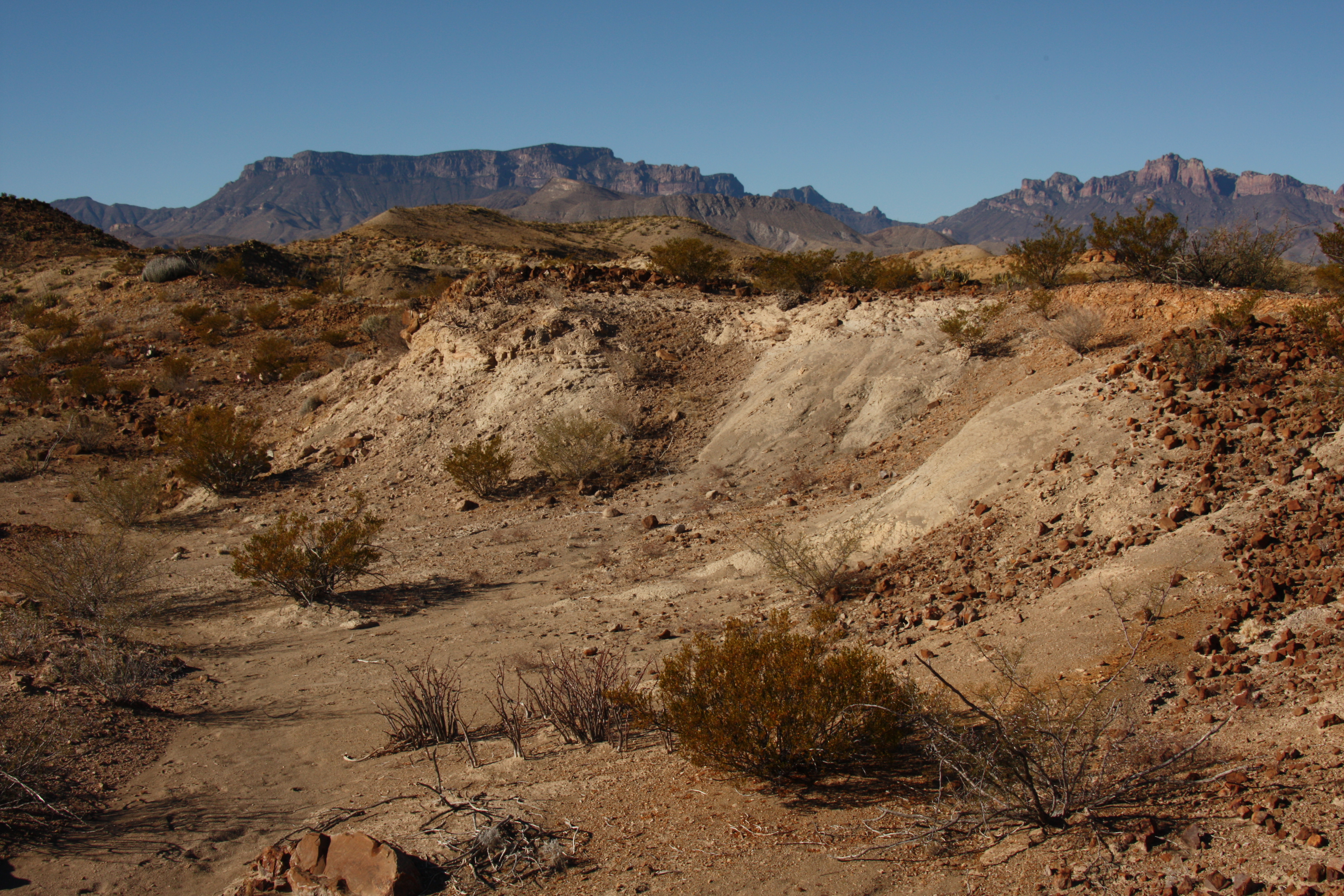
A picture of an outcrop of the Aguja Formation at Big Bend National Park

Leptorhynchos was named in 2013 by Nick Longrich, Ken Barnes, Scott Clark, and Larry Millar. In their description, they conducted a specimen-level review of North American caenagnathids in an attempt to resolve the perennial taxonomic confusion surrounding the group. This included the type specimens of Caenagnathus, Chirostenotes, and Hagryphus as well as specimens of more ambiguous affinities such as ROM 781, which was previously named as a species of Ornithomimus. Their analysis also included the specimen TMM 45920-1, which would later be designated as the holotype of Leptorhynchos gaddisi.

The results of Longrich and colleagues' analysis was the naming of the new genus, Leptorhynchos, and the assignment of "Ornithomimus" elegans (specimen ROM 781) as a second species in that genus. Several other specimens, such as MOR 1107, were referred to the genus but not assigned to a particular species. Their description contained an initial and then a revised diagnosis of the genus and both species. Remains of other small caenagnathids from Laramidia discovered in the Hell Creek and Scollard formations have variously been attributed to the genus, but without being assigned to either of the named species.

== Description ==
=== Species ===
Leptorhynchos gaddisi

L. gaddisi was named as the type species of the new genus by Longrich and colleagues. They based the diagnosis of this species on the anteriorly-projected beak tip, rounded ventral margin of the dentary symphysis, and a spoon-shape to the beak tip in dorsal view. Longrich and colleagues did not provide a mass estimate in their description but Rubén Molina-Pérez and Asier Larramendi suggested a length of 1.75 metres (5.7 ft) and a mass of roughly 19 kilograms (42 lb). L. gaddisi is generally regarded as the only valid species of Leptorhynchos.

"Leptorhynchos" elegans

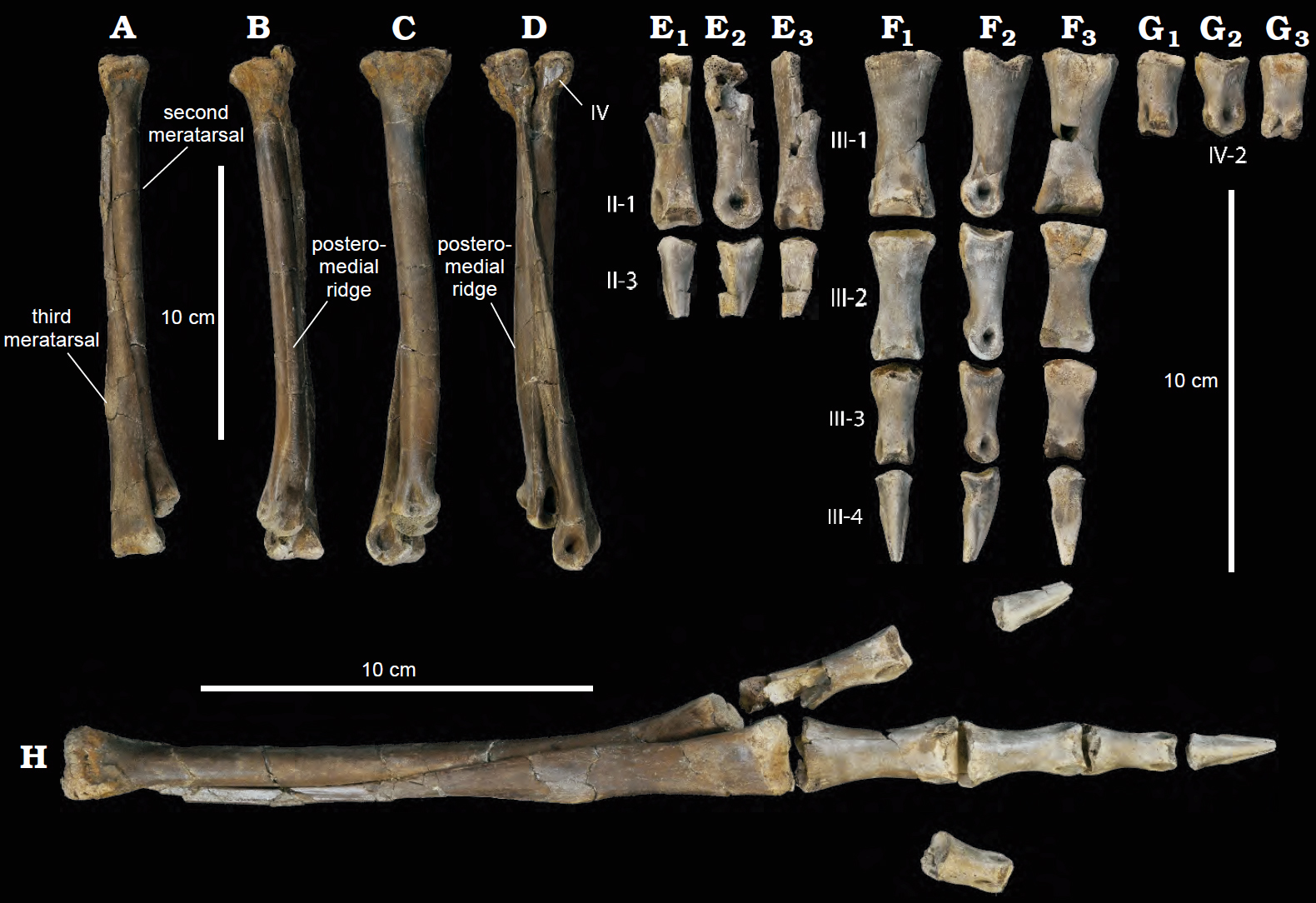
The holotype material of Citipes (formerly Leptorhycnhos elegans)

The fossil specimen ROM 781 was described in 1933 as a new species of the genus Ornithomimus. I was later reassigned to the genus Magrophalangia (now a junior synonym of Chirostenotes), then to Elmisaurus, and then to Chirostenotes before being named by Longrich and colleagues as the type specimen of the new species L. elegans. They made this diagnosis based on the strongly upturned beak and straight anterior margin of the dentary symphysis and also referred the specimen TMP 1992.36.390 to the species. However, in their phylogenetic analysis which accompanied the description, the authors remarked that the two species form a polytomy with one another within Caenagnathidae and they may not represent the same genus. In 2020, Gregory Funston reassigned L. elegans to the new genus, Citipes. Leptorhynchos has not been included in any phylogenetic analyses with Citipes since the most recent referral, so the veracity of this reassignment has yet to be tested by new authors in order to affirm or contest it.

Leptorhynchos sp.

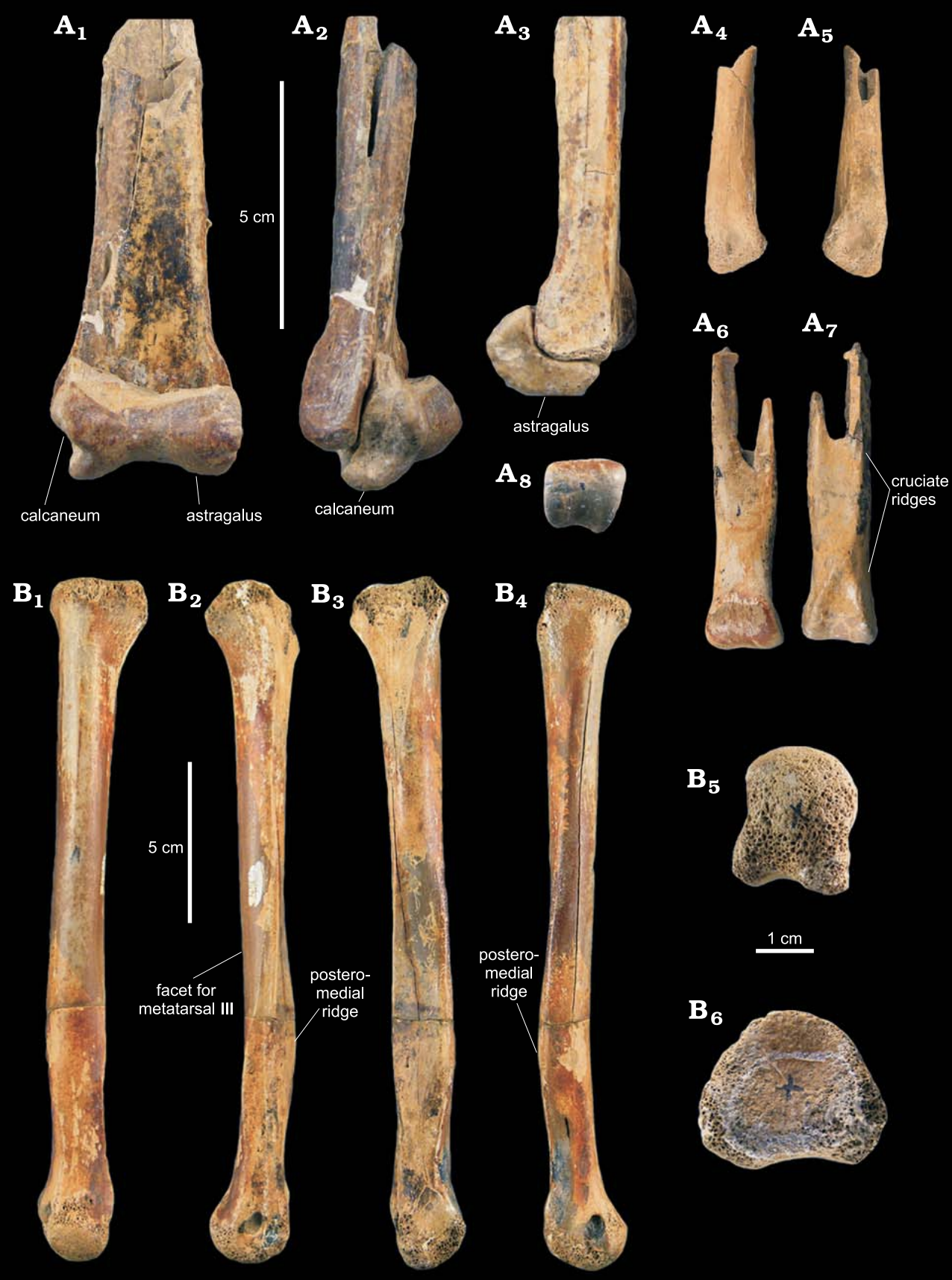
Caenagnathid bones from the Frenchman Formation which may have belonged to Leptorhynchos

In their description of the genus, Longrich and colleagues referred the specimen MOR 1107 (part of a mandible) to Leptorhynchos, but they did not assign it to either of the species they named. Although the bones are convex in profile, similar to Chirostenotes, its smaller size led them to refer it to Leptorhynchos. Other small caenagnathid remains have been variously referred to the genus since it was named, although none have been named as a their own species. Among these are caenagnathid remains from the late Maastrichtian Scollard Formation, the Frenchman Formation, and the Hell Creek Formation. Subsequent authors have disputed these referrals. More caenagnathid remains have also recently been described from the Aguja Formation, which have been speculated to belong to Leptorhynchos.

=== Skeleton ===
The holotype of Leptorhynchos gaddisi, given the designation TMM 45920-1, is a single fused mandible. Additional specimens were also referred to the species in the paper describing it. These include a caudal vertebra, the partial third and fourth metatarsals, and a single toe claw. These specimens were not associated with the holotype, but were referred to L. gaddisi based on their size and discovery in the same geologic layer. Later authors have questioned this referral and Leptorhynchos has not been included in some recent analyses.

The dentaries of the holotype were fully fused with no visible sutures, which suggest that the animal was fully mature when it died and the small size of the specimen is not the result of ontogeny. This was one of the primary reasons that Leptorhynchos was named as a new species instead of an immature Chirostenotes, which it closely resembled in shape but which was much larger. The interior surface of the jaw had several furrows and a lingual shelf with a ridge along its margin. The mandible itself was much more elongated than members of oviraptoridae, but was proportionally relatively short for a caenagnathid.

The referred specimens from the Aguja Formation are tentatively assigned to this taxon. They include a single partial vertebra, two partial metatarsals, and a pedal ungual. The vertebra is unremarkable with twin pleurocoels on each side of the vertebral centrum. The metatarsals strongly resemble those of Citipes, which was part of the basis for the initial referral of that taxon to the genus Leptorhynchos. The metatarsals are also fused to the tarsal bones, which is the condition seen in both Citipes and Elmisaurus.

== Classification ==
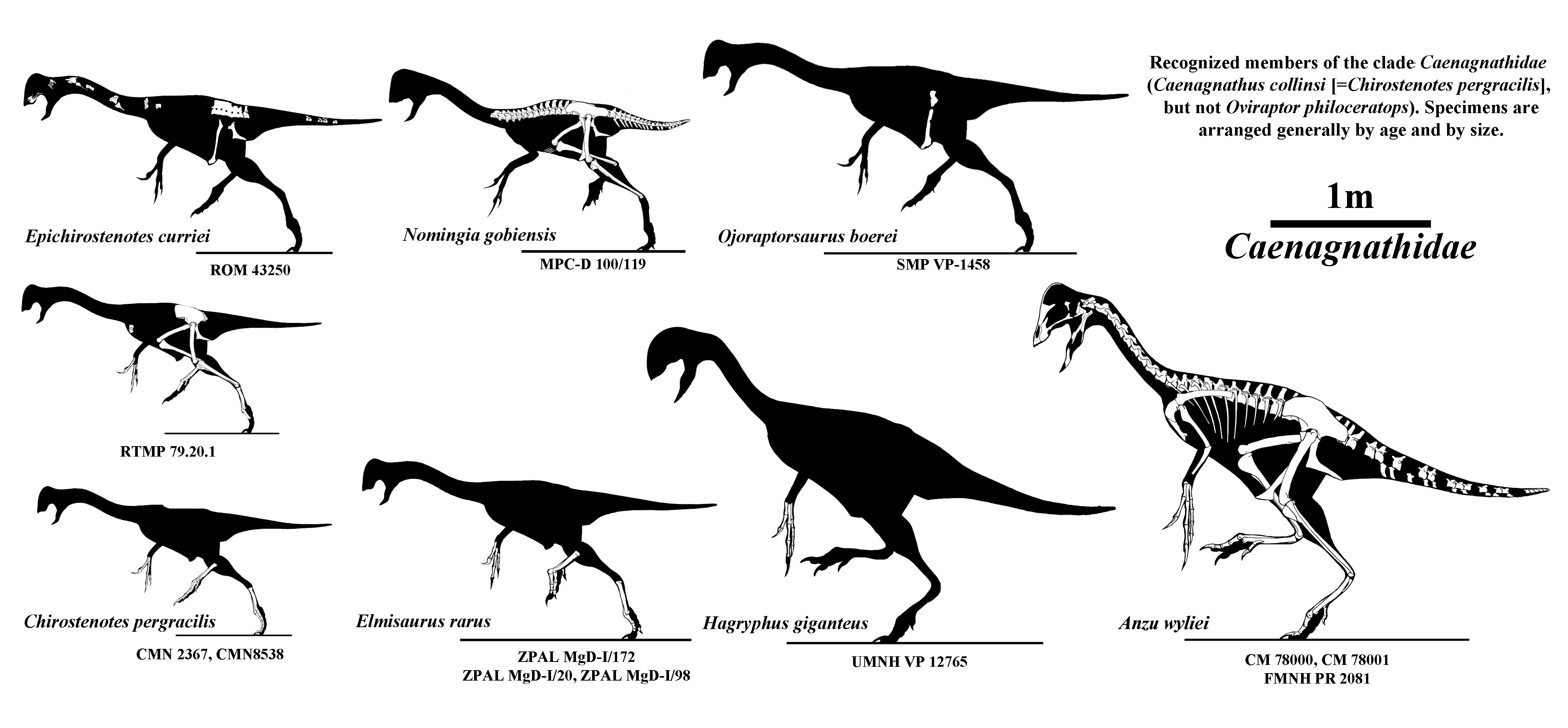
Diagram of most known caenagnathid remains

In their description of the holotype, Longrich and colleagues conducted a phylogenetic analysis. Their analysis used the dataset of Longrich's earlier publication in 2010 with several new taxa added for a total of 28 taxa coded for 205 characters. Their data set also included recent information about Nemegtomaia and Nomingia which had been published since the analysis in 2010. The monophyly of caenagnathidae was supported in their analysis based on the following diagnostic characters: fused dentaries, a ventrally bowed process on the underside of the dentary, the lack of contact between the dentary and the mandibular fenestra, and a shallow surangular bone. The analysis did resolve several taxa at the base of caenagnathidae including Gigantoraptor and Microvenator, but there was less resolution in the more derived area of the tree. In particular, their strict consensus tree did not support the unambiguous monophyly of the genus Leptorhynchos; the two species they assigned to the genus were in a polytomy with Hagryphus and a clade containing Caenagnathus, Chirostenotes, and the specimen BMNH 2033 (which is from the Hell Creek Formation and was coded as a distinct taxon). The authors remark that they referred ROM 781 to Leptorhynchos because of the similar size of the two species, but noted that they may belong to separate genera, pending further research.

Longrich and colleagues broadly determined that most caenagnathid genera are diagnosed by characteristics of the mandible and manus, which allows researchers to diagnose genera and species based on very incomplete remains, but which also means that more complete remains are undiagnostic if they do not preserve the mandible or manus. However, the authors note that the shape of the beak in modern birds is an important diagnostic trait, as well as in some dinosaurs like Triceratops and Edmontosaurus, so they argue that it is not unreasonable to assume that this may be sufficient in naming new genera or species. Furthermore, the degree of fusion exhibited by the jaw bones, as well as their surface texture, can be indicative of ontogenetic age in many oviraptorosaurs, which can be used to determine if an individual specimen is a new taxon or simply a different life stage of an existing taxon.

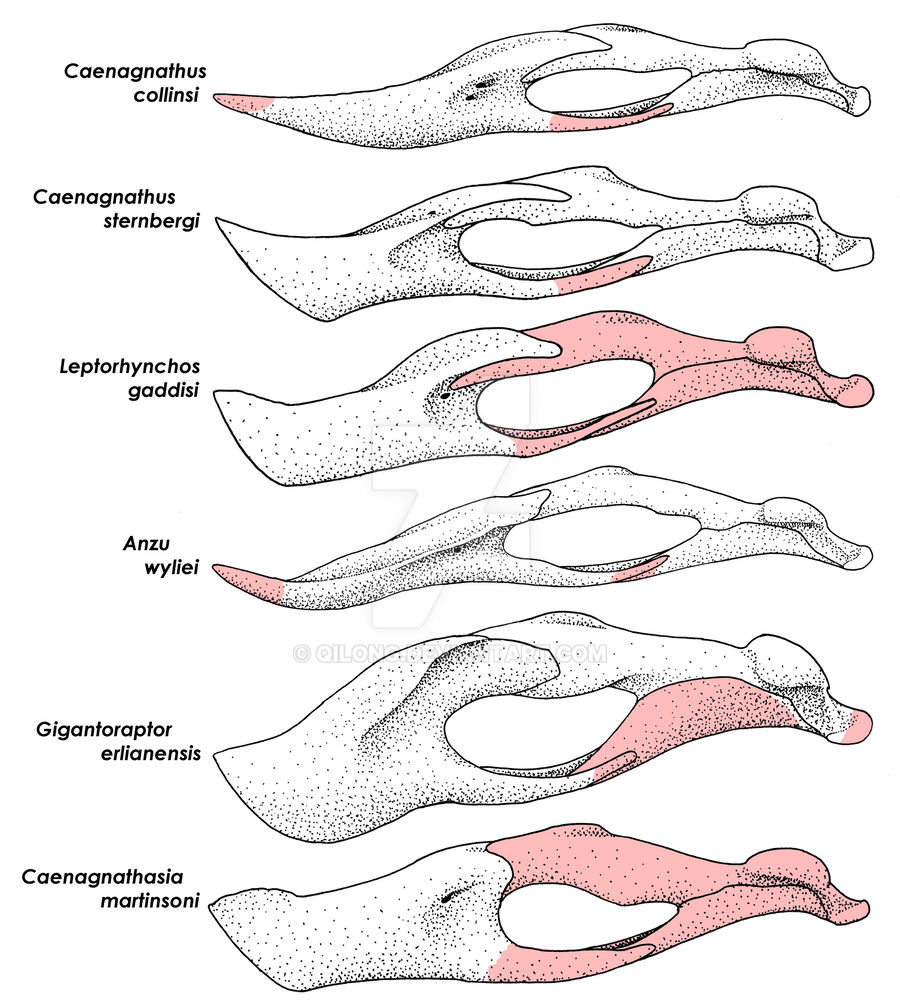
Caenagnathid mandibles, including that of L. gaddisi (third from top)

For specimens which do not contain the relevant diagnostic characters or any indication of their ontogenetic age, they have been assigned to existing taxa according to size and locality. Longrich and colleagues note that this approach has shortcomings, but they argue that the ecological abundance of adult animals in any ecosystem means that most fossilized animals will be adults anyways, which they suggest is sufficient for the purposes of their analysis. A consensus of the 116 most parsimonious trees in their analysis is shown below.

- Oviraptorosauria
  - Incisivosaurus
  - - Caudipteridae
    - - Avimimidae
      - Caenagnathoidea
        - Oviraptoridae
          - Oviraptorinae
            - Oviraptor
            - - Rinchenia
              - - Citipati
                - Zamyn Khondt oviraptorid
          - Heyuaniinae
            - Khaan
            - - Conchoraptor
              - - Machairasaurus
                - - Heyuannia
                  - Ingenia
                  - Nemegtomaia
        - Caenagnathidae
          - Microvenator
          - - Gigantoraptor
            - - Caenagnathasia
              - Elmisaurus
              - Caenagnathinae
                - Leptorhynchos elegans
                - Leptorhynchos gaddisi
                - Hagryphus
                - - Chirostenotes
                  - - Caenagnathus collinsi
                    - Caenagnathus sp.

The most recent phylogenetic analysis including Leptorhynchos was the one conducted by Sungjin Lee, Yuong-Nam Lee, Anusuya Chinsamy, Junchang Lü, Rinchen Barsbold, and Khishigjav Tsogtbaatar in their description of the new genus Gobiraptor. Their analysis used the data set from an earlier study which included several of the same authors when they described Huanansaurus. Lee and colleagues were primarily interested in oviraptoridae, but they included most known caenagnathid genera in their analysis. They recovered Leptorhynchos and Citipes (then L. elegans) in a polytomy with the genera Elmisaurus and Apatoraptor within a monophyletic "elmisaurinae". They do not comment any further on the implications of this analysis on caenagnathid phylogeny. Subsequent analyses which have not included Leptorhynchos have not recovered these taxa as being closely related.

- Caenagnathoidea
  - Oviraptoridae
  - Caenagnathidae
    - Microvenator
    - - Gigantoraptor
      - - Caenagnathasia
        - Caenagnathus
        - Anzu
        - Hagryphus
        - Epichirostenotes
        - - Chirostenotes
          - Elmisaurinae
            - Leptorhynchos elegans
            - Leptorhynchos gaddisi
            - Elmisaurus
            - Apatoraptor

== Paleoecology ==
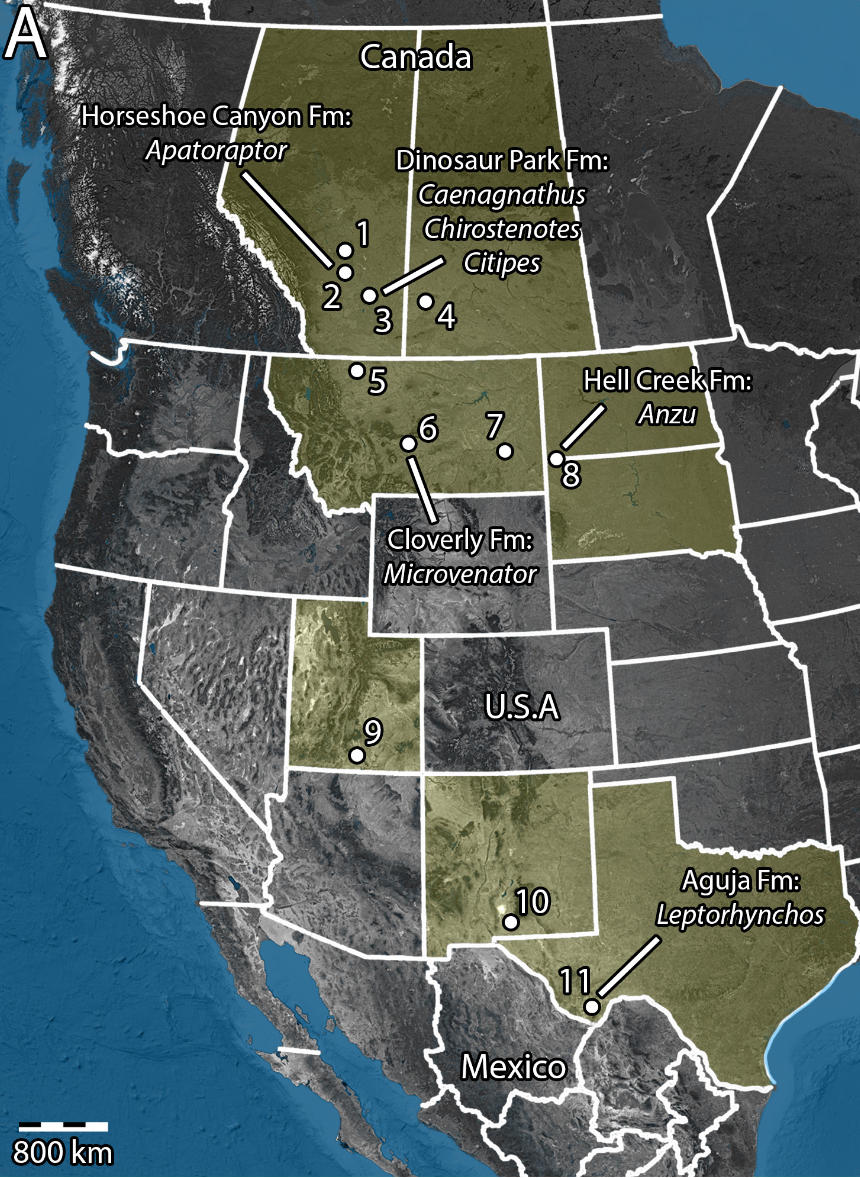
A map of known caenagnathid remains from North America

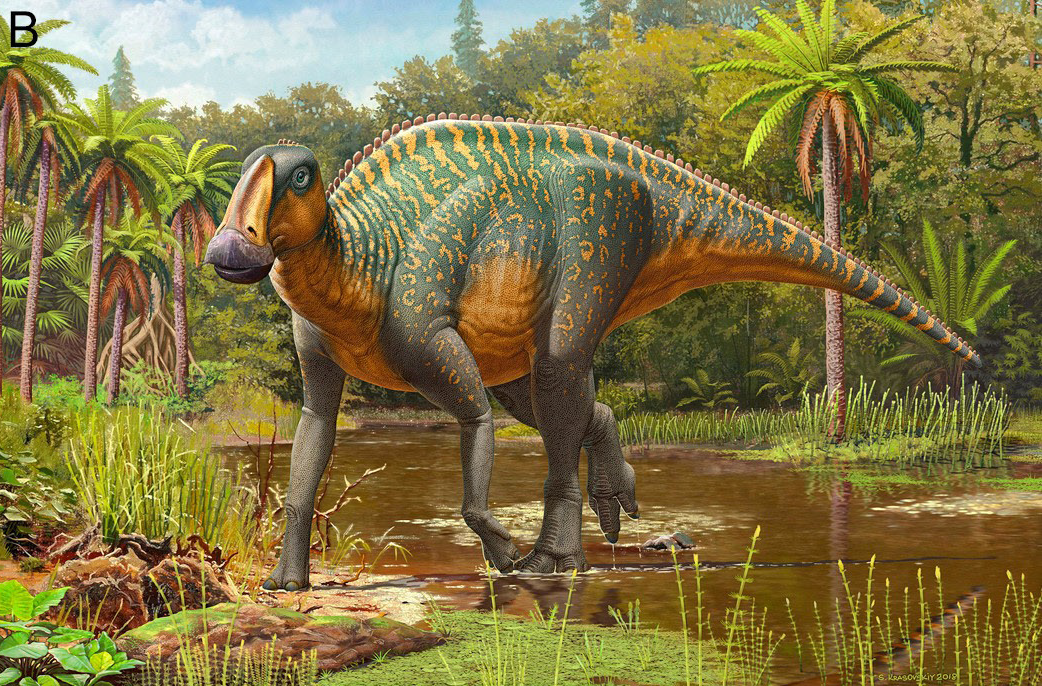
A reconstruction of a hadrosaur from the Kirtland Formation, which would have been climatically similar to the Aguja Formation

=== Paleoenvironment ===
The only definite remains of Leptorhynchos have been recovered from the Upper Shale Member of the Aguja Formation near the town of Terlingua, Texas. The Upper Shale Member is made up of mudstone, carbonaceous shale, lignite, and sandstone. During the Cretaceous Period, this area would have been a freshwater or brackish coastal marsh and a floodplain that was part of a river delta. The sediments also record the presence of oxbow lakes and some coastal marine deposits.

=== Contemporary fauna ===
A wide variety of vertebrates have been unearthed from other outcrops of the Aguja Formation in both Texas and Coahuila, Mexico. The rocks preserve both littoral and marine environments in which the fossils of sharks, bony fish, ammonites, and tetrapods have all been found. However, Leptorhynchos is only known from the Upper Shale Member of the formation, which preserves a different faunal assemblage from the older deposits. The Upper Shale Member, where Leptorhynchos was found, preserves a freshwater ecosystem with very few marine animals.

A wide variety of turtles have been found from this period including Adocus, Basilemys, and Chupacabrachelys, the latter of which is only known from the Aguja Formation. Remains of numerous other turtles have been discovered including trionychids, baenids, and kinsternoids, but these have not been referred to any existing species. A wide variety of squamates have also been found in these areas including anguids, scincomorphs, varanoids, and snakes. The giant alligatorid Deinosuchus riograndensis has also been found in the Aguja Formation, but is not known from the Upper Shale Member.

Dinosaurs are the largest animals found in the Aguja Formation, and the taxa found in these rocks is broadly similar to contemporaneous faunal assemblages in the Kaiparowits, Dinosaur Park, and Judith River formations. Hadrosaurs are diverse in the Upper Shale Member and include Angulomasticator, Maleficia, and possibly Kritosaurus. Ceratopsids are also present. Chasmosaurines are also represented by two species of Agujaceratops and the centrosaurines are represented by the nasutoceratopsin Yehuecauhceratops. At least one pachycephalosaur, Texacephale is known from cranial remains. Both major groups of ankylosaurs were also present in the Upper Shale Member, although the precise identification of these specimens remains uncertain. Most ankylosaur remains from the Aguja Formation consist only of osteoderms and vertebrae. These have been referred to the genera Edmontonia, Euoplocephalus, and Panoplosaurus.

Saurischians are also present in large numbers in the Upper Shale Member. These consist exclusively of theropods because sauropods appear to be completely absent in North America until later in the Cretaceous. Leptorhynchos is the only theropod from the Upper Shale Member that has been named. The rest of the theropod remains have been referred to existing genera. Teeth and other fragmentary remains indicate that ornithomimosaurs, dromaeosaurids, troodontids, tyrannosaurids, and caenagnathids were present in the region during the Late Cretaceous. A few specimens have been referred to the genera Chirostenotes, Saurornitholestes, Dromaeosaurus, Troodon, and the enigmatic Richardoestesia, but these referrals remain uncertain.

== See also ==
- 2013 in paleontology
- Cretaceous land vertebrate ages
- Laramidia
- List of vertebrate fauna of the Maastrichtian stage
- Timeline of oviraptorosaur research
