= Aguja Formation =

Geological formation in North America

- Stratigraphic range: Lower to Middle Campanian; ~81.5–76.9 Ma
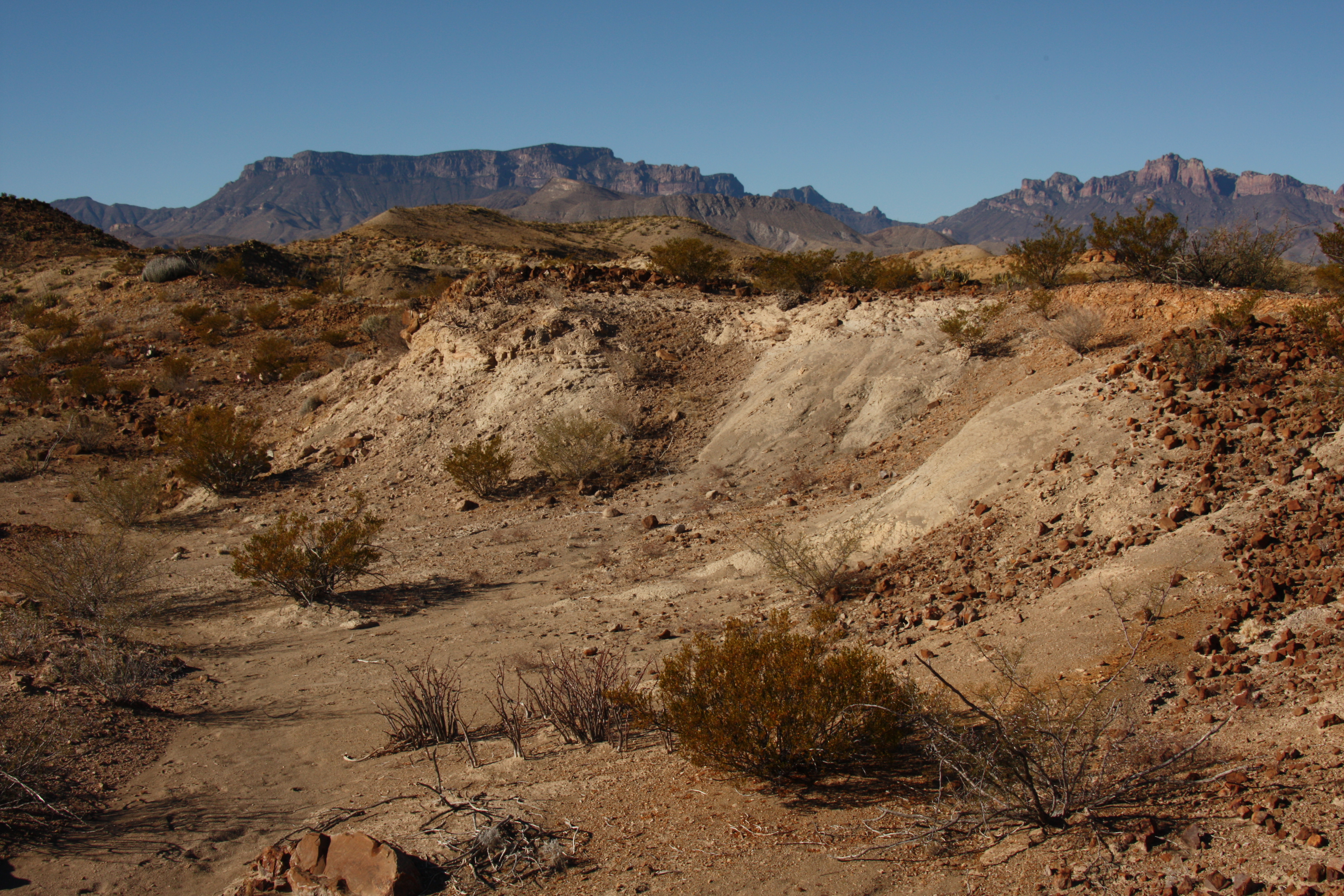
- Outcrops of the Aguja Formation, Big Bend National Park, Texas
- Type: Geological formation
- Unit of: Tornillo Group
- Sub-units: La Basa Sandstone Member, Rattlesnake Mountain Sandstone Member, Terlingua Creek Sandstone Member, Abajo Shale Member, and Alto Shale Member
- Underlies: Javelina Formation
- Overlies: Pen Formation

Lithology
- Primary: Sandstone, conglomerate, claystone
- Other: Mudstone, shale, limestone

Location
- Coordinates: 29.3°N 103.5°W
- Approximate paleocoordinates: 35.8°N 77.0°W
- Region: Texas, Chihuahua, Coahuila
- Country: United States, Mexico
- Aguja Formation (the United States) Aguja Formation (Texas)

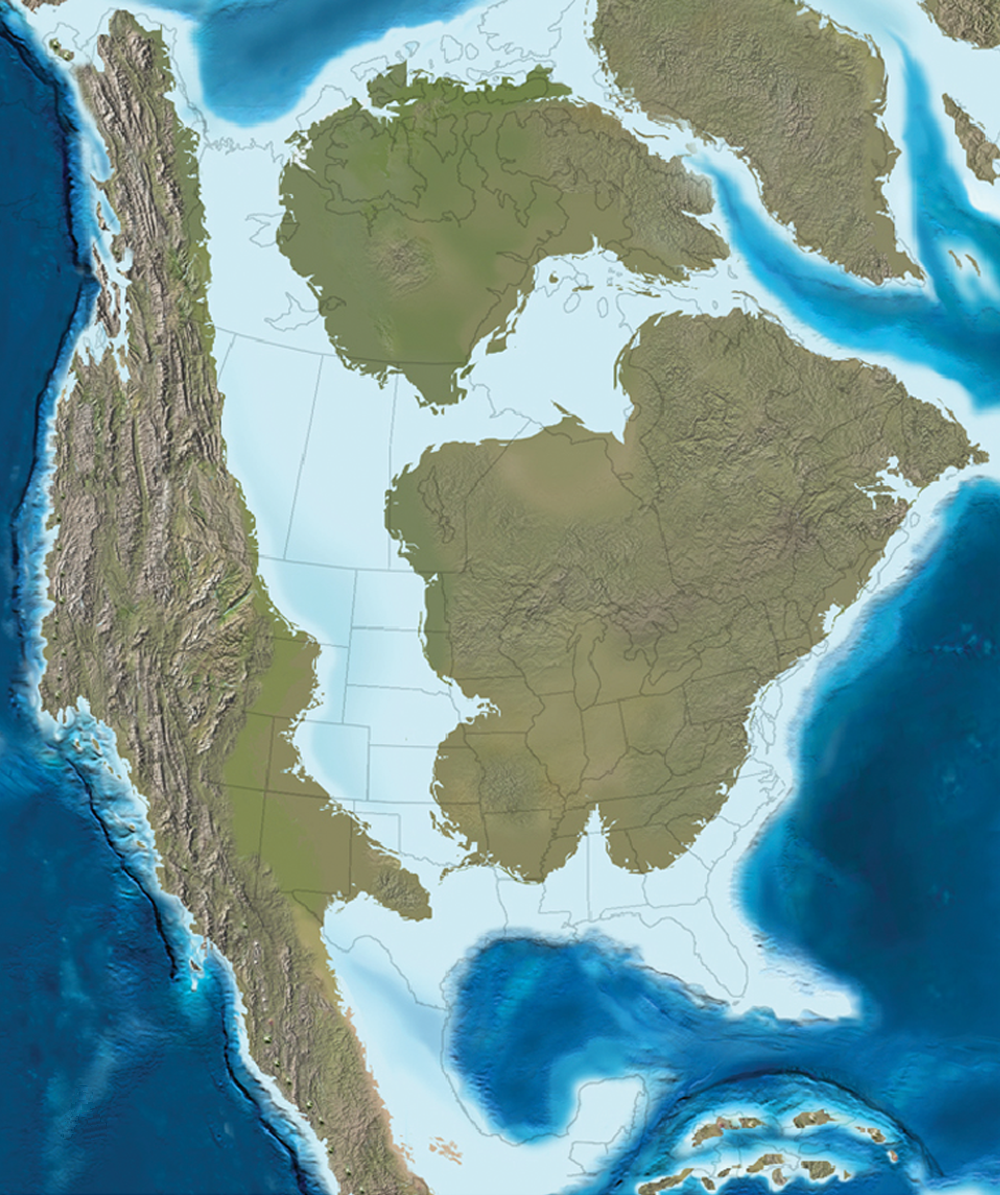
Paleogeography of the Campanian

The Aguja Formation is a geological formation in North America, exposed in Texas, United States and Chihuahua and Coahuila in Mexico, whose strata date back to the Late Cretaceous. Dinosaur remains are among the fossils that have been recovered from the formation. Fossil palms have also been unearthed here.

== Age ==
The ages of the Aguja Formation and its primary fossil-bearing unit, the Alto Shale, are not well understood. Due to the presence of the ammonite Baculites mclearni, which only occurs from 80.67 - 80.21 Ma, in the underlying Rattlesnake Mountain Sandstone and the Terlingua Creek Sandstone, it is likely that the Upper Shale was younger than 80.2 Ma. A radiometric date of 76.9 Ma was recovered in the Alto Shale, making it likely the formation wasn't younger than 76.9 Ma. The contact with the overlying Javelina Formation has been estimated at 70 Ma ago but also as recently as 68.5 million years ago. This is unlikely, however, due to the presence of Bravoceratops, more primitive than an unnamed chasmosaurine from the De-na-zin Member of the Kirtland Formation, in the lowermost section of the formation. The age of the La Basa Sandstone is constrained by the presence of Scaphites hippocrepis III in the overlying Pen Formation which has been dated as old as 81.53 Ma.

== Paleofauna ==
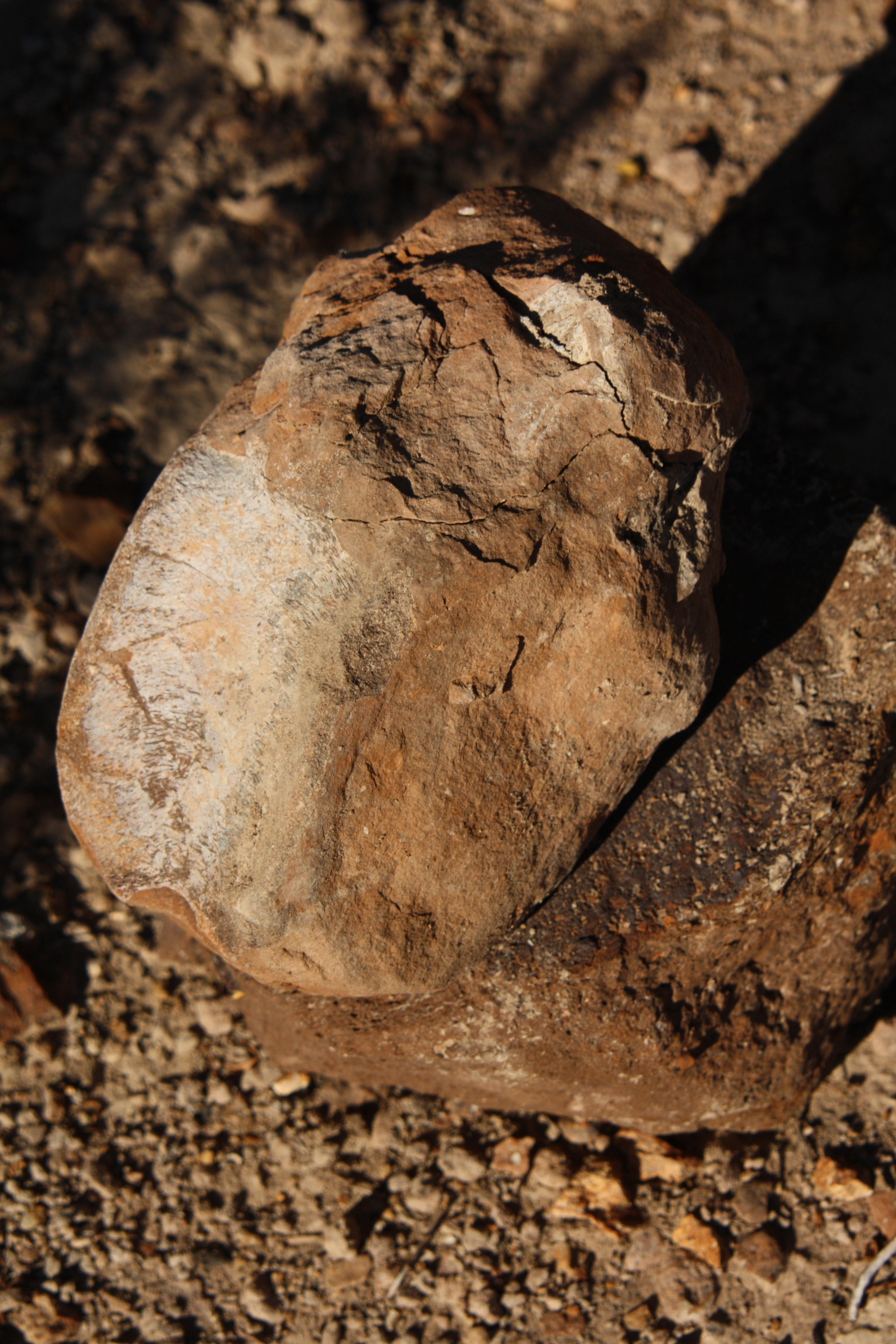
A duckbilled dinosaur (Hadrosauridae) caudal vertebra from the Aguja Formation

=== Reptiles ===
2 fragmentary caudal vertebrae of indeterminate reptiles are known from the Rattlesnake Mountain sandstone member. Montellano-Ballesteros (2003) and Rivera-Sylva et al. (2006) reported indeterminate titanosaur fossils of Mexico as specimens from the upper portion of the Aguja Formation, but D'Emic et al. (2010) questioned the titanosaurian identity of the fossils reported by Montellano-Ballesteros (2003), and Rivera-Sylva and Carpenter (2014) suggested that all of the purported Aguja Formation titanosaur fossils are actually recovered from the lower portion of the Maastrichtian-aged Javelina Formation.

==== Ornithischians ====
===== Hadrosaurs =====
Hadrosaurs of the Aguja Formation
Genus	Species	Location	Member	Material	Notes	Images
Angulomastacator	A. daviesi	Texas	Middle Alto Shale	A left maxilla.	A lambeosaurine.	
Aquilarhinus	A. palimentus	Texas	Middle Abajo Shale	Partial skeleton	Formerly referred to Kritosaurus and Gryposaurus.	
aff. Kritosaurus	K. navajovius	Texas	Upper Alto Shale	Two dentary teeth	Tooth crown morphology matches with Kritosaurus	
Malefica	M. deckerti	Texas	Middle Alto Shale	A partial left maxilla.	Formerly referred to Kritosaurus.	
Saurolophinae	Indeterminate	Texas	Alto Shale	Various cranial and appendicular elements	Material from several localities previously referred to Kritosaurus but lacking its diagnostic features.	
Saurolophinae	Indeterminate	Texas	Alto Shale	Various manual elements and vertebrae representing two individuals	Included in phylogenetic analyses as the "Big Bend OTU", most recently considered a kritosaurin	

===== Marginocephalians =====
Marginocephalians of the Aguja Formation
Genus	Species	Location	Member	Material	Notes	Images
Agujaceratops	A. mariscalensis	Texas	Lower Alto Shale		Formerly considered a species of Chasmosaurus	
Agujaceratops	A. mavericus	West Texas	Middle Alto Shale		A chasmosaurine.	
Ceratopsidae genus & species indeterminate	Indeterminate	West Texas	Middle Abajo Shale	Ilia, sacral vertebra & sacral ribs.	May represent Agujaceratops, but undiagnostic.	
Chasmosaurus	C. mariscalensis	Texas		[Twelve] disarticulated skull (sic), postcrania, juvenile."	Considered by paleontologists Lucas, Sullivan, and Hunt to be distinct enough from the Chasmosaurus type species, C. belli to warrant being split off to a new genus, Agujaceratops.	
Texacephale	T. langstoni	Texas	Lower Alto Shale	Two frontoparietal domes.	A pachycephalosaur.	
Yehuecauhceratops	Y. mudei	Coahuila			A centrosaurine.	

===== Thyreophorans =====
Thyreophorans of the Aguja Formation
Genus	Species	Location	Member	Material	Notes	Images
Ankylosauridae	Indeterminate	Texas	Lower Alto Shale	Osteoderms, vertebrae & limb elements.	Remains of an ankylosaurid, possibly represents Euoplocephalus sp.	
Edmontonia	E. sp	Texas	Lower Alto Shale	Osteoderm (TVP 45866-2) & skull (AMNH 3076).	A nodosaurid.	
cf. Euoplocephalus	E. sp	Texas	Lower Alto Shale	Osteoderms, sacrum & vertebra (TL-05-14).	An ankylosaurid.	
Nodosauridae genus & species indeterminate	Indeterminate	West Texas	Middle Abajo Shale	Isolated & associated osteoderms.	Very similar to osteoderms of Invictarx.	
Panoplosaurus	P. mirus	Texas	Lower Alto Shale	Osteoderm (TMM 45605-4).	A nodosaurid.	

==== Theropods ====
Indeterminate ornithomimid remains are known from the Upper Aguja Formation. Indeterminate tyrannosaurid fossils are known from the Upper Aguja Formation of Texas and Mexico.

Theropods of the Aguja Formation
Genus	Species	Location	Member	Material	Notes	Images
Avialae incertae sedis		West Texas	Middle Abajo Shale	4 teeth (TMM 45947-349, 350, 351).	A bird.	
Chirostenotes	C. sp.	Texas		Femur & manual ungual.	A caenagnathid	
Dromaeosauridae genus & species indeterminate	Indeterminate	West Texas	Middle Abajo Shale	Pedal phalanges (TMM 45909-2, TMM 44066-4).	A dromaeosaur.	
cf. Dromaeosaurus	Indeterminate	Texas				
Leptorhynchos	L. gaddisi	Texas	Lower Alto Shale	Dentaries, caudal vertebra & limb elements.	A caenagnathid	
Ornithomimidae	New genus & species	West Texas	Middle Abajo Shale	Vertebrae, ischium & limb elements.	An unnamed species referred to informally as the 'Aguja ornithomimid'.	
cf. Paronychodon		West Texas	Middle Abajo Shale	2 incomplete teeth (TMM 45947-362).	A maniraptoran.	
Richardoestesia	R. cf. gilmorei	Texas	Low Upper Shale	Fragment of a small tooth.	A coelurosaur.	
Richardoestesia	R. isosceles	Big Bend National Park, Texas	Low Upper Shale	Teeth.	A coelurosaur.	
Saurornitholestes	S. cf. langstoni	Texas	Lower Alto Shale & Middle Abajo Shale	Teeth.	A dromaeosaur.	
Saurornitholestinae	Inderteminate	Coahuila		Teeth and Teeth fragment	A dromaeosaur.	
Theropoda incertae sedis	Morphotype A	West Texas	Alto Shale	8 teeth.	Unserrated, recurved teeth.	
Theropoda incertae sedis	Morphotype B	West Texas	Alto Shale	5 tooth crowns.	Bi-serrated teeth.	
Theropoda incertae sedis	Morphotype C	West Texas	Alto Shale	7 teeth.	Finely serrated, distal plication only.	
Theropoda incertae sedis	Morphotype D	West Texas	Alto Shale	5 teeth.	Short, coarsely serrated distal plication.	
Theropoda incertae sedis	Morphotype E	West Texas	Alto Shale	A tooth.	Strongly recurved, serrated distal plication.	
Theropoda incertae sedis	Morphotype F	West Texas	Alto Shale	2 tooth fragments.	Medium size, finely serrated plications.	
cf. Troodon	Indeterminate	Texas				
Tyrannosauridae	Indeterminate	West Texas	Lower Alto Shale & Middle Abajo Shale	Isolated teeth & a handful of non-dental specimens.	Postcranial remains suggest a relatively small & gracile tyrannosaurid, considered a member of the Teratophoneini	

==== Crocodylomorphs ====
Crocodylomorphs of the Aguja Formation
Genus	Species	Location	Member	Material	Notes	Images
Crocodilia	Indeterminate	Ten Bits Ranch, west Texas.	Rattlesnake Mountain sandstone member.	Teeth.	A crocodilian.	
Deinosuchus	D. riograndensis	Texas, Chihuahua, and Coahuila	Upper Shale	Multiple partial skulls & skeletons accounting for nearly the entire skeleton minus the tail.	A giant alligatoroid.	
Deinosuchus	cf. D. sp.	West Texas	Middle Abajo Shale	Cervical osteoderm (TMM 44068-2).	An alligatoroid.	
Goniopholididae	New genus & species	West Texas	Middle Abajo Shale	Partial skull & skeleton along with isolated osteoderms & teeth.	May pertain to Denazinosuchus or a related taxon.	
Phobosuchus	P. riograndensis	Texas, Chihuahua, and Coahuila			Reclassified as a Deinosuchus species	

==== Turtles ====
Testudines of the Aguja Formation
Genus	Species	Location	Member	Material	Notes	Images
Adocus	A. sp.	Big Bend National Park, Texas.	Upper Shale	Shell fragments.	An adocid.	
cf. Aspideretoides		Big Bend National Park, Texas	Upper Shale		A softshell turtle	
Baenidae		Big Bend National Park, Texas.	Upper Shale	Shell fragments.	2 morphotypes present (A & B).	
Basilemys	B. sp.	Big Bend National Park, Texas.	Upper Shale & Lower Shale	Shell fragments, partial plastron & leg scutes.	A nanhsiungchelyid.	
Bothremydidae genus & species indeterminate	Indeterminate	West Texas	Lower Shale	Isolated peripheral bones (TMM 44068-1, 42452-8); costal bones (TMM 44064-6).	A bothremydid, compatible with Chupacabrachelys.	
Chupacabrachelys	C. complexus	Big Bend, Texas.	Base of the Upper Shale	A complete skull, and a nearly complete skeleton.	A bothremydid.	
Denazinemys	D. nodosa	West Texas	Lower Shale	Shell elements.	A baenid.	
cf. Helopanoplia		Big Bend National Park, Texas.	Upper Shale	Shell fragments.	A softshell turtle.	
cf. Hoplochelys		Big Bend National Park, Texas.	Upper Shale	Shell fragments.	A kinosternoid.	
Neurankylus	N. baueri	West Texas	Lower Shale		A baenid	
Terlinguachelys	T. fischbecki	Big Bend National Park, Texas	Rattlesnake Mountain Sandstone	A large, incomplete specimen.	A protostegid.	
Thescelus	T. rapiens	West Texas	Lower Shale		A baenid	
Testudines indeterminate	Morphotype 1	Ten Bits Ranch, west Texas.	Rattlesnake Mountain sandstone member.	A shell fragment.		
Testudines indeterminate	Morphotype 2	Ten Bits Ranch, west Texas.	Rattlesnake Mountain sandstone member.	A shell fragment.		
Testudines indeterminate	Morphotype 3	Ten Bits Ranch, west Texas.	Rattlesnake Mountain sandstone member.	A shell fragment.		
Testudines indeterminate	Morphotype 4	Ten Bits Ranch, west Texas.	Rattlesnake Mountain sandstone member.	A shell fragment.		
Trionychidae	Gen. et. sp. indet.	Big Bend National Park, Texas.	Upper Shale & Lower Shale	Costal bone (TMM 44068-4) & shell fragments.	A softshell turtle.	

==== Lepidosaurs ====
Lepidosaurs of the Aguja Formation
Genus	Species	Location	Member	Material	Notes	Images
Anguidae	Gen. et. sp. indet.	Texas.		Isolated osteoderms & partial right frontal.	An anguid.	
Apsgnathus	A. triptodon	Brewster County, Texas.		Jaw elements.	A scincomorph.	
Catactegenys	C. solaster	Brewster County, Texas.		Jaw elements & teeth.	A night lizard.	
Dryadissector	D. shilleri	West Texas.	Middle Abajo Shale	Numerous isolated teeth.	A varanoid.	
Mosasauridae	Indeterminate	Ten Bits Ranch.	Rattlesnake Mountain sandstone member.	1 partial vertebra.	A mosasaur.	
Odaxosaurus	O. piger	Brewster County, Texas.		Jaw elements.	An anguid.	
cf. Parasaniwa	cf. P. wyomingensis	Texas.		Jaw fragments.	A platynotan.	
Platynota	Gen. et. sp. indet.	Texas.		Dorsal vertebra (TMM 43057-332).	A platynotan.	
?Scincidae	Gen. et. sp. indet.	Brewster County, Texas.		Jaw elements.	A possible skink.	
cf. Scincomorpha	Gen. et. sp. indet.	Brewster County, Texas.		Jaw elements.	A scincomorph.	
Serpentes	Gen. et. sp. indet.	Texas.		Partial left dentary & right maxilla.	A snake.	
cf. Xenosauridae		Texas.		Osteoderms & maxillae.	A knob-scaled lizard.	

=== Mammals ===
Mammals of the Aguja Formation
Genus	Species	Location	Member	Material	Notes	Images
Alphadon	A. perexiguus	Brewster County, Texas	Upper Shale		A metatherian.	
Paleomolops	P. langstoni	Brewster County, Texas	Upper Shale		A tribosphenidan; "cannot be confidently allied with either marsupials or eutherians".	

=== Bony fish ===
A diversity of bony fish, comprising both marine (Ten Bits/Rattlesnake Mountain locality) and freshwater (Lowerverse/Lower Shale locality) taxa, is known. Approximately 75 whole and broken fragments of coprolites are known from the Rattlesnake Mountain sandstone member, presumably from bony fish.

Bony fish of the Aguja Formation
Genus	Species	Location	Member	Material	Notes	Images
Acanthomorpha indet.	family indet. genus et sp. indet.	Lowerverse, west Texas	Lower Shale	Vertebral centra.	An acanthomorph.	
Acanthopterygii indet.	order indet. family indet. genus et sp. indet.	Lowerverse, west Texas	Lower Shale	Vertebral centra.	An acanthopterygian.	
Acanthopterygii indet.	Acanthopterygian fin spine morph 1	Lowerverse, west Texas	Lower Shale	Fin spines	An acanthopterygian.	
Acanthopterygii indet.	Acanthopterygian fin spine morph 2	Lowerverse, west Texas	Lower Shale	Fin spines	An acanthopterygian.	
Acanthopterygii indet.	Acanthopterygian fin spine morph 3	Lowerverse, west Texas	Lower Shale	Fin spines	An acanthopterygian.	
Acanthopterygii indet.	Acanthopterygian fin spine morph 4	Lowerverse, west Texas	Lower Shale	Fin spines	An acanthopterygian.	
Acanthopterygii indet.	Euacanthopterygian fin spine morph 1	Lowerverse, west Texas	Lower Shale	Fin spines	An acanthopterygian.	
Acanthopterygii indet.	Euacanthopterygian fin spine morph 2	Lowerverse, west Texas	Lower Shale	Fin spines	An acanthopterygian.	
Acronichthys	A. sp.	Lowerverse, west Texas	Lower Shale	Vertebral centra.	An otophysan. Previously considered Ostariophysi indet.	
Albula	A. sp.	Ten Bits Ranch, west Texas.	Rattlesnake Mountain sandstone member.	Over 390 complete and fragmentary teeth.	A bonefish.	
Albula	A. sp.	Lowerverse, west Texas	Lower Shale	Over 390 complete and fragmentary teeth.	A bonefish.	
Amiidae indet.	genus et sp. indet.	Lowerverse, west Texas	Lower Shale	Vertebral centra.	An amiid.	
?Anomoeodus	?A. sp.	Lowerverse, west Texas	Lower Shale	Isolated tooth crown	A pycnodont. Likely transported out of a marine habitat.	
Atractosteus	A. sp.	Lowerverse, west Texas	Lower Shale	Teeth, jaw fragments, vertebral centra, scales.	A gar.	
Clupeiformes indet.	family indet. genus et sp. indet.	Lowerverse, west Texas	Lower Shale	Vertebral centra.	A clupeiform.	
cf. Cyclurus	cf. C. sp.	Lowerverse, west Texas	Lower Shale	5 fragmentary tooth plates with teeth.	An amiid.	
Ellimmichthyiformes indet.	family indet. genus et sp. indet.	Lowerverse, west Texas	Lower Shale	Vertebral centra.	An ellimmichthyiform.	
Elopiformes indet.	family indet. genus et sp. indet.	Lowerverse, west Texas	Lower Shale	Vertebral centra	An elopiform.	
?Enchodus	?E. sp.	Ten Bits ranch, west Texas.	Rattlesnake Mountain sandstone member.	2 abraded teeth.	An aulopiform.	
?Enchodus	?E. sp.	Lowerverse, west Texas	Lower Shale	4 isolated teeth.	An aulopiform.	
Eotexachara	E. malateres	Lowerverse, west Texas	Lower Shale	Dentaries.	A characiform.	
?Gonorynchiformes indet.	family indet. genus et sp. indet.	Lowerverse, west Texas	Lower Shale	Cranial bone, vertebral centrum, basibranchial.	A gonorynchiform.	
Hiodontidae indet.	genus et sp. indet.	Lowerverse, west Texas	Lower Shale	Vertebral centra.	A hiodontiform.	
Lepidotes	?L. sp.	Ten Bits Ranch, west Texas.	Rattlesnake Mountain sandstone member.	Approximately 109 complete and fragmentary teeth.	A lepidotid.	
cf. Melvius	cf. M. sp.	Lowerverse, west Texas	Lower Shale	Vertebrae, 13 isolated teeth.	An amiid.	
Micropycnodon	M. sp.	Lowerverse, west Texas	Lower Shale	4 isolated teeth	A pycnodont. Likely transported out of a marine habitat.	
Osteichthyes indet.	Indeterminate species A	Ten Bits Ranch, west Texas.	Rattlesnake Mountain sandstone member.	11 complete teeth.	A bony fish.	
Osteichthyes indet.	Indeterminate species B	Ten Bits Ranch, west Texas.	Rattlesnake Mountain sandstone member.	8 complete and fragmentary teeth.	A bony fish.	
Osteichthyes indet.	Indeterminate species C	Ten Bits Ranch, west Texas.	Rattlesnake Mountain sandstone member.	1 complete tooth.	A bony fish.	
Osteichthyes indet.	Indeterminate species D	Ten Bits Ranch, west Texas.	Rattlesnake Mountain sandstone member.	1 complete and 1 partial tooth.	A bony fish.	
Osteichthyes indet.	Indeterminate	Ten Bits Ranch, west Texas.	Rattlesnake Mountain sandstone member.	Approximately 475 complete and fragmentary teleost centra.	A bony fish.	
Osteichthyes indet.	Tooth morph 1	Lowerverse, west Texas	Lower Shale	Teeth	A bony fish.	
Osteichthyes indet.	Tooth morph 2	Lowerverse, west Texas	Lower Shale	Teeth	A bony fish.	
Osteichthyes indet.	Centrum morph 1	Lowerverse, west Texas	Lower Shale	Vertebral centra.	A bony fish.	
Osteichthyes indet.	Centrum morph 2	Lowerverse, west Texas	Lower Shale	Vertebral centra.	A bony fish.	
Osteichthyes indet.	Centrum morph 3	Lowerverse, west Texas	Lower Shale	Vertebral centra.	A bony fish.	
Osteichthyes indet.	Centrum morph 4	Lowerverse, west Texas	Lower Shale	Vertebral centra.	A bony fish.	
Paralbula	P. cf. casei	Ten Bits Ranch, west Texas.	Rattlesnake Mountain sandstone member.	Approximately 900 complete and fragmentary teeth and tooth caps.	A bonefish. Lowerverse specimens likely transported out of a marine habitat.	
Paralbula	P. cf. casei	Lowerverse, west Texas	Lower Shale	Approximately 900 complete and fragmentary teeth and tooth caps.	A bonefish. Lowerverse specimens likely transported out of a marine habitat.	
Primuluchara	P. laramidensis	Lowerverse, west Texas	Lower Shale	Dentaries.	A characiform.	
Stephanodus	?S. sp.	Ten Bits Ranch, west Texas.	Rattlesnake Mountain sandstone member.	21 whole and fragmentary specimens.	A pycnodont.	
?Wilsonichthys	?W. sp.	Lowerverse, west Texas	Lower Shale	Vertebral centra.	An osteoglossiform.	

=== Cartilaginous fish ===
Cartilaginous fish of the Aguja Formation
Genus	Species	Location	Member	Material	Notes	Images
Brachyrhyzodus	B. wichitaensis	Ten Bits Ranch, west Texas.	Rattlesnake Mountain sandstone member.	11 complete teeth.		
Cantioscyllium	C. aff. meyeri	Ten Bits Ranch, west Texas.	Rattlesnake Mountain sandstone member.	1 anterior tooth and 5 lateral teeth.	A nurse shark.	
Chiloscyllium	C. aff. greeni	Ten Bits Ranch, west Texas.	Rattlesnake Mountain sandstone member.	Approximately 90 abraded and fragmentary teeth.	A bamboo shark.	
Chondrichthyes		Ten Bits Ranch, west Texas.	Rattlesnake Mountain sandstone member.	23 placoid scales and 69 dermal scales.	4 morphotypes of placoid scales (A to D) present.	
Columbusia	C. sp.	Ten Bits Ranch, west Texas.	Rattlesnake Mountain sandstone member.	20 complete & fragmentary teeth.	A wobbegong.	
Cretalamna	C. appendiculata	Ten Bits Ranch, west Texas.	Rattlesnake Mountain sandstone member.	3 fragmentary teeth.	Reassigned to C. cf. C. sarcoportheta.	
Cretalamna	C. cf. C. sarcoportheta	Ten Bits Ranch, west Texas.	Rattlesnake Mountain sandstone member.	3 incomplete teeth & fragments of additional teeth.	Originally reported as C. appendiculata.	
Cretorectolobus	C. olsoni	Ten Bits Ranch, west Texas.	Rattlesnake Mountain sandstone member.	"20 complete and fragmentary teeth".	A carpet shark.	
Hybodontidae genus & species indeterminate	Indeterminate	West Texas	Lower Shale	Fragment of a dorsal fin spine (TMM 42536-10).	A hybodont.	
Hybodus	H. sp.	Ten Bits Ranch.	Rattlesnake Mountain sandstone member.	2 specimens, one complete and one partial tooth.	A hybodont.	
Igdabatis	I. indicus?	Ten Bits Ranch, west Texas.	Rattlesnake Mountain sandstone member.	A single incomplete tooth.	A myliobatid.	
Ischyrhiza	I. cf. avonicola	Ten Bits Ranch, west Texas.	Rattlesnake Mountain sandstone member.	5 complete and fragmentary rostral teeth.	A sawskate.	
Ischyrhiza	I. mira	Ten Bits Ranch, west Texas.	Rattlesnake Mountain sandstone member.	11 fragmentary rostral teeth and 230 whole and fragmentary oral teeth.	A sawskate.	
Lonchidion	L. conrugis	Ten Bits Ranch, west Texas.	Rattlesnake Mountain sandstone member.	4 complete and 5 fragmentary teeth.	A hybodont.	
Lonchidion	L. selachos	Ten Bits Ranch, west Texas.	Rattlesnake Mountain sandstone member.	4 complete and 5 fragmentary teeth.	A hybodont.	
Meristodon	M. sp.	Ten Bits Ranch, west Texas.	Rattlesnake Mountain sandstone member.	2 teeth.	A hybodont.	
Myliobatiformes	Incertae sedis	Ten Bits Ranch, west Texas.	Rattlesnake Mountain sandstone member.	3 complete specimens.		
Protoplatyrhina	P. renae	Ten Bits Ranch, west Texas.	Rattlesnake Mountain sandstone member.	70 complete and fragmentary teeth.	A hypsobatid.	
Ptychotrygon	P. agujaensis	Ten Bits Ranch, west Texas.	Rattlesnake Mountain sandstone member.	Over 690 complete and fragmentary teeth.	A sawskate.	
Ptychotrygon	P. triangularis	Ten Bits Ranch, west Texas.	Rattlesnake Mountain sandstone member.	Over 170 complete and fragmentary teeth.	A sawskate.	
Ptychotrygon	P. aff. cuspidata	Ten Bits Ranch, west Texas.	Rattlesnake Mountain sandstone member.	7 whole and fragmentary teeth.	A sawskate.	
Ptychotrygon	P. sp.	Ten Bits Ranch, west Texas.	Rattlesnake Mountain sandstone member.	One complete tooth (TMM 46018-71).	A sawskate.	
Restesia	R. corricki	Ten Bits Ranch, west Texas.	Rattlesnake Mountain sandstone member.	4 complete and 5 fragmentary teeth.	A carpet shark.	
Rhinobatos	R. casieri	Ten Bits Ranch, west Texas.	Rattlesnake Mountain sandstone member.	"14 complete and fragmentary specimens".	A guitarfish.	
Rhinobatos	R. sp.	Ten Bits Ranch, west Texas.	Rattlesnake Mountain sandstone member.	18 complete & fragmentary specimens.	A guitarfish.	
Rhombodus	R. levis	Ten Bits Ranch, west Texas.	Rattlesnake Mountain sandstone member.	Over 22 complete and fragmentary teeth.	A rajiforme.	
Scapanorhynchus	S. texanus	Ten Bits Ranch, west Texas.	Rattlesnake Mountain sandstone member.	Over 800 complete and fragmentary teeth.	A mitsukurinid.	
Sclerorhynchidae	Morphotype 1	Ten Bits Ranch, west Texas.	Rattlesnake Mountain sandstone member.	One fragmentary rostral spine (TMM 46018-59).	A sawskate.	
Sclerorhynchidae	Morphotype 2	Ten Bits Ranch, west Texas.	Rattlesnake Mountain sandstone member.	One fragmentary rostral spine (TMM 46018-60).	A sawskate.	
Sclerorhynchidae	Morphotype 3	Ten Bits Ranch, west Texas.	Rattlesnake Mountain sandstone member.	3 fragmentary rostral teeth.	A sawskate.	
Sclerorhynchidae	Morphotype 4	Ten Bits Ranch, west Texas.	Rattlesnake Mountain sandstone member.	27 fragmentary rostral spines.	A sawskate.	
Serratolamna	S. cf. S. caraibaea	Ten Bits Ranch, west Texas.	Rattlesnake Mountain sandstone member.	About 34 teeth.	A mackerel shark.	
Squalicorax	S. kaupi	Ten Bits Ranch, west Texas.	Rattlesnake Mountain sandstone member.	"26 complete and fragmentary anterior and lateral teeth".	An anacoracid.	
Squalicorax	S. aff. S. lindstromi	Ten Bits Ranch, west Texas.	Rattlesnake Mountain sandstone member.	4 specimens.	An anacoracid.	
Squalicorax	S. pristodontus	Ten Bits Ranch, west Texas.	Rattlesnake Mountain sandstone member.	2 specimens.	An anacoracid.	
Squalicorax	S. aff. S. yangaensis	Ten Bits Ranch, west Texas.	Rattlesnake Mountain sandstone member.	4 complete & several fragmentary teeth.	An anacoracid.	
Squatina	S. hassei	Ten Bits Ranch, west Texas.	Rattlesnake Mountain sandstone member.	A single complete specimen.	An angelshark.	
Squatina	S. sp.	Ten Bits Ranch, west Texas.	Rattlesnake Mountain sandstone member.	A complete tooth & 2 fragmentary teeth.	An angelshark.	
Texatrygon	T. cf. T. copei	Ten Bits Ranch, west Texas.	Rattlesnake Mountain sandstone member.	4 complete & fragmentary teeth.	A sawskate formerly reported as T. hooveri.	
Texatrygon	T. hooveri	Ten Bits Ranch, west Texas.	Rattlesnake Mountain sandstone member.	4 complete and fragmentary specimens.	Reassigned to T. cf. T. copei.	

=== Invertebrates ===
==== Ammonites ====
Ammonites of the Aguja Formation
Genus	Species	Location	Member	Abundance	Notes	Images
Baculites	B. mclearni		Rattlesnake Mountain Sandstone; Terlingua Creek Sandstone			
Hoplitoplacenticeras	H. plasticum		Rattlesnake Mountain Sandstone			
Pachydiscus	P. paulsoni		Rattlesnake Mountain Sandstone			

=== Plants ===
Plants of the Aguja Formation
Genus	Species	Location	Member	Material	Notes	Images
Sabal	S. bigbendense	Big Bend National Park, Texas.	Upper Shale	4 seeds.	A palm. It has the largest seeds of any fossil Sabal.	
Sabal	S. bracknellense	Big Bend National Park, Texas.	Upper Shale	5 seeds.	A palm. The seeds are indistinguishable from those of Eocene S. bracknellense, and so were assigned to that species. However, it is likely these Aguja palms would be found to represent distinct species if other parts of the plants were available for comparison.	

Color key: Taxon / Reclassified taxon / Taxon falsely reported as present / Dubious taxon or junior synonym / Ichnotaxon / Ootaxon / Morphotaxon

Notes
Uncertain or tentative taxa are in small text
~~crossed out~~ taxa are discredited.

== See also ==
- List of dinosaur-bearing rock formations
