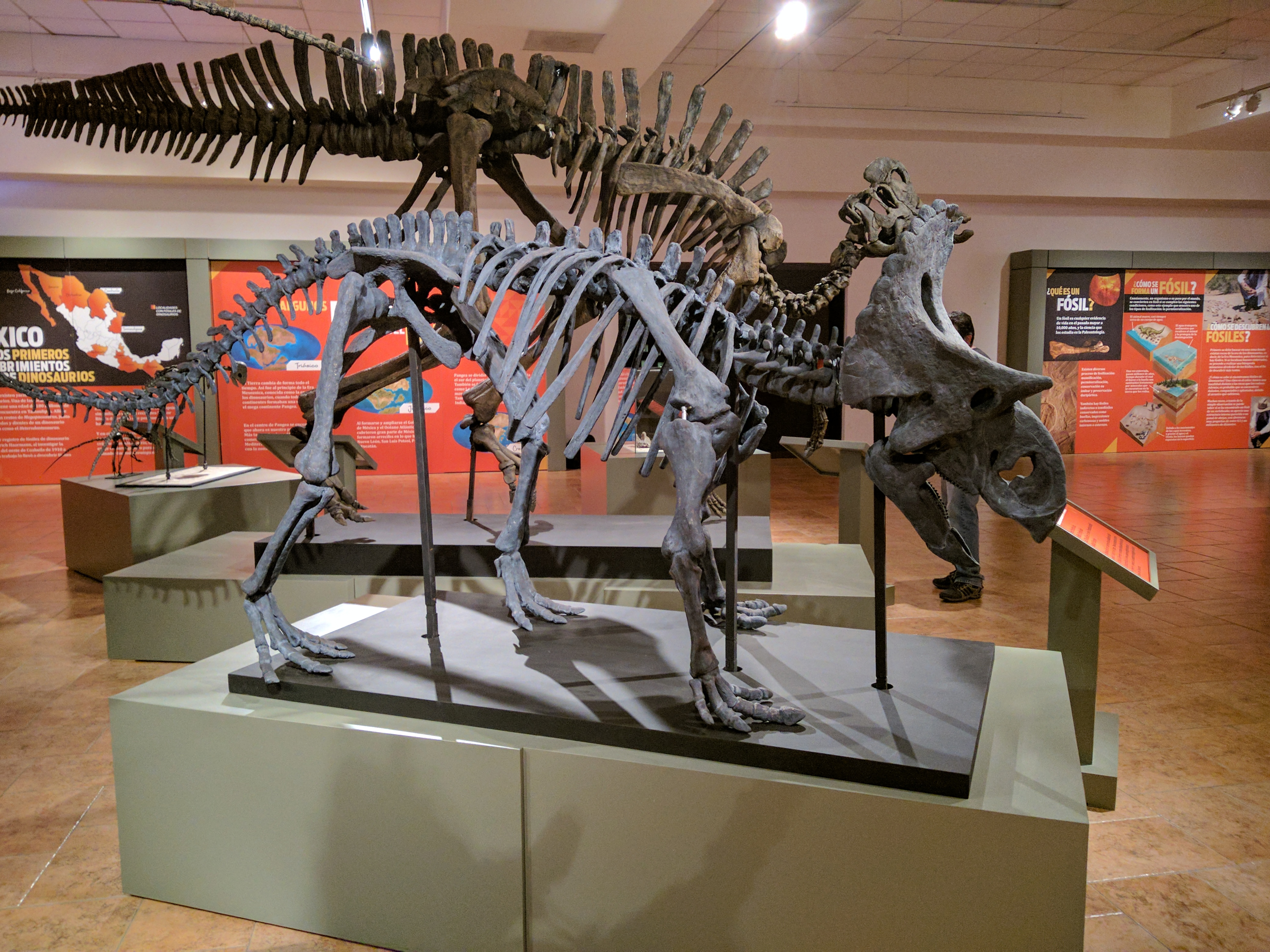
- Reconstructed skeleton mount at the Museum of the Desert, Saltillo, Coahuila, Mexico

Scientific classification
- Kingdom: Animalia
- Phylum: Chordata
- Class: Reptilia
- Clade: Dinosauria
- Clade: †Ornithischia
- Clade: †Ceratopsia
- Family: †Ceratopsidae
- Subfamily: †Centrosaurinae
- Tribe: †Nasutoceratopsini
- Genus: †Yehuecauhceratops; Rivera-Sylva et al., 2017
- Species: †Y. mudei

Binomial name
- †Yehuecauhceratops mudei Rivera-Sylva et al., 2017

= Yehuecauhceratops =

Yehuecauhceratops Temporal range: Campanian, 72 Ma

Extinct genus of dinosaurs

Yehuecauhceratops (meaning "ancient horned face") is a genus of horned centrosaurine ceratopsid dinosaur from the Late Cretaceous of Coahuila, Mexico. It contains a single species, Y. mudei, described from two partial specimens by Rivera-Sylva et al. in 2016 and formally named by Rivera-Sylva et al. in 2017. It was a small centrosaurine with a body length of 3 metres (9.8 ft), making it smaller than Agujaceratops and Coahuilaceratops, the other two ceratopsids in its environment; the three may have been ecologically segregated. A ridge bearing a single roughened projection near the bottom of the squamosal bone, which probably supported a small horn, allows Yehuecauhceratops to be distinguished from other centrosaurines. Its affinities to nasutoceratopsin centrosaurines, such as Avaceratops and Nasutoceratops, are supported by various morphological similarities to the former.

== Discovery and naming ==
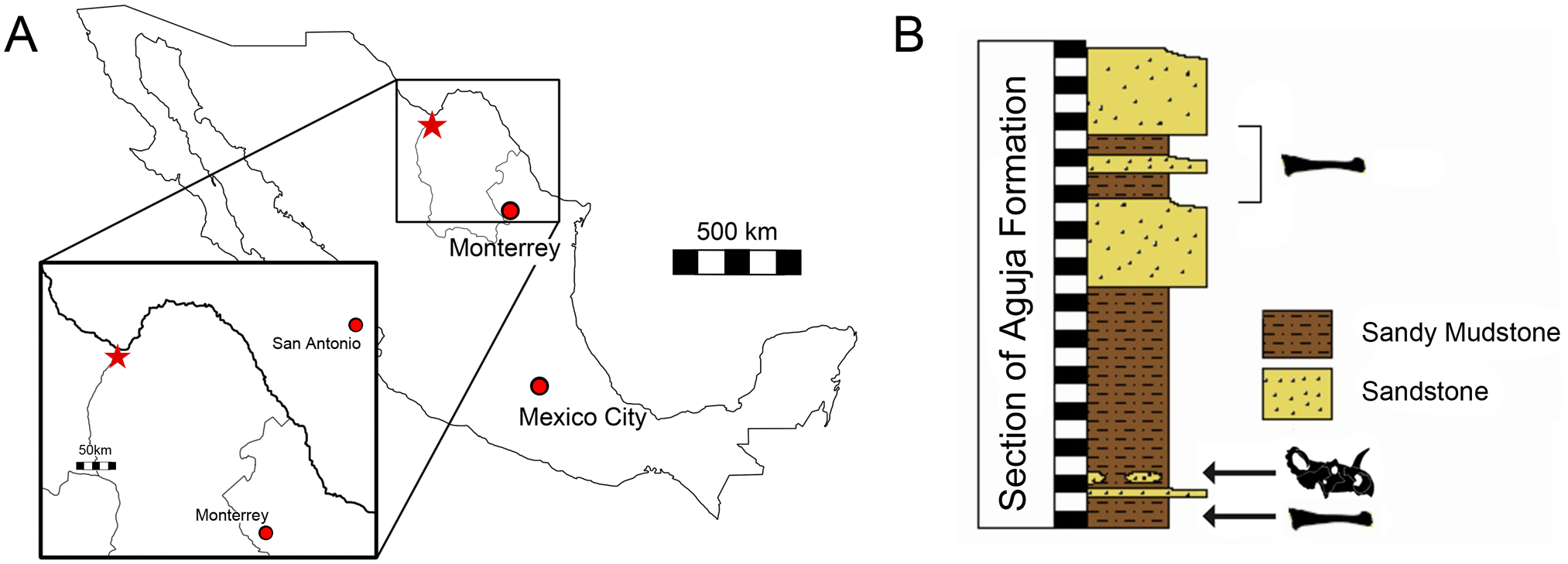
Maps showing where specimens have been found

Specimens of Yehuecauhceratops were recovered during excavations from 2007 to 2011 in a locality near the town of La Salada, in Ocampo, Coahuila, Mexico, about 23.3 kilometres (14.5 mi) south of Big Bend National Park in Texas. The rocks exposed in this locality belong to the Campanian Aguja Formation, although its precise location within the temporal range of the formation is difficult to establish. Specimens attributed to Yehuecauhceratops are stored in the palaeontological collection of the Museo del Desierto.

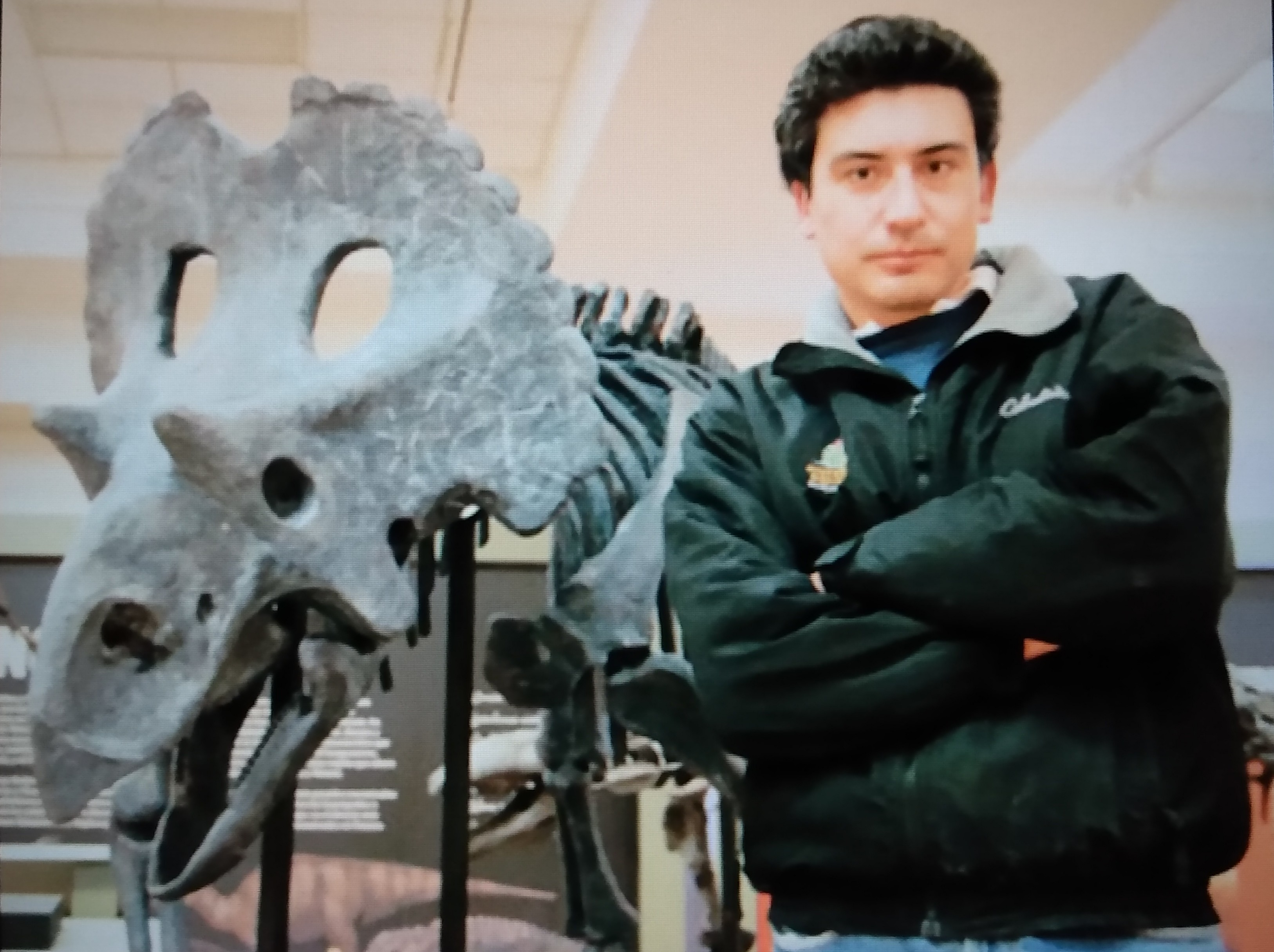
First author Héctor E. Rivera-Sylva with skeletal mount

The holotype of Yehuecauhceratops has been given the specimen number CPC 274. It consists of a nearly complete left squamosal, three fragments from the parietal, one fragment each from the premaxilla and dentary, a complete scapula and femur, the portion of the ilium in front of the acetabulum, and part of a dorsal vertebra with the neural spine broken off. Parts of the ribs, fragments of the ossified tendons that supported the tail, and miscellaneous fragments are also known. Additionally, there is a tibial fragment that is too small to belong to CPC 274; this second specimen, not referred in 2017, has been labelled with the specimen number CPC 1478.

Although these two specimens were initially described by Rivera-Sylva et al. in 2016 as an indeterminate centrosaurine, they were formally named in 2017 by Héctor Eduardo Rivera-Sylva, Eberhard Frey, Wolfgang Stinnesbeck, José Rubén Guzmán-Gutiérrez and Arturo Homero González-González, based on the diagnostic characters in the squamosal. The generic name Yehuecauhceratops, pronounced "Ye-OO-ek-au-ceratops", is derived from the Nahuatl word yehuecauh ("ancient") and the Greek suffix ceratops ("horned face"). Meanwhile, the specific name mudei references the acronym of the Museo del Desierto (MUDE).

== Description ==
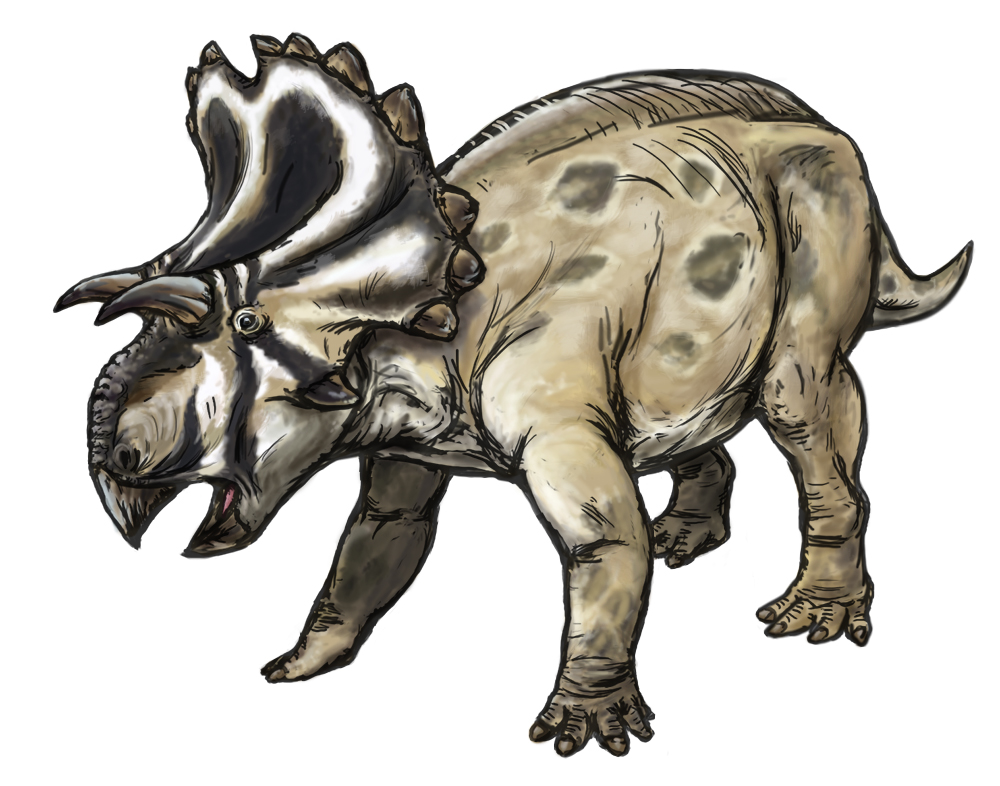
Life restoration

Yehuecauhceratops was a small ceratopsid, with a length of about 3 metres (9.8 ft). The type specimen was likely a late subadult or adult, judging by the degree of fusion in the vertebra.

=== Cranial material ===
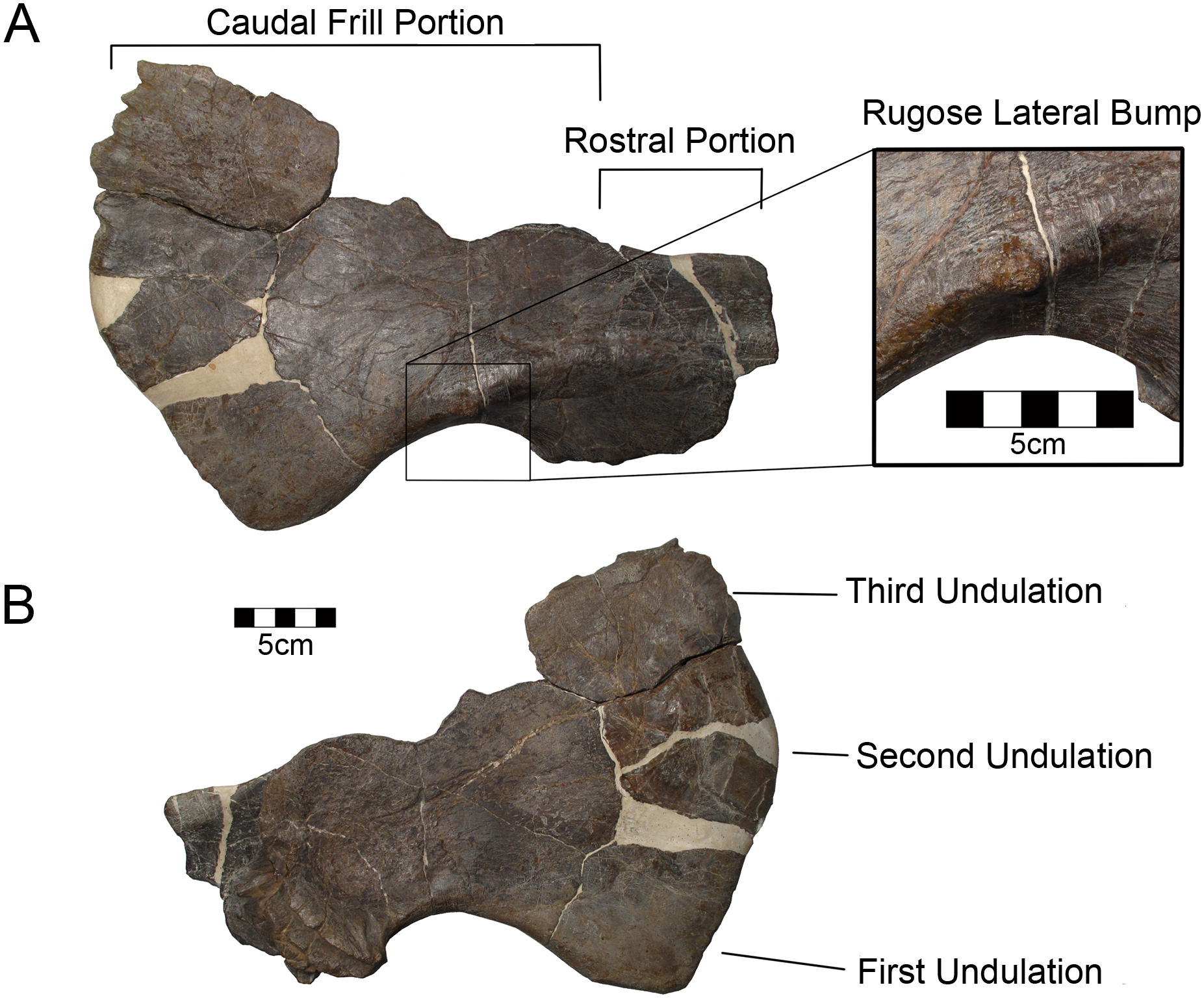
Holotype squamosal

The squamosal of Yehuecauhceratops is the only element that allows it to be confidently distinguished from other ceratopsids. It has a stepped edge on its border with the parietal, which is characteristic of all centrosaurines. Unlike more derived centrosaurines like Styracosaurus, Centrosaurus, and Pachyrhinosaurus, but more similarly to Avaceratops, the squamosal is longer than it is wide. The expanded rear portion of the squamosal is twice the length of the rest of the bone. At its top margin, the squamosal contributed to the outline of the supratemporal fenestra, the slit in the frill base.

Along the outer edge of the squamosal, there are three prominent undulations that probably supported epiossifications, although the epiossifications themselves are missing. The second undulation is deflected slightly upwards like more derived centrosaurines. In Wendiceratops and more derived centrosaurines, however, there are at least four or five undulations, instead of three. There is a ridge running across the squamosal near the bottom of the bone; it is less prominent than in Nasutoceratops, and does not extend onto the fan-like back of the bone. Unlike Avaceratops, Wendiceratops, and Albertaceratops, the three smooth protuberances along the ridge are missing; instead, there is only one roughened protuberance near the middle of the ridge, which probably supported a small horn. These two characteristics, the position of the ridge and the single protuberance, are the autapomorphies of Yehuecauhceratops, traits allowing it to be distinguished from other centrosaurines.

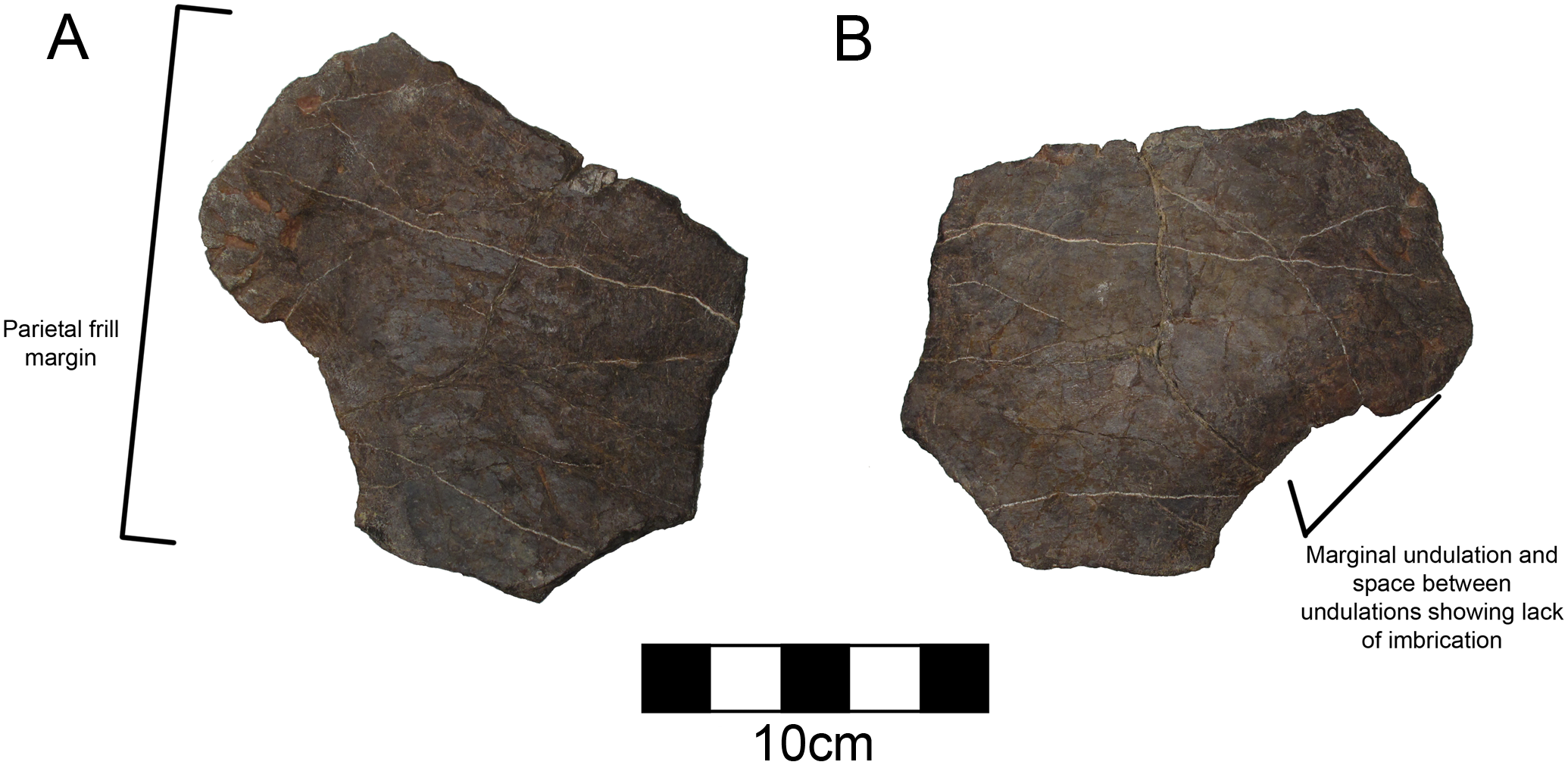
Parietal fragment

Judging by the fragments of the parietal, it was a relatively smooth bone. The largest and most thickened pieces, which originate from near the centre of the frill, suggest that Yehuecauhceratops probably had relatively small fenestrae, in contrast to most other centrosaurines but not to Avaceratops. A parietal epiossification is preserved; it has a simple, crescent-shaped edge, not unlike the squamosal undulations in terms of its shape, and its surface is roughened. Like Diabloceratops, Avaceratops, Xenoceratops, and Nasutoceratops, this epiossification is not immediately adjacent to or overlapped by another epiossification; instead, there is an inward undulation in the bone right next to the epiossification.

A portion of the premaxilla contains the edge of the nostril; a ridge extending diagonally across the bone is, like that of Diabloceratops, more prominent than that of Avaceratops. The interior surface of the bone was roughened save for the top portion surrounding the nostril, which is also the thickest part of the bone. A piece of the dentary likely comes from the rear third of the jaw, judging by the presence of the coronoid process of the mandible. It preserves a row of teeth, containing six tooth sockets with three fully erupted teeth, that was offset towards the midline of the animal from the centre of the bone.

=== Postcranial material ===
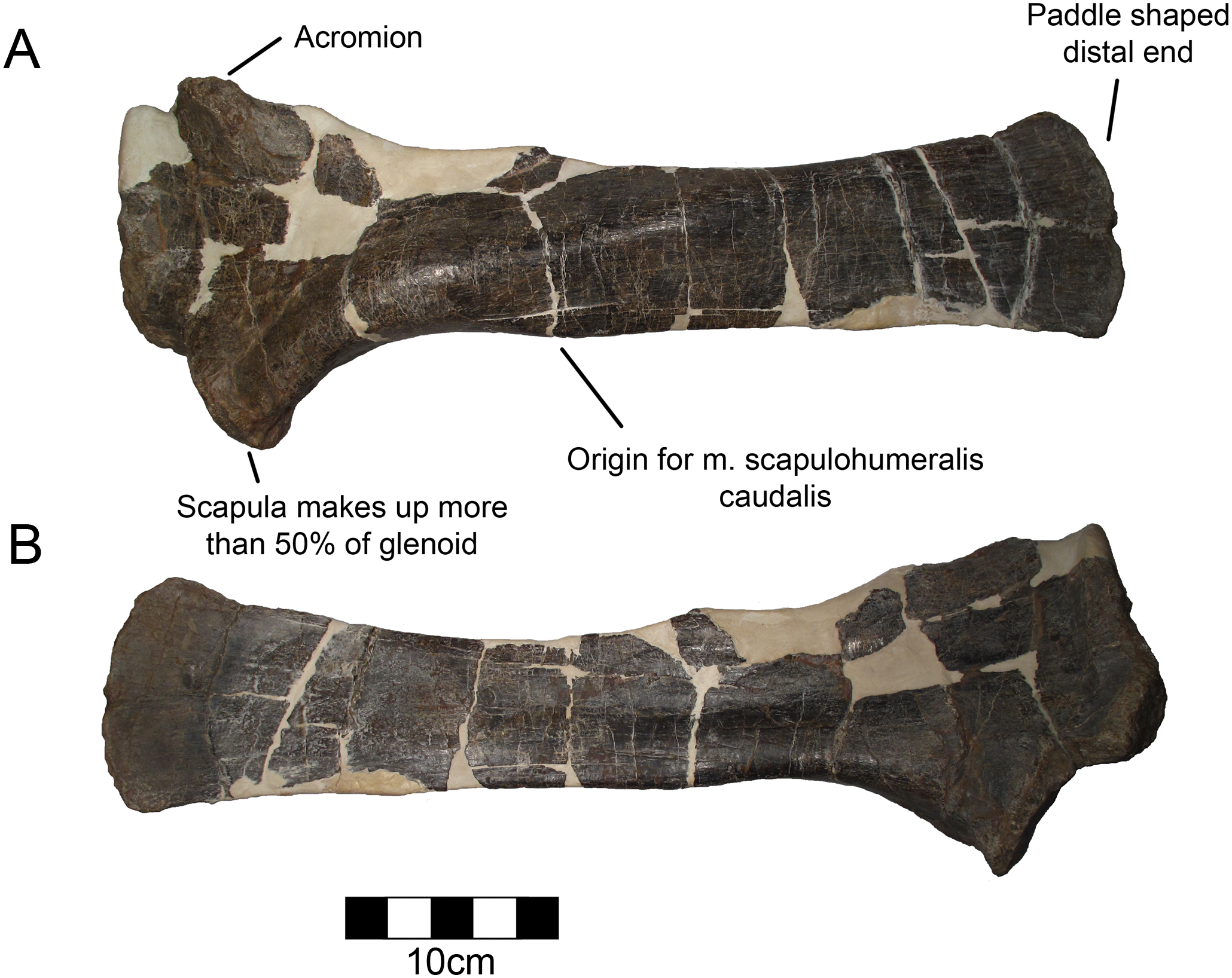
Scapula

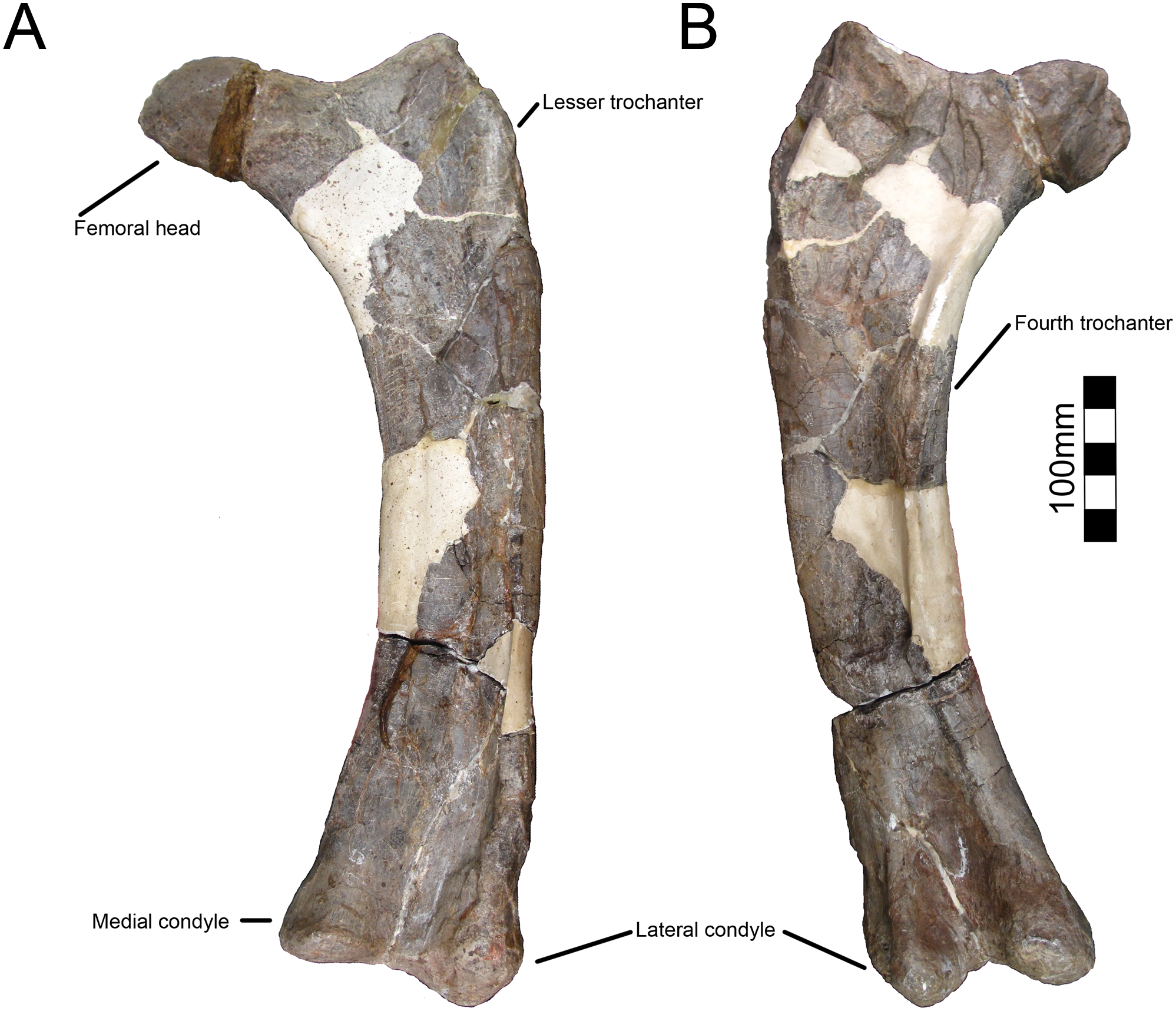
Femur

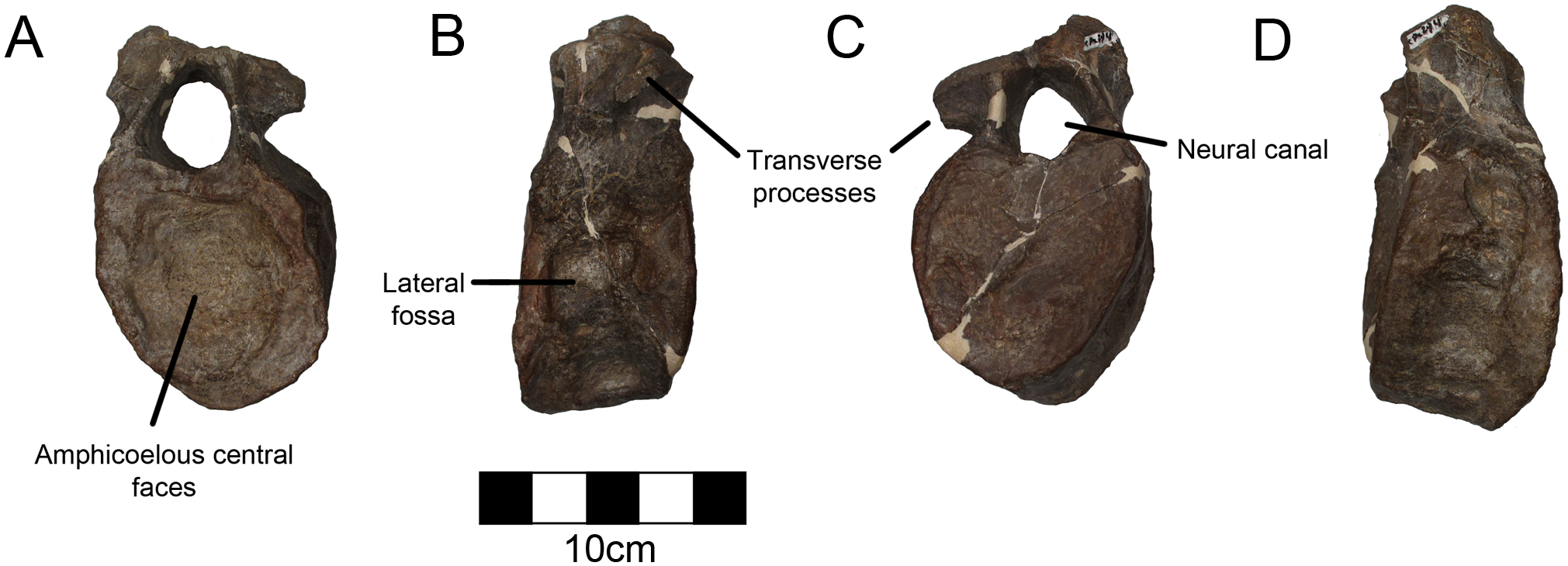
Dorsal vertebra

As is typical of centrosaurines, the scapula forms about half of the glenoid articulation. Like other ceratopsids, the acromion was prominent and very roughened. On the bottom edge of the bone, there is an abrupt angle of 25° at the thickest point in the bone instead of a gradual curve. The top end of the scapula was widened to form a paddle-like shape, more prominently so than other centrosaurines. As in other ceratopsians, the ilium was strongly deflected, with the deflected portion of the bone being straight when viewed from the top.

The robustly shafted femur is straightened and minimally curved as in Avaceratops, although part of this may be an artifact of crushing. On the femur, the femoral head is rounded and globe-shaped, the greater trochanter is separated from and rises above the level of the femoral head, and the fourth trochanter forms a prominent crest like in other centrosaurines. The cnemial crest of the tibia is expanded and is about 40% of the width of the expanded end of the bone, which is similar to Avaceratops.

A dorsal vertebra, which likely comes from near the neck-torso transition judging by the large neural canal, has slightly pinched edges, with a depression on either side at the level of the neural canal. The articular ends of the vertebra are rounded and concave on both sides (or amphicoelous). The neural canal itself was about 25% taller than it was wide. The neural arch, which encloses the neural canal, is almost entirely fused to the rest of the bone; however, a small trace of the suture is slightly visible in some places.

== Classification ==
3D scan of the squamosal (click thumbnail to turn around)

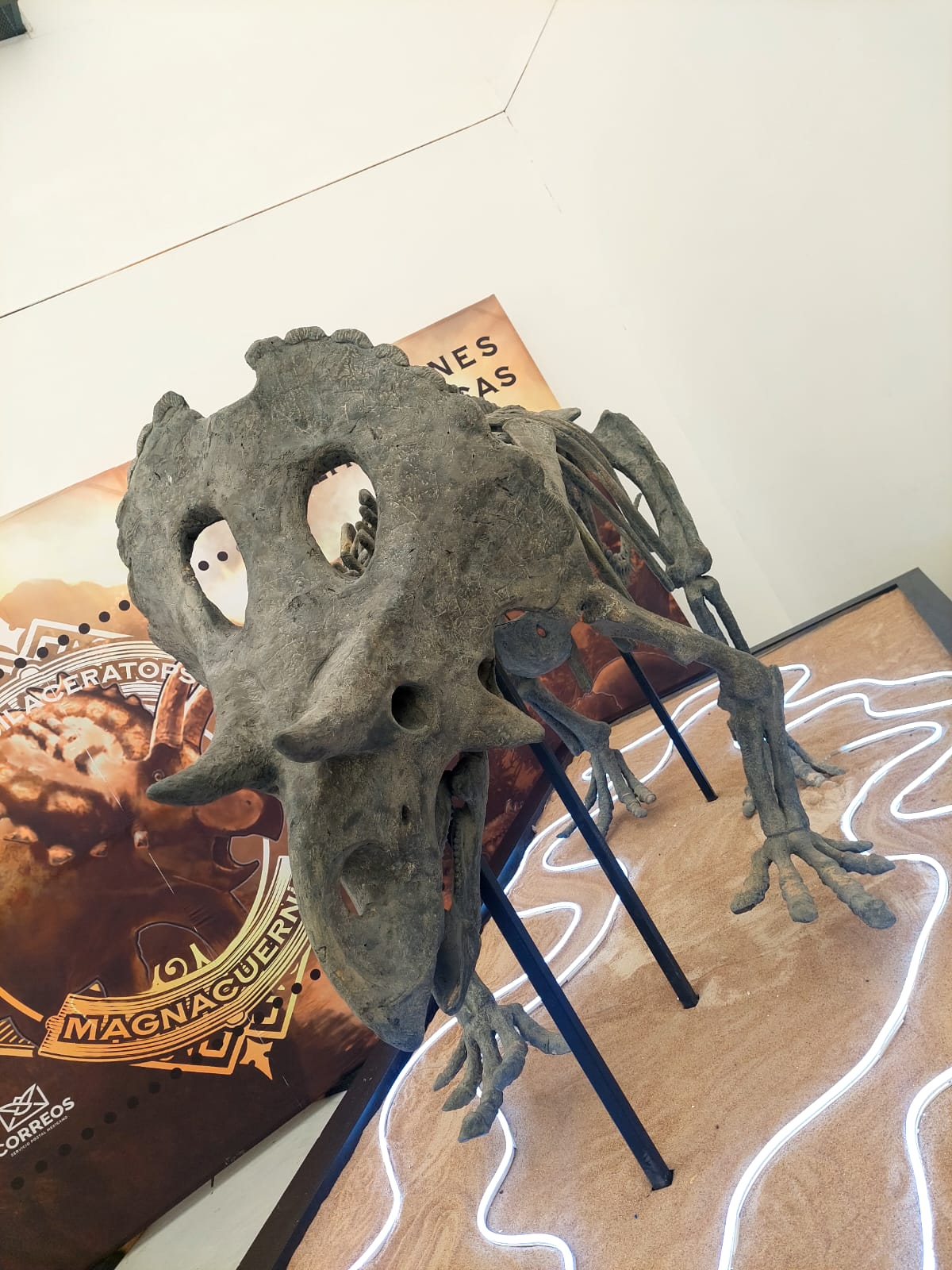
Reconstructed skeleton

A phylogenetic analysis conducted in 2016 found that Yehuecauhceratops occupied a fairly basal position in the Centrosaurinae, being in the same clade as Avaceratops and Nasutoceratops (a clade subsequently named Nasutoceratopsini). Indeed, Yehuecauhceratops and Avaceratops share a number of characters. The strict consensus of the phylogenetic trees recovered by the analysis is reproduced below.

- Centrosaurinae
  - Diabloceratops
  - - - Xenoceratops
      - - Albertaceratops nesmoi
        - - Wendiceratops
          - Sinoceratops
        - - - Rubeosaurus
            - Styracosaurus
            - Coronosaurus
            - - Centrosaurus
              - Spinops
          - - Einiosaurus
            - - Achelousaurus
              - Pachyrhinosaurus
                - Pachyrhinosaurus canadensis
                - Pachyrhinosaurus lakustai
                - Pachyrhinosaurus perotorum
    - - Yehuecauhceratops
      - Nasutoceratops
      - Avaceratops

The unique, roughened protrusion of the squamosal of Yehuecauhceratops is only otherwise seen among centrosaurines in Menefeeceratops from the much earlier Menefee Formation of New Mexico, and Crittendenceratops, from the likewise earlier Fort Crittenden Formation of Arizona. However, since these specimens are separated in time by more than one million years, it is unlikely that they belong to the same genus. Additionally, the specimen UMNH VP16704, referred to as the "Nipple Butte skull", also resembles Yehuecauhceratops and Menefeeceratops in having a fan-shaped end of the squamosal, though it lacks this singular protrusion.

== Paleoecology ==
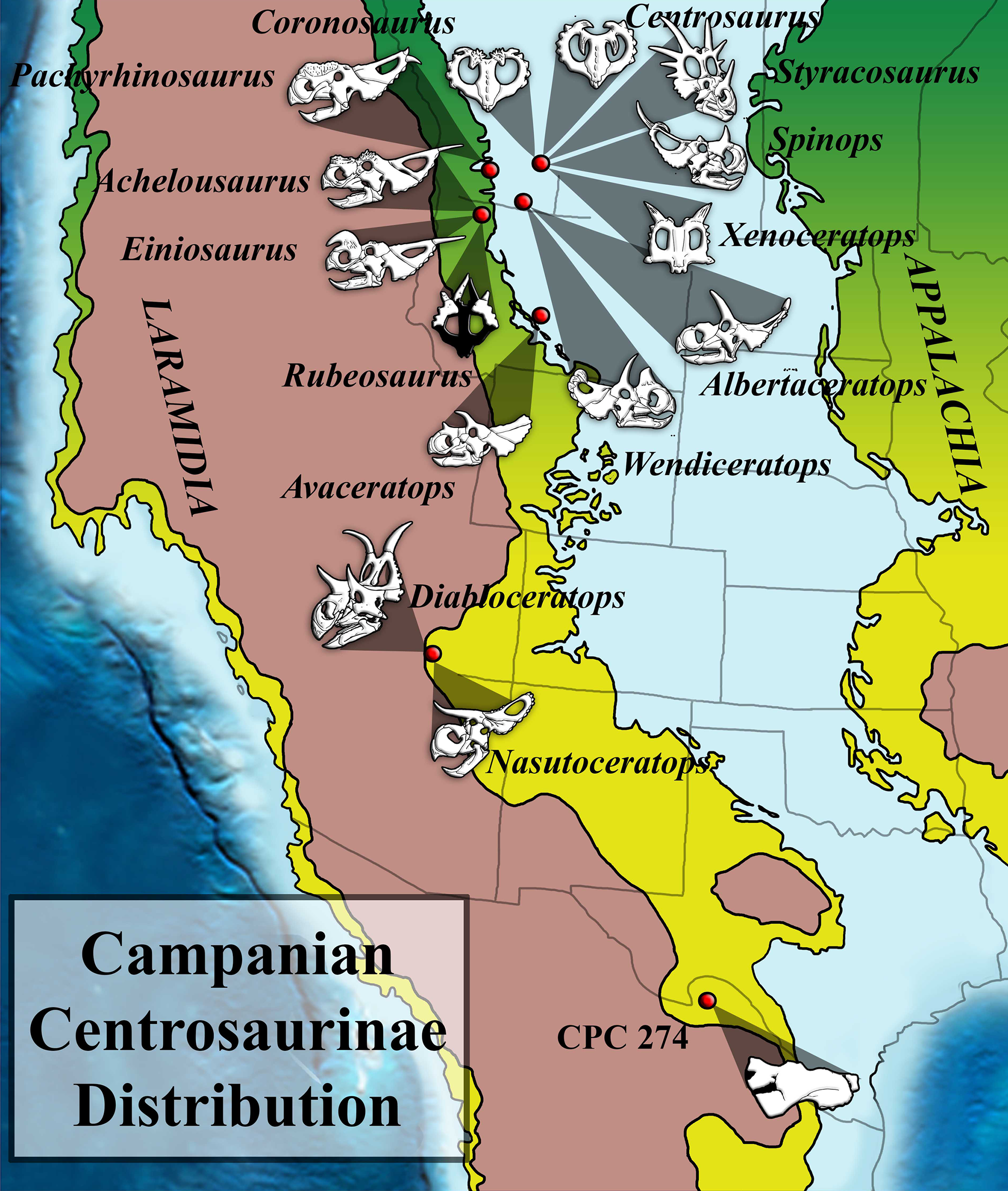
Centrosaurine remains superimposed over a map of Campanian North America; Yehuecauhceratops (CPC 274) at bottom

The environment Yehuecauhceratops lived in, corresponding to the lower part of the upper Aguja Formation, would have been a freshwater-to-brackish coastal marsh and floodplain that were part of a river delta. Sediments also record the presence of oxbow lakes and some coastal marine deposits. Although the Mexican strata of the Aguja Formation have not been solidly dated, dating of other deposits belonging to the Aguja and the contemporary Cerro del Pueblo Formations has produced date ranges that overlap around 72.5 Ma. In Mexico, the diversity of animals in the Aguja Formation is somewhat limited. Asides from Yehuecauhceratops, other discovered remains include the chasmosaurine Agujaceratops mavericus, pachycephalosaur teeth; large tibiae from hadrosaurids; crocodilian teeth; and shell fragments from baenid and trionychid turtles.

From contemporaneous deposits of the Aguja Formation in Texas, numerous dinosaurs are known; they include the chasmosaurine Agujaceratops mariscalensis, the saurolophine Kritosaurus, the pachycephalosaur Texacephale, and the tooth taxon Richardoestesia, as well as unnamed lambeosaurines, nodosaurs, tyrannosaurs, ornithomimids, caenagnathids, and dromaeosaurs. Non-dinosaurs include the giant alligatoroid Deinosuchus and a goniopholidid; the squamates Odaxosaurus, Proxestops, Restes, Estescincosaurus, and various unnamed taxa; the turtles "Baena" and "Aspideretes", as well as an additional chelonian; the amphibians Albanerpeton, a scapherpetonid, a salamander, and a frog; the mammals Cimolomys, Meniscoessus, Cimolodon, Alphadon, Turgidodon, Pediomys, Gallolestes, and others; various bony fish; and the cartilaginous fish Hybodus, Lissodus, Scapanorhynchys, Onchopristis, Ischyrhiza, Squatirhina, Ptychotrygon, and others.

Although ceratopsids are very common in Laramidian deposits north of Colorado, there are very few of them from the south, and even fewer of them actually preserve any diagnostic material. Centrosaurines, despite their limited material, appeared to have been somewhat more common in the south. However, several chasmosaurines are also known from Mexico, namely Agujaceratops mavericus and Coahuilaceratops magnacuerna (from the Cerro de Pueblo Formation). This is consistent with a likely climate-related separation of flora between the northern and southern parts of Laramidia during the Campanian. Particularly, in the Texan Aguja Formation, dicotyledons Metcalfeoxylon and Agujoxylon were predominant. In contrast, coniferous plants are more abundant in northern regions. Within the Aguja fauna, Yehuecauhceratops was relatively small compared to the giant Coahuilaceratops, with Agujaceratops in between; this suggests some level of size-based diet partitioning among the three ceratopsids.

== See also ==
- Timeline of ceratopsian research
- 2017 in archosaur paleontology
