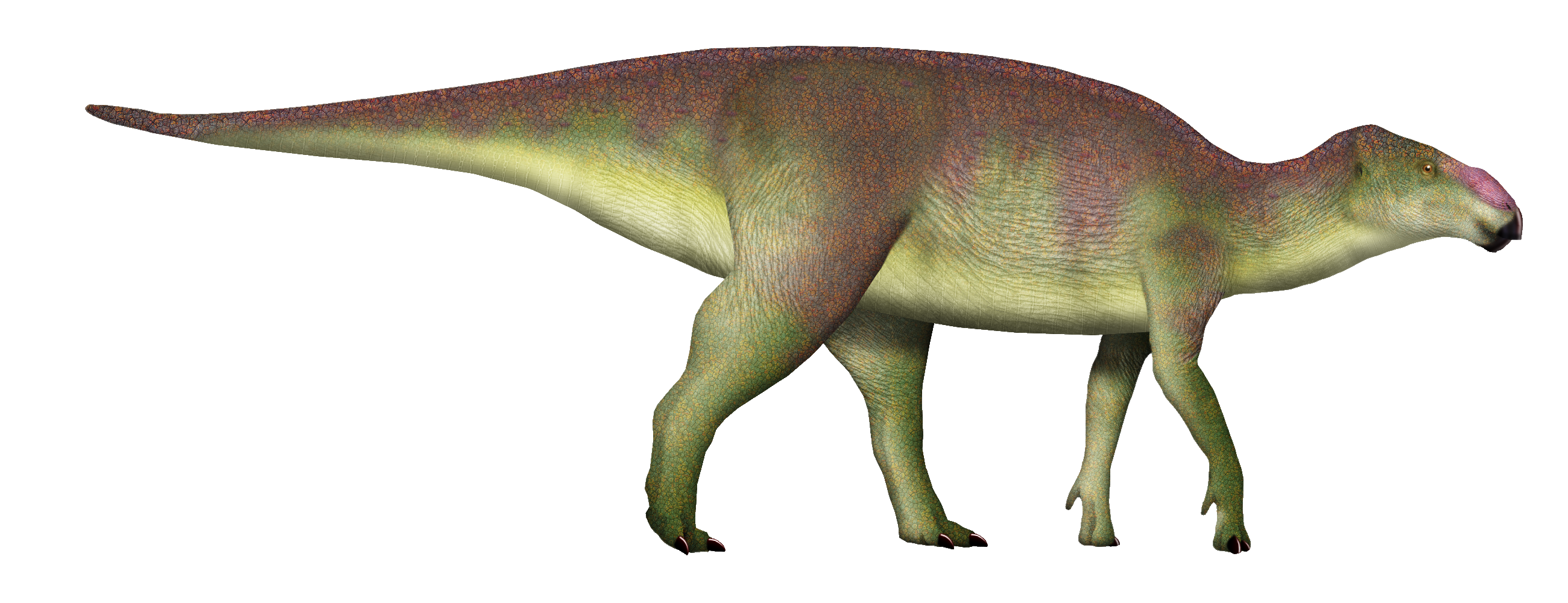
- Life restoration

Scientific classification
- Kingdom: Animalia
- Phylum: Chordata
- Class: Reptilia
- Clade: Dinosauria
- Clade: †Ornithischia
- Clade: †Ornithopoda
- Family: †Hadrosauridae
- Genus: †Malefica; Prieto-Márquez & Wagner, 2023
- Species: †M. deckerti

Binomial name
- †Malefica deckerti Prieto-Márquez & Wagner, 2023

= Malefica =

Malefica Temporal range: Late Cretaceous, Campanian ~81.5–76.9 Ma

Extinct genus of hadrosaurid dinosaur

Malefica (meaning "witch" or "sorceress") is a genus of hadrosaurid dinosaur from the Late Cretaceous (Campanian) Aguja Formation of Texas, United States. The type and only species is Malefica deckerti.

== Discovery and naming ==
The holotype of Malefica deckerti, TxVP 41917-1, is a partial left maxilla recovered from Bruja Canyon in Big Bend National Park. In 2002, it was assigned to the genus Kritosaurus, as cf. K. navajovius. Twenty years later, it was discovered to contain a number of useful diagnostic traits that allowed it to be described as a new taxon, despite being fragmentary. The generic name, "Malefica", means "witch" or "sorceress" in Latin, referring to its discovery in Bruja Canyon (bruja being Spanish for "witch"). The specific name, "deckerti", honors Frank Deckert, the specimen's discoverer and former superintendent of Big Bend National Park.

== Classification ==
Prieto-Márquez & Wagner (2023) performed a phylogenetic analysis which recovered Malefica as a basal member of the Hadrosauridae, outside the clade Saurolophidae (=Euhadrosauria), which contains the major subfamilies Lambeosaurinae and Saurolophinae. This, along with the recovery of several hadrosauromorph taxa at the base of Hadrosauridae, adds to a greater diversity of non-saurolophid hadrosaurids known from the Santonian to Maastrichtian.

- Hadrosauridae
  - Hadrosaurus
  - - Lophorhothon
    - - - Plesiohadros
        - - Fylax
          - - Gobihadros
            - Penelopognathus
      - - Eotrachodon
        - Malefica
        - Yamatosaurus
        - - Aquilarhinus
          - Saurolophidae

== Paleoenvironment ==
The Aguja Formation outcrops both in Texas and the neighboring Mexican states of Chihuahua and Coahuila. Malefica is known from the Texan side. Other animals found in this area include the contemporary basal hadrosaurid Aquilarhinus, the lambeosaurine Angulomastacator, the pachycephalosaur Texacephale, the ceratopsid Agujaceratops, a dromaeosaurid similar to Saurornitholestes, and the giant alligatoroid Deinosuchus.
