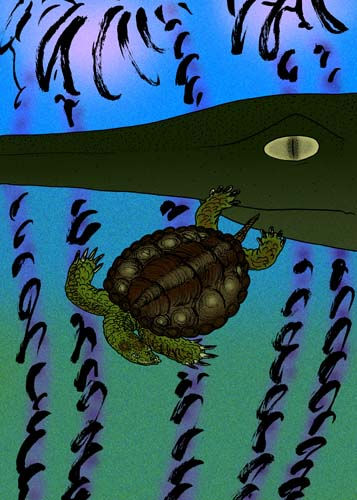
- Artist's reconstruction

Scientific classification
- Domain: Eukaryota
- Kingdom: Animalia
- Phylum: Chordata
- Class: Reptilia
- Order: Testudines
- Suborder: Pleurodira
- Family: †Bothremydidae
- Tribe: †Taphrosphyini
- Genus: †Chupacabrachelys; Lehman & Wick, 2010

Species
- C. complexus Lehman & Wick, 2010 (type)

= Chupacabrachelys =

Chupacabrachelys Temporal range: Late Cretaceous, Campanian

Extinct genus of turtles

Chupacabrachelys is an extinct genus of bothremydid turtle which existed in western Texas, United States during the late Cretaceous period (Campanian age). Its fossils were discovered in Aguja Formation in the Big Bend region, and its type example is one of the most complete bothremydid specimens known. It was first named by Thomas M. Lehman and Steven L. Wick in 2010 and the type species is Chupacabrachelys complexus. Chupacabrachelys was named after the cryptid of the same name from Mexican folklore.
