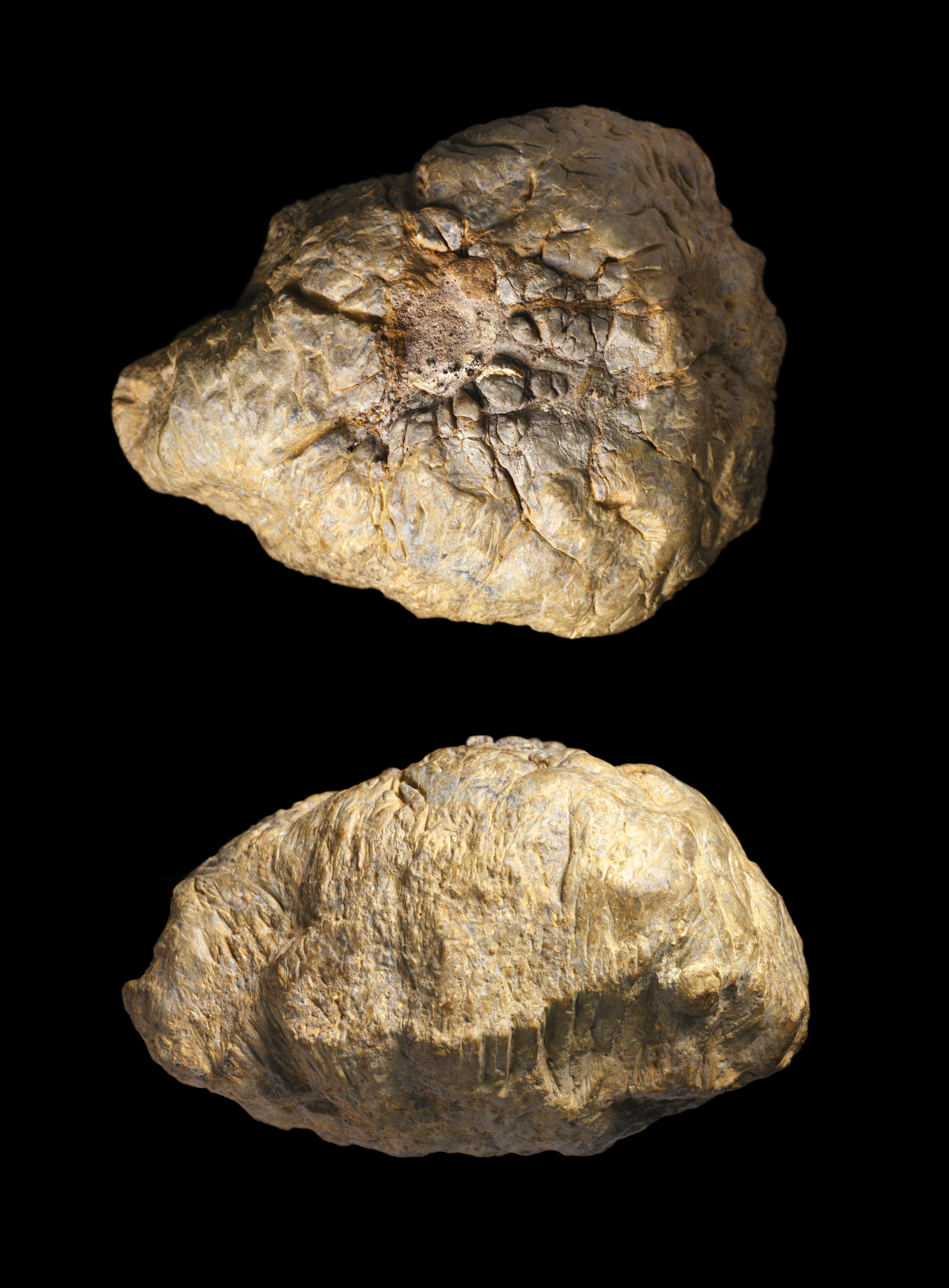
- Holotype frontoparietal dome from the Aguja Formation of Big Bend National Park, Texas

Scientific classification
- Kingdom: Animalia
- Phylum: Chordata
- Class: Reptilia
- Clade: Dinosauria
- Clade: †Ornithischia
- Clade: †Pachycephalosauria
- Family: †Pachycephalosauridae
- Genus: †Texacephale; Longrich, Sankey & Tanke, 2010
- Species: †T. langstoni

Binomial name
- †Texacephale langstoni Longrich et al., 2010

= Texacephale =

Texacephale Temporal range: Late Campanian, 77 Ma

Extinct genus of dinosaurs

Texacephale is a possibly dubious genus of pachycephalosaurid dinosaur from the Campanian stage of the Late Cretaceous. Its fossils come from the Aguja Formation of Big Bend National Park, in Texas, and were described in 2010 by Longrich, Sankey and Tanke. The generic name means Texas + "head" (kephale in Greek) in reference to its place of discovery, and the specific name langstoni honors Wann Langston. It may be a synonym of Stegoceras.

== Discovery ==
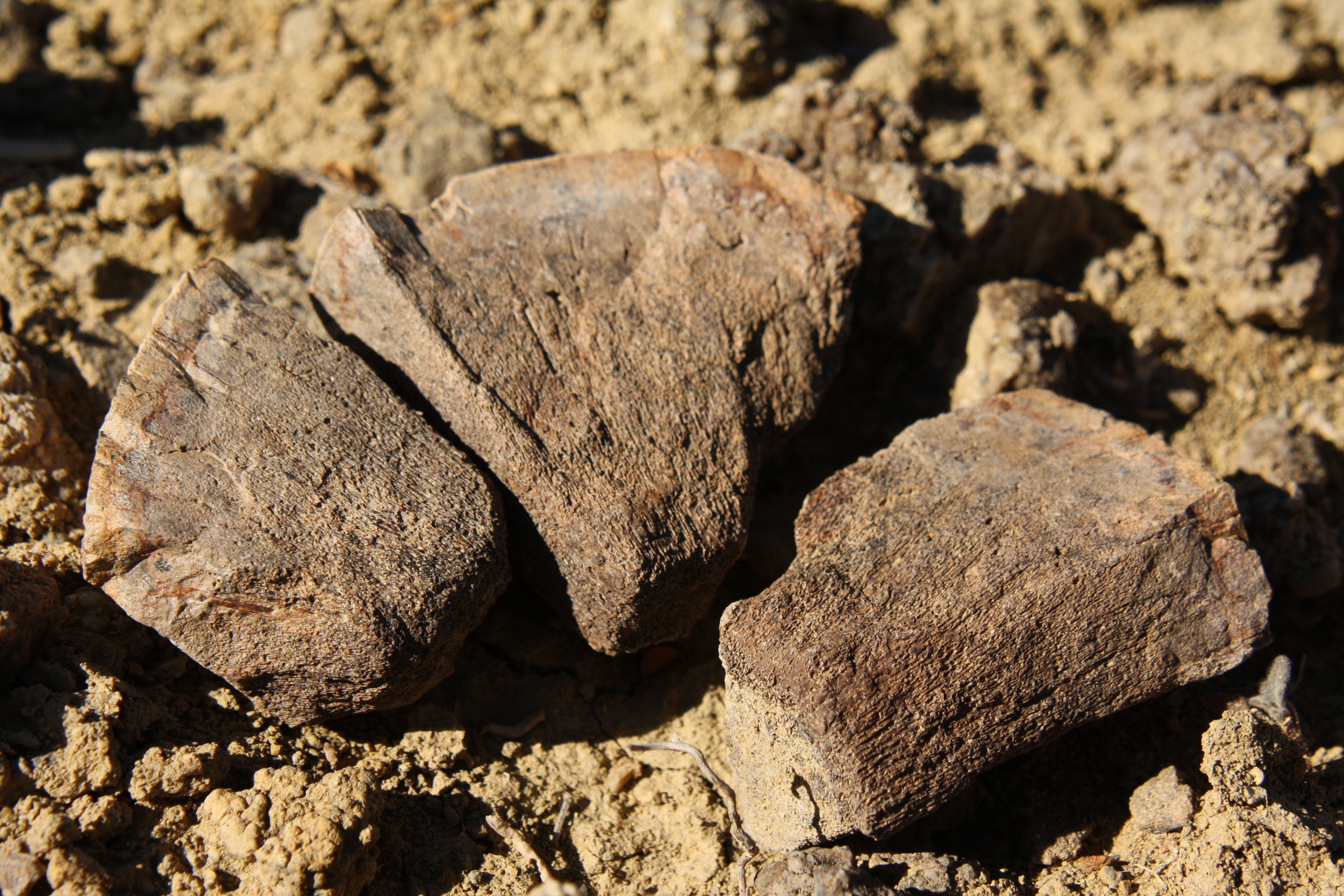
Texacephale langstoni dome discovered in the Aguja Formation

The holotype specimen of Texacephale, LSUMNS 20010, is composed of fused frontals and parietals. A second specimen, LSUMNS 20012, is composed of an incomplete frontoparietal dome. It was found in the same WPA quarries that produced Agujaceratops, and may have been excavated and tossed aside, being mistaken for a rock or concretion, before being picked up decades later. According to the team, the fossilized dome of the animal possessed five to six vertical flanges on each lateral side, connecting it with the postorbital bone. The team interpreted these structures as interlocking "gears" that would help deal with stress on the bone during head-butting, a hypothetical behavior that had earlier been challenged by other authors.

== Description ==
The holotype specimen LSUMNS 20010 consists of the fused frontals and parietals. The holotype is comparable in size to Stegoceras validum (UA2), with the frontoparietal dome measuring 115 mm long in LSUMNS 20010, versus 125 mm in UA2. The referred specimen is slightly larger: while the holotype measures 69 mm across the orbital lobes, the referred specimen measures 81 mm here. Texacephale was initially described as differing from all other pachycephalosaurids based on the following unique traits: the parietal articulates with the postorbital via a series of flange-like processes; a tall, narrow nasal boss with a dorsal margin that is convex in lateral view; the skull roof is elevated above the roof of the braincase by a low pedicel. These distinguishing characteristics were later questioned by Jasinski and Sullivan, who considered these traits to be based on misrepresentations or misinterpretations of the holotype specimen's morphology. Thus, they considered Texacephale a nomen dubium, indeterminate within the Pachycephalosauridae. In 2016, Williamson and Brusatte also agreed with this conclusion. In 2024, description of a Stegoceras specimen also from the Aguja Formation included the holotype of Texacephale in its morphometric analysis, where it was also found to be very similar to S. validum but not to the extent to which the authors of the study outright referred it to that species. Nevertheless, the authors of the study considered that the holotype of Texacephale was probably an adult specimen of the genus Stegoceras. They also considered the referred specimen too fragmentary to be referable.

== Ecology ==
Texacephale was, like other pachycephalosaurids, a small, bipedal herbivore. The thickened dome, formed by the fused frontals and parietals, with contributions from other bones of the skull, would have meant that the brain was covered by several inches of solid bone. The dome is likely to have been used in head-butting contests over mates and/or territory, similar to modern head-butting species such as bighorn sheep, cape buffalo, and musk oxen. Damage to the skull bone may have been sustained during combat.

In contrast to today's dry, desert environment, the Big Bend paleoenvironment was a wet, coastal lowland on the edge of the Western Interior Seaway during the Campanian. Texacephale shared its environment with Agujaceratops mariscalensis, a ceratopsid. Tyrannosaurids and the giant crocodilian Deinosuchus riograndensis were also present in the Aguja environment, and were likely to have been predators.

== Phylogeny ==
Cladogram after Longrich, Sankey and Tanke (2010).

- Pachycephalosauridae
  - - Stegoceras
    - - Gravitholus
      - Colepiocephale
  - Texacephale
  - Hanssuesia
  - - Sphaerotholus brevis
    - - S. goodwini
      - - S. edmontonense
        - S. bucholtzae
    - - Pachycephalosaurini
        - Alaskacephale
        - Pachycephalosaurus
        - - Stygimoloch
          - Dracorex
      - - Tylocephale
        - Prenocephale
        - - Homalocephale
          - Goyocephale
          - Wannanosaurus

== See also ==
- Timeline of pachycephalosaur research
