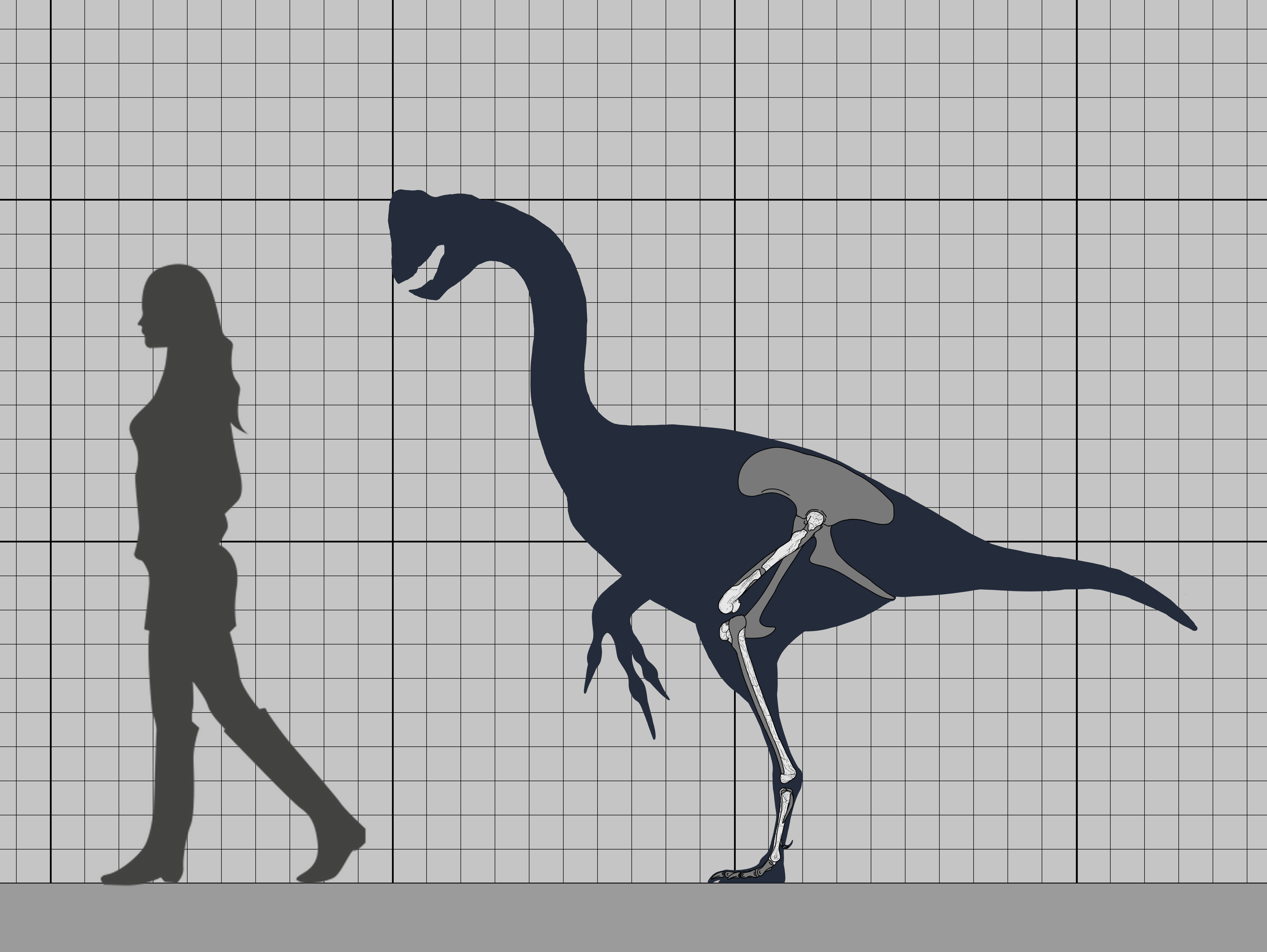
- Fossil material known from Eoneophron

Scientific classification
- Kingdom: Animalia
- Phylum: Chordata
- Class: Reptilia
- Clade: Dinosauria
- Clade: Saurischia
- Clade: Theropoda
- Family: †Caenagnathidae
- Genus: †Eoneophron
- Species: †E. infernalis

Binomial name
- †Eoneophron infernalis Atkins-Weltman et al., 2024

= Eoneophron =

Eoneophron Temporal range: Late Cretaceous, late Maastrichtian

Genus of oviraptorosaurian dinosaurs

Eoneophron (meaning "dawn Neophron") is an extinct genus of caenagnathid theropod dinosaur from the Late Cretaceous Hell Creek Formation of South Dakota, US. The genus contains a single species, E. infernalis, known from a partial hindlimb.

== Discovery and naming ==
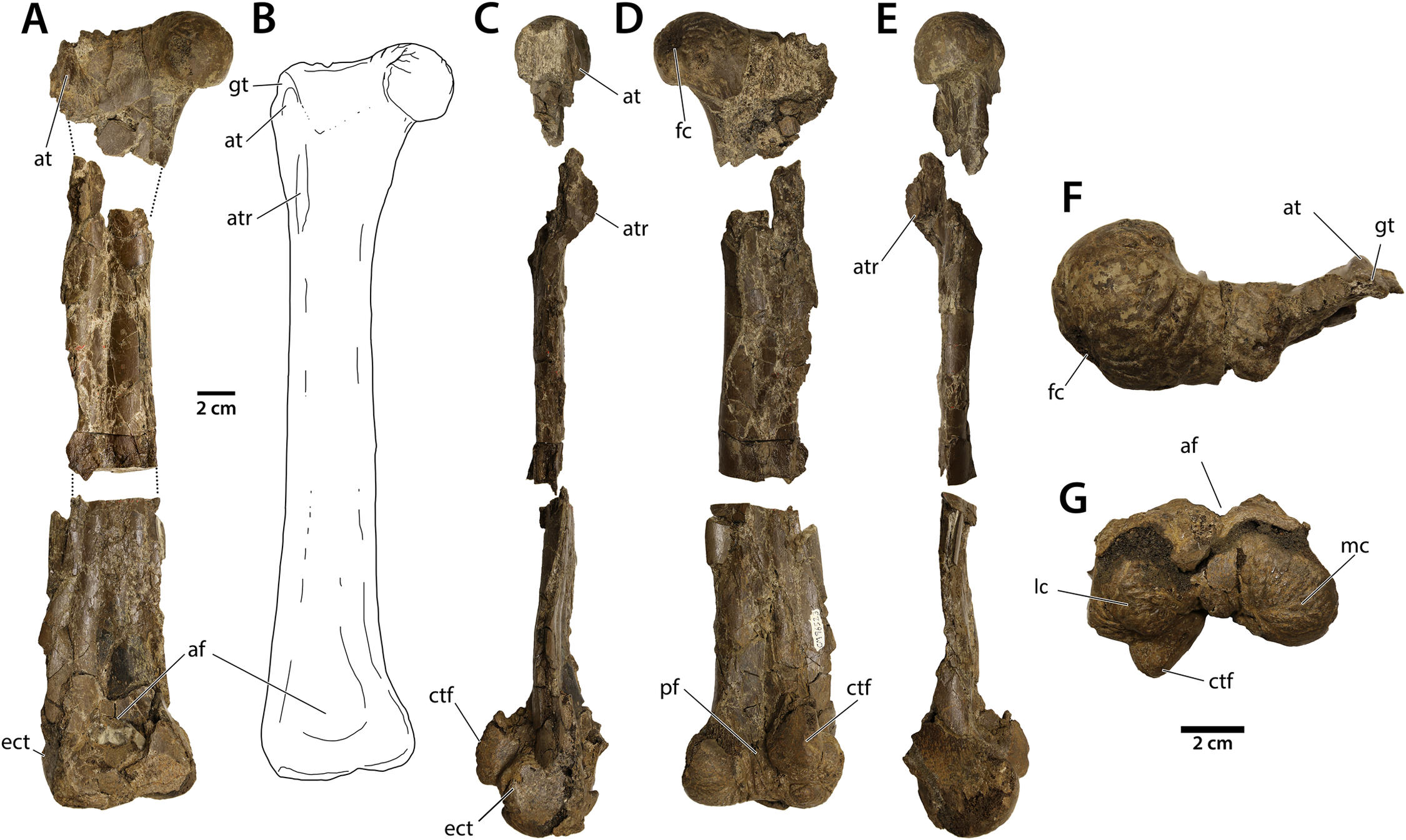
Left femur of the holotype

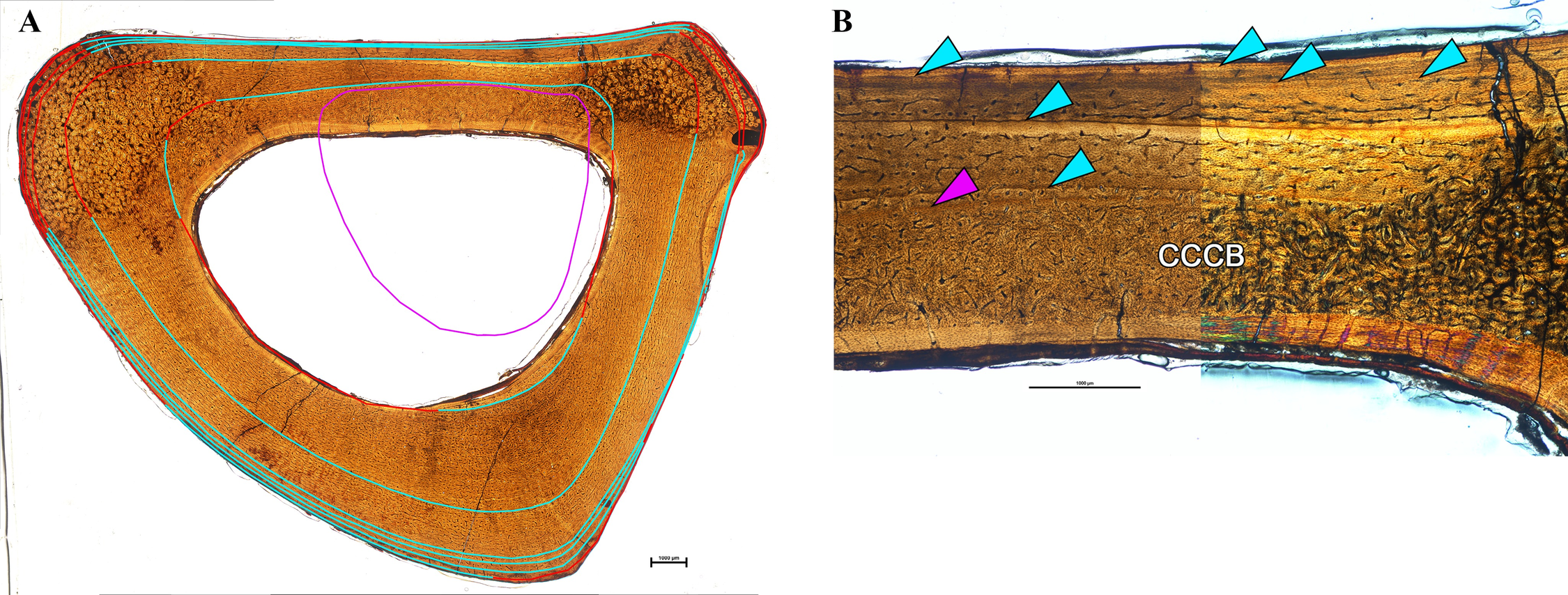
Osteological thin section of one of the holotype metatarsals of Eoneophron, with observed LAGs outlined in light blue and red

The Eoneophron fossil material was discovered in sediments of the Hell Creek Formation in Meade County, South Dakota, United States. The specimen, which consists of a partial right hindlimb, was prepared and initially listed for commercial sale before being purchased in 2020 for $5,000 by Kyle Atkins-Weltman. He then donated the specimen to the Carnegie Museum of Natural History for research. Preliminary observation of the material had suggested that the bones belonged to a juvenile specimen of Anzu, a related dinosaur from the same formation. However, after analyzing the histology of the bones, Atkins-Weltman and colleagues determined that the individual would have been skeletally mature when it died. Based on the observed lines of arrested growth (LAGs), they further estimated that the animal was in the sixth year of life when it died.

In 2024, Atkins-Weltman et al. described Eoneophron infernalis as a new genus and species of caenagnathid oviraptorosaur based on these fossil remains. CM 96523, the holotype specimen, consists of bones from the right leg, including the femur, the tibia with fused astragalocalcaneum, and metatarsals III and IV.

The generic name, Eoneophron, combines the Ancient Greek word "èos", meaning "dawn", with "Neophron", the generic name of the Egyptian vulture, which has been referred to as "pharaoh's chicken". This name was chosen in part to honor the lead author's pet nile monitor, named Pharaoh. The specific name, "infernalis", is derived from the Latin word for Hell, referencing the discovery of the fossil material in the Hell Creek Formation. The full binomial name also references the press nickname—"chicken from hell"—given to the related Anzu wyliei.

== Description ==
After accounting for taphonomic distortion, Atkins-Weltman et al. determined that the femur of Eoneophron would have had a circumference of 10.58 centimetres (4.17 in). Using this, they estimated that Eoneophron had a body mass of approximately 78 kilograms (172 lb). This is larger than several other caenagnathids, such as Anomalipes, Apatoraptor, Chirostenotes, and Elmisaurus, all of which weighed under 70 kilograms (150 lb). The contemporary Anzu was even larger than Eoneophron, weighing between 202–342 kilograms (445–754 lb).

== Classification ==
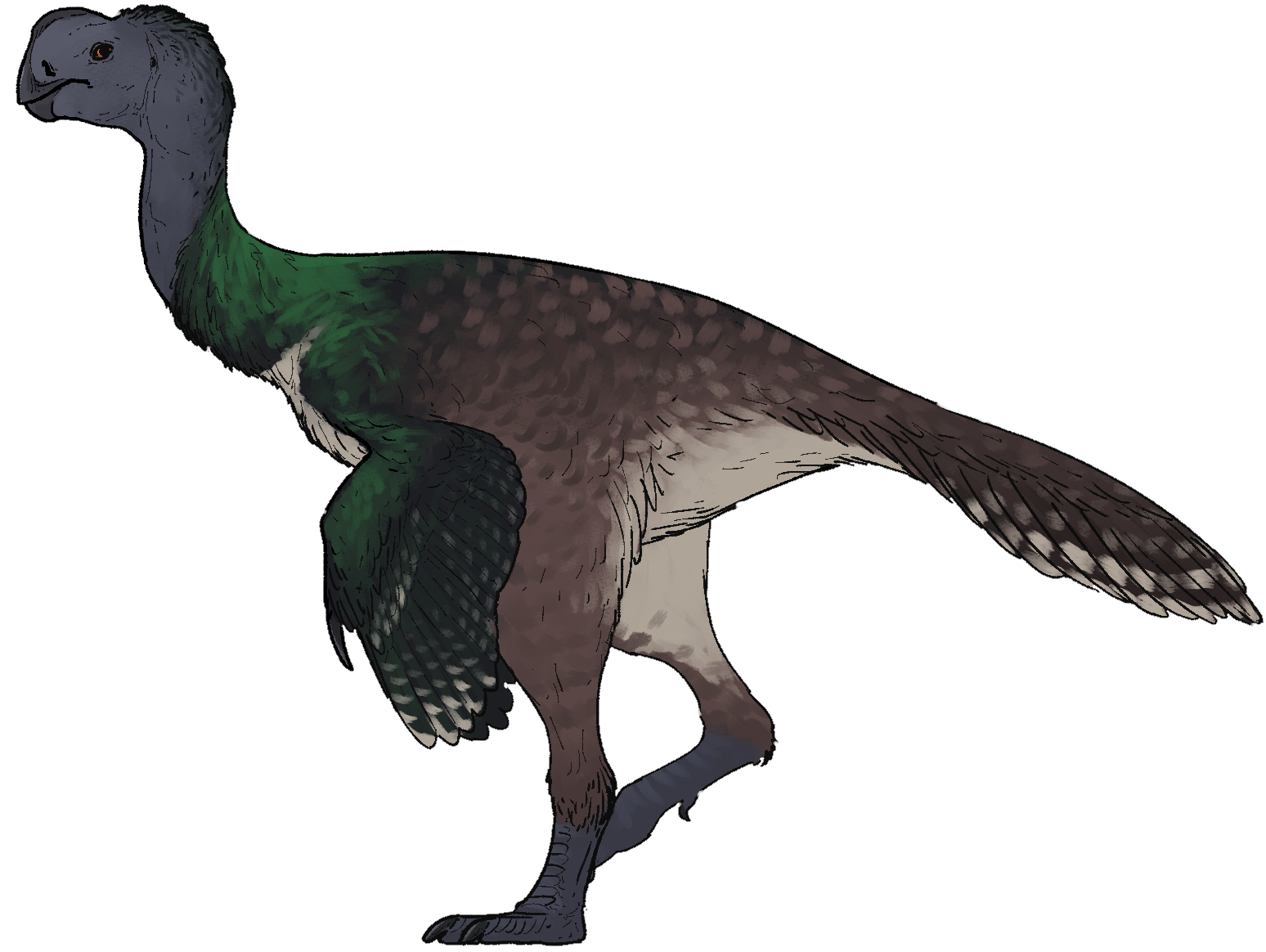
Life restoration of Eoneophron

In their phylogenetic analysis, Atkins-Weltman et al. (2024) recovered Eoneophron as the sister taxon to a clade comprising Citipes and Elmisaurus. The following cladogram represents the phylogenetic results of a majority rule consensus tree built on 504 most parsimonious trees.

- Oviraptorosauria
  - Incisivosaurus
  - - Caudipteryx spp.
    - - Avimimus spp.
      - - Oviraptoridae
        - Caenagnathidae
          - Microvenator
          - - Gigantoraptor
            - - Caenagnathasia
              - Nomingia
              - Epichirostenotes
              - Anomalipes
              - - Chirostenotes
                - Hagryphus
              - - Eoneophron
                - - Citipes
                  - Elmisaurus
              - - Apatoraptor
                - - Caenagnathus
                  - Anzu

== Paleoenvironment ==
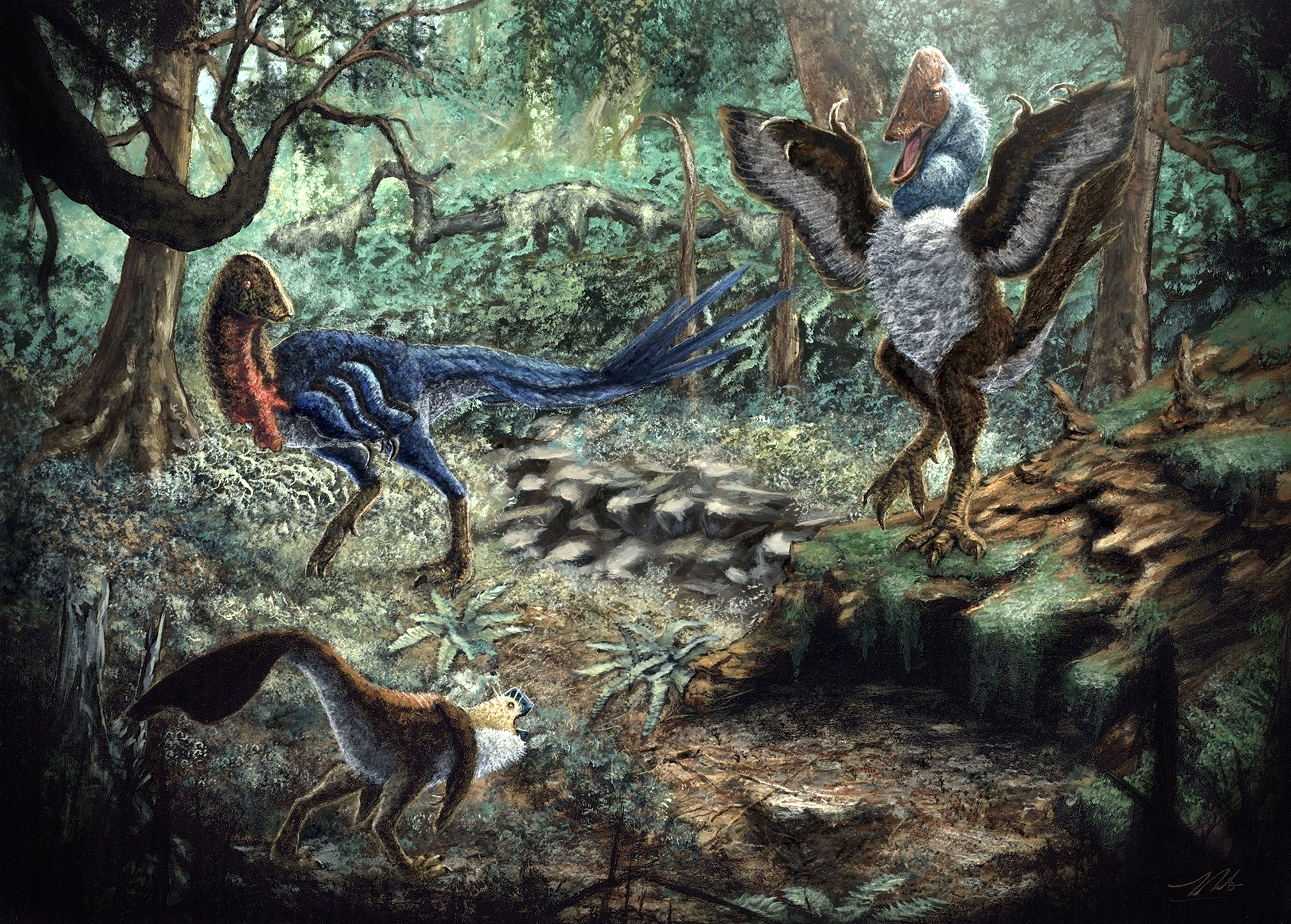
Environmental reconstruction of three Hell Creek caenagnathids (Eoneophron top left)

Eoneophron is known from the Late Cretaceous Hell Creek Formation of South Dakota, United States, which dates to the latest Maastrichtian age of the late Cretaceous period. Many other dinosaurs, including the fellow caenagnathids Anzu and Infernogallus, are also known from the formation.
