= Infernogallus =

Infernogallus Temporal range: Late Cretaceous, late Maastrichtian
- Holotype specimen (top) and reconstructed skeleton (bottom) with a histological cross-section of the leg bone

Scientific classification
- Kingdom: Animalia
- Phylum: Chordata
- Class: Reptilia
- Clade: Dinosauria
- Clade: Saurischia
- Clade: Theropoda
- Family: †Caenagnathidae
- Clade: †Eucaenagnathinae
- Genus: †Infernogallus; Funston et al., 2026
- Species: †I. jamesi

Binomial name
- †Infernogallus jamesi Funston et al., 2026

Genus of theropod dinosaur

Infernogallus (lit. 'Hell chicken') is an extinct genus of oviraptorosaurian theropod dinosaur in the family Caenagnathidae, known from multiple localities in the Late Cretaceous (Maastrichtian age) Hell Creek Formation of the United States. The genus contains a single species, Infernogallus jamesi, known from a partial articulated skull and skeleton and several isolated cranial remains. With an estimated body mass of around 12 kg (26 lb), it is a small caenagnathid. The skull of the holotype specimen is the first nearly complete and articulated skull discovered for a caenagnathid. It shows a reorganization of jaw muscles that may be an adaptation for fruit eating, similar to some modern parrots but unique among non-avian theropods.

== Discovery and naming ==
Describing author David C. Evans at the type locality

The Infernogallus fossil material was discovered in outcrops of the Hell Creek Formation distributed throughout the Great Plains region of the United States. Five specimens are known, collected by different research groups at different times. In July 2011, C. Phipps collected a partial, articulated skeleton on private land in northwestern Garfield County, Montana. The specimen, which is preserved within a sandstone concretion, underwent initial preparation shortly following its excavation, after which it was acquired by the Royal Ontario Museum (ROM; Ontario, Canada), where preparation was finished. Now permanently accessioned as specimen ROM VP 65050, it consists of a nearly complete skull and mandible, a complete series of cervical (neck) and dorsal (trunk) vertebrae, the right pectoral girdle and forelimb, and part of the pelvis and right hindlimb. Since the block preserving the specimen was separated into four smaller pieces, some regions are now missing, such as the part of the scapula and elbow region.

Two additional ROM specimens, comprising partial lower jaw remains, were collected in south-central Garfield County. They include ROM VP 64193, the fused partial left and right dentaries, and ROM VP 64194, an articular-surangular-coronoid complex. Their similarity in size and preservation style suggests they likely belong to a single individual. ROM VP 88690, a pair of pterygoids (palate bones), was collected near Faith, South Dakota, after which the ROM acquired it in 2015. In 2019, Denver Fowler collected a pair of fused, partial dentaries from a microvertebrate accumulation in southwestern Bowman County, North Dakota (Mud Buttes area). It is now accessioned as North Dakota Geological Survey (NDGS) 4351. These additional pairs of dentaries are better preserved than those of the 2011 specimen, wherein the dentaries are quite crushed.

In July 2026, Bazzana-Adams and colleagues used CT scans to describe the inner ear anatomy of ROM VP 65050 (then unnamed) and two other caenagnathid specimens.

In October 2026, Gregory F. Funston and colleagues described Infernogallus jamesi as a new genus and species of caenagnathid theropod based on these fossil remains, designating ROM VP 65050 as the holotype specimen. ROM VP 64193, 64194, and 88690 and NDGS 4351 were assigned to this species as paratypes. The generic name, Infernogallus, is derived from the Latin words īnfernus, referring to 'Hell', and gallus, meaning '(male) chicken'. This alludes to both the discovery of this taxon in the Hell Creek Formation and its small, superficially bird-like form. The specific name, jamesi, honors James William Boyd, the grandfather of Clint Boyd (one of the describing authors), who inspired his interest in paleontology. The holotype skull of I. jamesi is the first articulated and nearly complete skull discovered for a caenagnathid oviraptorosaur. The contemporary Anzu preserves the next best skull, but is only known from disarticulated and incomplete remains. Other caenagnathids with cranial material (Apatoraptor, Elmisaurus, and Epichirostenotes) are even more fragmentary. As such, the skull of Infernogallus offers the first detailed look at the full skull of members of this clade. The significance of this discovery was emphasized by paleontologists Stephen Brusatte and Case Vincent Miller when interviewed about the publication.

== Description ==
Size compared to a human

As a caenagnathid, Infernogallus is a birdlike theropod with a toothless beak, small crested skull, long neck, short torso, and long legs. It was small, with the holotype having an estimated body mass of between 9–15 kg (20–33 lb) based on the circumference of the femur, which is 18.5 centimetres (7.3 in) long. Despite this small size, histological analysis of the femur, fibula, and second metatarsal revealed a series of closely spaced growth marks near the outer surface of the bones, indicative of an external fundamental system (a signal of skeletal maturity). The histology further suggests the animal was at least 6—probably 7—years old when it died, at which point it was fully grown. As such, Infernogallus is substantially smaller than the two other named Hell Creek caenagnathids: Eoneophron, estimated to weigh 78 kilograms (172 lb), and Anzu, estimated at 202–342 kilograms (445–754 lb).

=== Skull ===
Photograph (a) and line drawing (b) of holotype skull as preserved and µCT renderings with (c) and without (d) mandible included

The skull is highly modified compared to most other theropods, with several unusual traits. It is superficially most similar to that of oviraptorids (the caenagnathid sister group), clearly distinct from that reconstructed for the more closely related Anzu. As the skull anatomy of other eucaenagnathines is poorly documented, it is unclear whether much of this unique anatomy is unique to Infernogallus or typical of its relatives as well.

Much of the unique anatomy concerns the side of the skull, the temporal region. The orbit (eye hole) is large and circular, taking up almost 40% of the skull's total length. Contrastingly, the infratemporal fenestra (a hole behind the orbit for jaw muscles) is extremely small, only 25% the diameter of the orbit. The jugal (a cheek bone forming the lower rim of the orbit) has been significantly reshaped by the large orbit and small infratemporal fenestra. Its overall shape is broad, unlike the thin rodlike structure seen in other oviraptorosaurs. Its front end forks into a forward-projecting process connecting to the maxilla (jawbone), more developed than in other oviraptorosaurs, and an upward-projecting process connecting to the lacrimal and forming part of the orbit's front edge. This lacrimal process is otherwise absent in all but the earliest oviraptorosaurs. The back end of the jugal (forming the front rim of the infratemporal fenestra) is very broad and, uniquely among oviraptorosaurs, makes contact with the squamosal bone. Behind the jugal, the quadratojugal has a large circular projection, while it is only a small tab in other oviraptorosaurs. This forms a large external ear canal along with the squamosal. The squamosal itself is broad top to bottom, and lacks the typical depression and ridge used to support adductor muscles.

Reconstructed skulls of Infernogallus (left) and the oviraptorid Citipati (right); note the maxillovomeral protrusion (mvp) and pterygoid (pt), outlined in blue dotted line, as well as the position of the pterygoideus muscle (mPTv)

As in other oviraptorosaurs, the palate (roof of the mouth) is highly modified. Oviraptorosaurs typically possess two prominent protrusions from the palate: a maxillovomeral process formed by the maxilla (jawbone) and the vomer, and one formed by the ectopterygoid and pterygoid bones. In Infernogallus, both are exceptionally large, projecting far below the rest of the palate. The ectopterygoid-pterygoid bar in particular would have filled most of the oral cavity. In other oviraptorosaurs, the pterygoid only extends slightly downwards and has a small, narrow shelf at the bottom. In Infernogallus, the pterygoid curves strongly downwards and has a long, broad shelf at its bottom. A prominent roughened pad termed the pterygoid buttress is present on the outer edge of the shelf. An earlier caenagnathid, Microvenator, shows similar traits but in less extreme form. In particular, the size of the pterygoid shelf is much more developed in Infernogallus than in Microvenator with large depressions on the top and bottom for attachment of the pterygoideus muscles. The ectopterygoid, connecting the pterygoid and the jugal, is especially simplified and reduced compared to other oviraptorosaurs, whereas the palatine is especially robust and broad.

Scan of paratype dentary (NDGS 4351)

As in other caenagnathids, the left and right mandibles (lower jaws) are fused and steeply upturned when seen from the side. This forms the animal's toothless beak, similar to living turtles and birds. The inside edge of the mandible bears prominent grooves and ridges, a key feature unique to caenagnathids. Amongst these was a large sulcus (groove) present over the mandibular symphysis (the point where the left and right mandibles meet), into which the maxillovomeral protrusion would have fit when the mouth was closed. Underneath the symphysis, there was a prominent insertion for the genioglossus muscle, likely supporting a powerful tongue. This insertion is W-shaped, unlike the heart or hourglass shape seen in other caegnathids. The 'chin' region of the dentary is round, similar to Chirostenotes but distinct from the more squared 'chins' of Leptorhynchos and Elmisaurus. Like other caengnathids, there is a largely elliptical mandibular fenestra spanning around 35% of the length of the mandible. A deep fossa is present in front of the fenestra, and just below this is small, sideward-projecting tubercle unseen in other caenagnathids. The articular, which forms the jaw joint with the quadrate bone of the skull, has a prominent rounded ridge that slots into the saddle-shaped ends of the quadrate, allowing forward and backward motion of the mandible.

=== Postcrania ===
Holotype neck and body (left), hand (right, a–c), and foot (right, d)

Infernogallus has a long neck, composed of twelve cervical vertebrae in addition to the atlas and axis, the first two vertebrae that serve to attach the head. The epipophyses (projecting muscle attachment points near the top of vertebrae) are very reduced compared to other oviraptorosaurs. As in birds and other theropods, the vertebrae are hollow, with extensive pneumatic air spaces. The torso, as in other caenagnathids, was rather short. The shoulder blade was thin and minimally expanded. As in other oviraptorosaurs, it bore a large acromion, an attachment point for a boomerang-shaped furcula. As in relatives such as Apatoraptor and Elmisaurus, the arms inserted into the shoulder joint from the side, potentially allowing more arm motion. The large deltapectoral crest of the upper arm was shorter than that of some oviraptorids, and the ulna, a lower bone, was bowed instead of straight as in heyuannine oviraptorids. The hands were long and would have been able to grasp. The second metacarpal (hand bone) is the longest, and has a shallow ridge on its extensor surface absent in other caenagnathids. The fingers are similar in proportion to those of related caenagnathids such as Elmisaurus and Hagryphus, and bear curved claws. The rear part of the ilium (part of the hip) is broken off, but the observable front half is lower than in Chirostenotes and Caenagnathus, being more similar to Elmisaurus. As a caenagnathid, Infernogallus has long limbs and long, splayed toes, with curved claws at their ends. Unlike in Elmisaurus and Citipes, the foot bones were not extensively fused together. The tail is unpreserved, but is short in other caenagnathids.

== Classification ==
Life restoration of Infernogallus

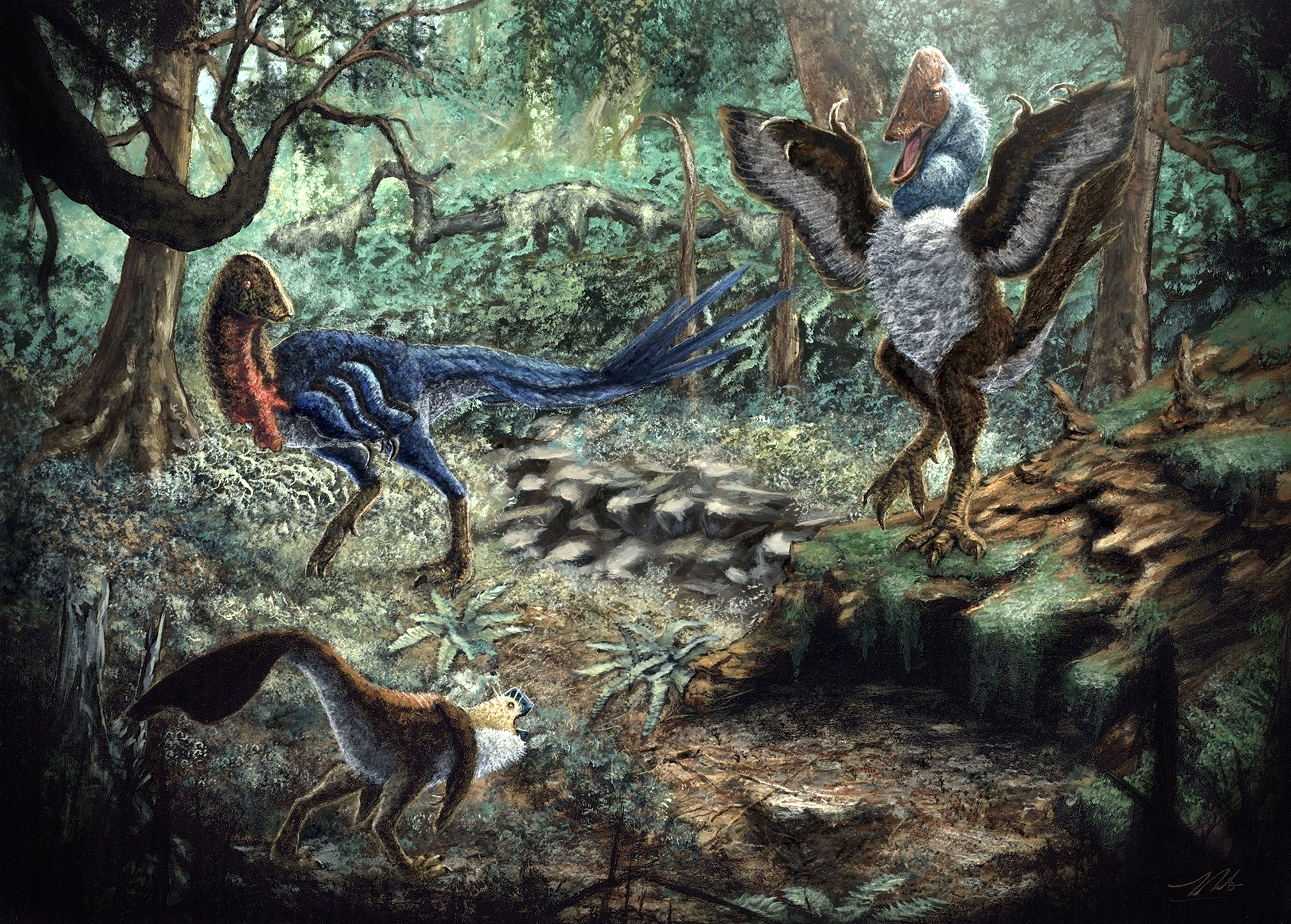
Environmental reconstruction of three Hell Creek caenagnathids, including Eoneophron (top left) and Anzu (right)

To test the affinities and relationships of Infernogallus, Funston et al. (2026) included it in an extensively updated version of the phylogenetic matrix of Funston et al. (2020). The exact interrelationships and resolution of caenagnathids varied based on the analytical methodologies used. Their time-scaled Bayesian tree recovered Infernogallus as the sister taxon to a clade including Epichirostenotes, Elmisaurus, and Citipes. These 'elmisaurins' were recovered alongside several 'caenagnathins' (e.g., Anzu, Caenagnathus, and Chirostenotes) in a derived caenagnathid clade the authors called Eucaenagnathinae. Due to the instability and inconsistency of interrelationships, Funston and colleagues cautioned against formally establishing these subclades, but recognized the persistence of certain groupings. These results are displayed in the cladogram below.

- Caenagnathoidea
  - Oviraptoridae
  - Caenagnathidae
    - Microvenator
    - - Gigantoraptor
      - - Anomalipes
        - - Caenagnathasia
          - Eucaenagnathinae
            - - Chirostenotes
              - Hagryphus
            - - - Apatoraptor
                - - Anzu
                  - Caenagnathus
              - - Eoneophron
                - - Infernogallus
                  - - Epichirostenotes
                    - - Citipes
                      - Elmisaurus

'caenagnathins'
'elmisaurins'

== Paleobiology ==
In their study of the inner ear of Infernogallus, Bazzana‐Adams and colleagues recognized a relatively short cochlea, consistent with reduced auditory sensitivity or discrimination compared to other theropods. If this is a widespread feature in caenagnathids, it seems to contradict the carnivorous ecology postulated for some species, which would benefit from enhanced hearing capabilities when seeking prey.

Reconstructed chewing stroke of Infernogallus

Several unique features of the jaw and temporal region help to clarify the diet and functional morphology of Infernogallus. The muscles associated with the palate are enlarged, while those associated with the temporal region are reduced, indicative of a weaker bite force than non-caenagnathid oviraptorosaurs. The arrangement of the quadrate and articular (upper and lower jaw bones comprising the jaw joint) indicates that the lower jaw would be able to slide forward, up to ~14% of the skull length. Finally, the occlusal surfaces of the jaws would have been highly textured in life, allowing for the effective crushing and shearing of soft foods. This would be aided by the strong tongue, as suggested by the muscle insertion site on the mandible. Enhanced tongue mobility in caenagnathids is suggested by the relatively long hyoids (not preserved in Infernogallus), as in modern birds with mobile tongues. Taken together, these features suggest a highly specialized chewing stroke and food processing mechanism in Infernogallus. This contrasts with more 'primitive' oviraptorosaurs (e.g., Caudipteryx) which lack these features and likely relied on a high-fiber plant diet, the digestion of which was facilitated by the intake of gastroliths. The body cavity of Infernogallus is complete and articulated, including the complete gastral basket, but no gastroliths are evident, suggesting they were not involved in this species' digestion. Some adaptations for durophagy (consuming hard-shelled animals) are seen in oviraptorids, but not in caenagnathids. Caenagnathids thus likely relied on a non-fibrous, soft diet that still required oral processing and manipulation.

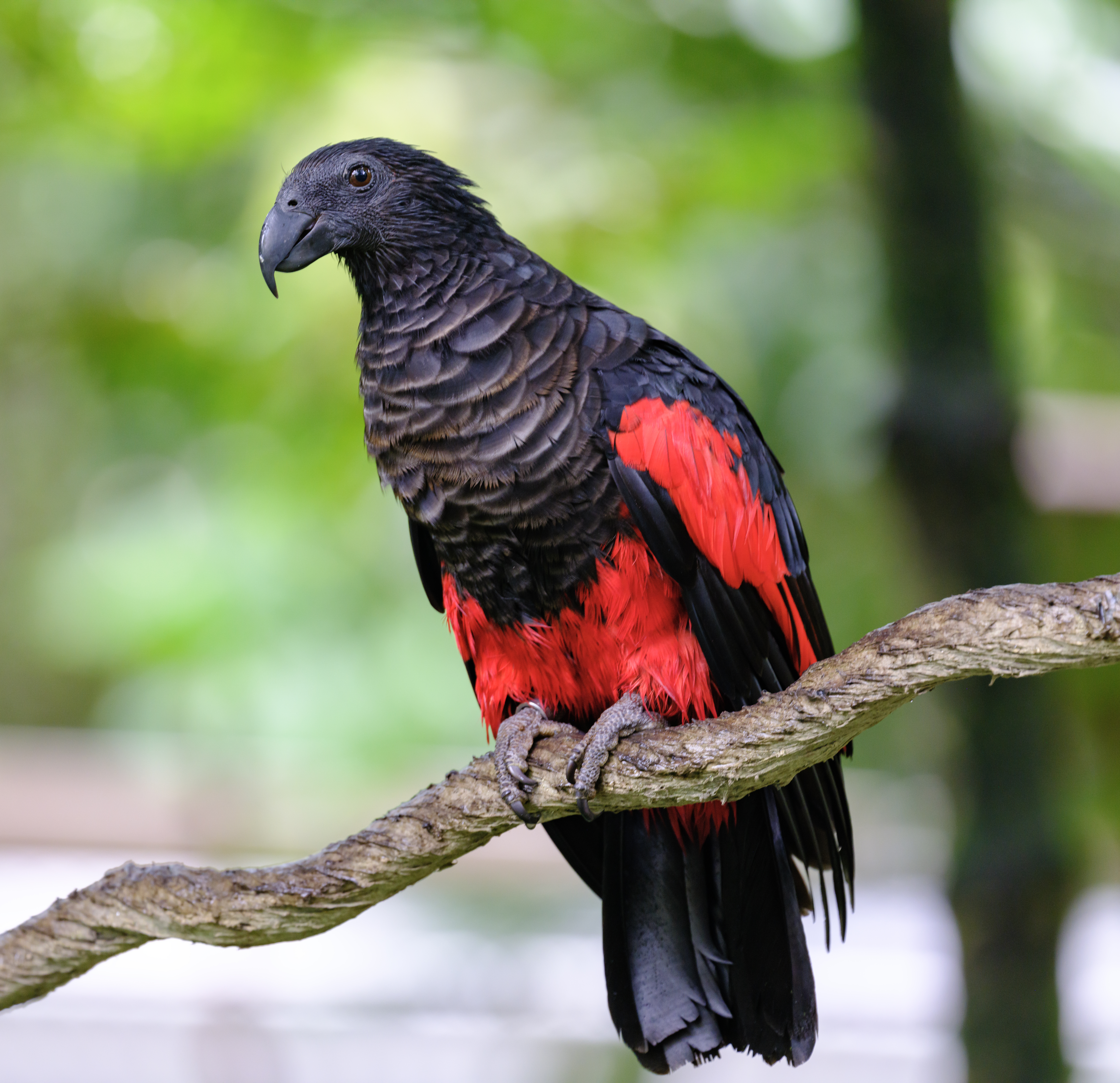
Infernogallus may have eaten fruit in a way similar to Pesquet's parrot

The closest living analog to the skull structure and muscle functions of Infernogallus is Pesquet's parrot (Psittrichas fulgidus). This parrot is adapted to frugivory (fruit eating), which it does by eating the pulp and discarding the seed. Most other parrots are granivorous, targeting the seed. The comparatively longer and lower skull and mandible of P. fuldigus are reminiscent of the skull modifications of caenagnathids like Infernogallus compared to other oviraptorosaurs. Fossil evidence suggests caenagnathids originated soon after angiosperm fruits, including those with a single internal seed surrounded by a fleshy mesocarp (called drupes). The oldest and earliest-diverging caenagnathid, Microvenator, exhibits some of the adaptations for oral processing seen in Infernogallus. It is thus possible that the increasingly derived jaw and palate structure of caenagnathids paralleled the diversification of drupes in the Late Cretaceous. Overall, Infernogallus was likely frugivorous, engaging in fruit defleshing, as in Pesquet's parrot.

== See also ==
- Timeline of oviraptorosaur research
- Paleobiota of the Hell Creek Formation
