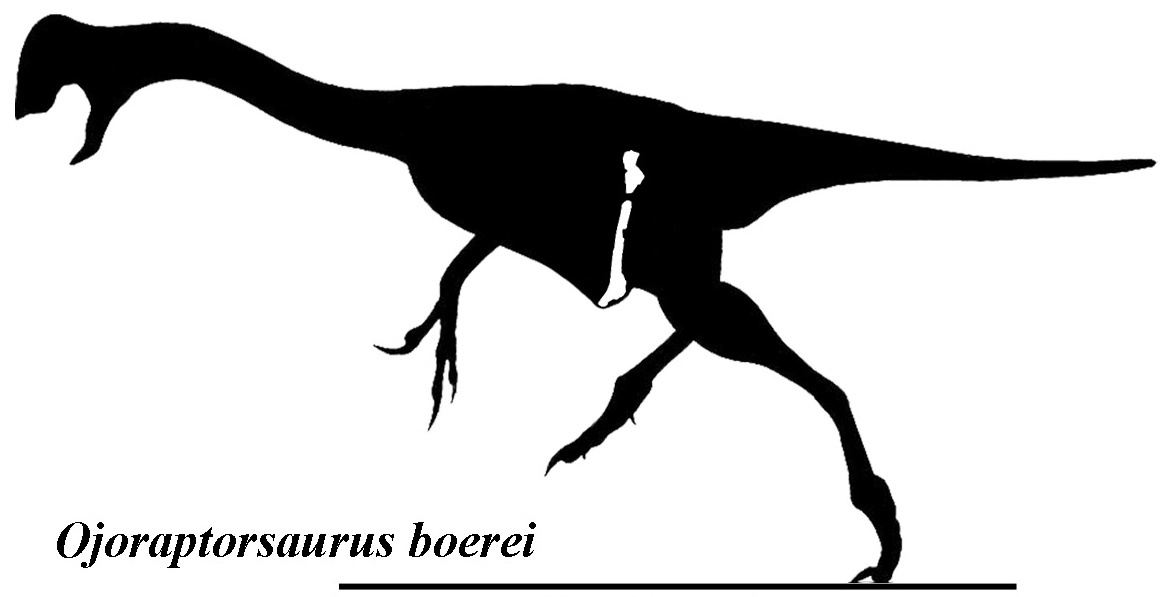
- Silhouette showing the pubis bones

Scientific classification
- Kingdom: Animalia
- Phylum: Chordata
- Class: Reptilia
- Clade: Dinosauria
- Clade: Saurischia
- Clade: Theropoda
- Superfamily: †Caenagnathoidea
- Family: †Caenagnathidae
- Genus: †Ojoraptorsaurus; Sullivan et al., 2011
- Species: †O. boerei

Binomial name
- †Ojoraptorsaurus boerei Sullivan et al., 2011

= Ojoraptorsaurus =

Ojoraptorsaurus Temporal range: Late Cretaceous, 66.5 Ma

Extinct genus of dinosaurs

Ojoraptorsaurus is a dubious genus of oviraptorosaurian dinosaur from the late Cretaceous. Ojoraptorsaurus is only known from pubic bones found at the Naashoibito Member of the Ojo Alamo Formation dating to the late Maastrichtian, about 66 million years ago. It was first named by Robert M. Sullivan, Steven E. Jasinski and Mark P.A. van Tomme in 2011 and the type species is Ojoraptorsaurus boerei. The generic name combines a reference to the formation with a Latin raptor, "plunderer", and a Latinised Greek saurus, "lizard". The specific name honours oceanographer Arjan Boeré who found the specimen.

== Description ==
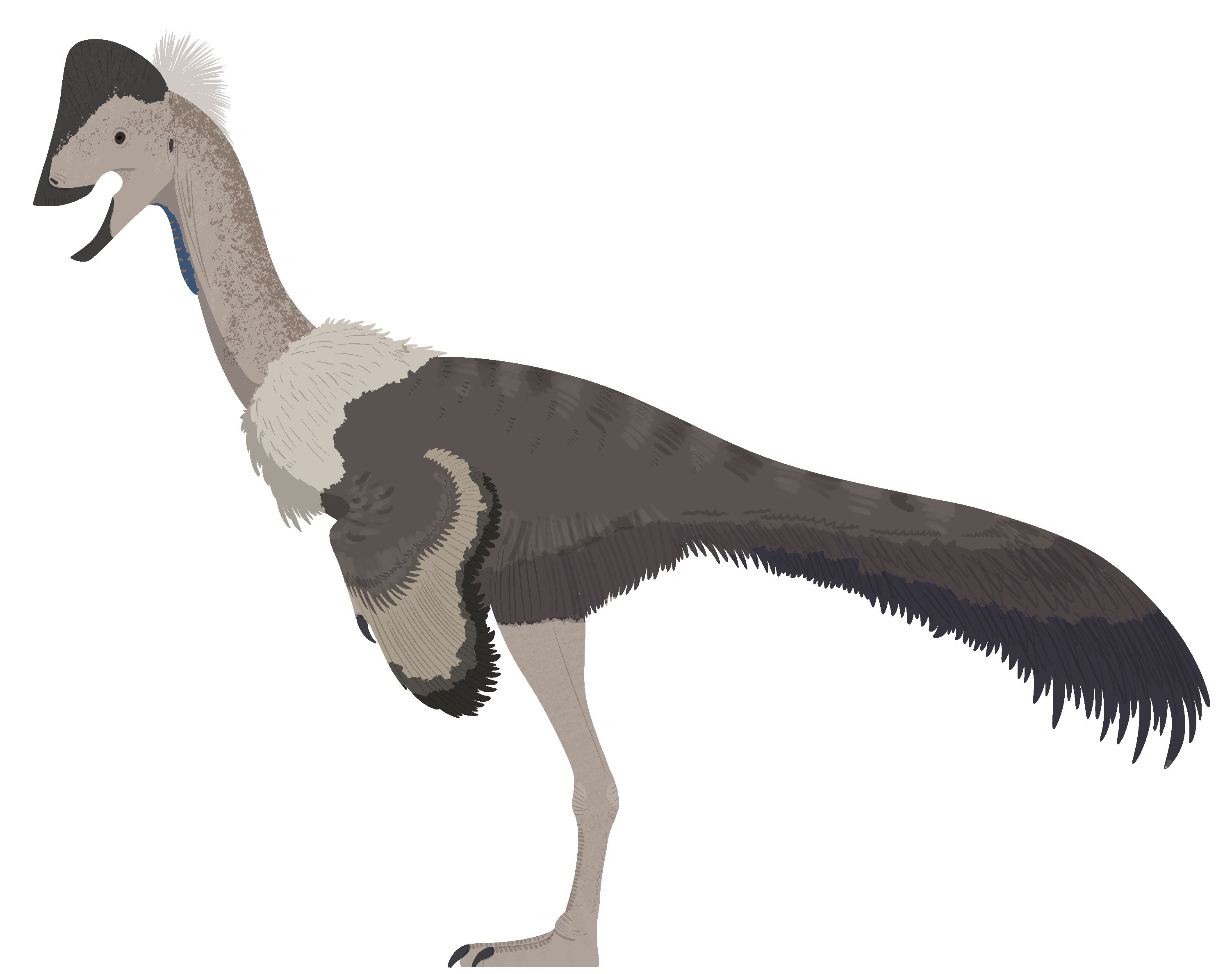
Speculative life restoration

The holotype of Ojoraptorsaurus is SMP VP-1458, an incomplete pair of fused pubes. Due to the fusion of the pubes, this specimen is believed to have been a mature individual. Most caenagnathid species are known from very few remains, and Ojoraptorsaurus is no exception. The holotype was compared to well-described pubic remains of other oviraptorosaurians, namely Microvenator, Epichirostenotes, Nomingia, and CM 78001 (now known as Anzu). It shares with the latter three taxa an enclosed fossa on the inside edge of the pubis near the acetabular rim, a trait which may be diagnostic to caenagnathids (in which case Nomingia is a caenagnathid). Ojoraptorsaurus's fossa is further away from the acetabular rim than those of the other species, a feature characteristic to the genus. Among compared oviraptorosaurians, Ojoraptorsaurus is most similar to Epichirostenotes, a genus differentiated from Chirostenotes in the same paper that Ojoraptorsarus was described in. By comparing pubic proportions with those of CM 78001 (Anzu), Ojoraptorsaurus has been estimated to have been about 1.8 to 2.1 meters (5.9 to 6.9 ft) in length, about 20% smaller than Epichirostenotes.

In its 2011 description, Ojoraptorsaurus was suggested to differ from other caenagnathids due to possessing the following autapomorphies:

- A “spoon-shaped” depression on the anterior dorsal surface of the pubic boot.
- An enclosed fossa on the inside edge of the pubis which lies 1 centimeter away from the acetabular rim.
- The portion of the pubic shaft directly above the pubic boot being slightly anteriorly convex.
- A sub-trapezoidal iliac peduncle articular surface of the pubis.

In 2024, Wick, Lehman & Fortner suggested that Ojoraptorsaurus should be best regarded as an indeterminate caenagnathid in need of additional specimens to verify its validity, since the initial diagnosis on the ostensibly diagnostic features of the poorly preserved holotype is most likely a result of taphonomic distortion and the allegedly diagnostic feature of its pubic foot is also known in other oviraptorosaurs. In the same year, Funston, Williamson & Brusatte suggested that, even though Ojoraptorsaurus could be seen as distinct due to its unique stratigraphic position and provenance, it should be considered a nomen dubium since none of the supposed unique features are actually diagnostic for caenagnathids, and some may result from taphonomic distortion.

== See also ==
- Timeline of oviraptorosaur research
