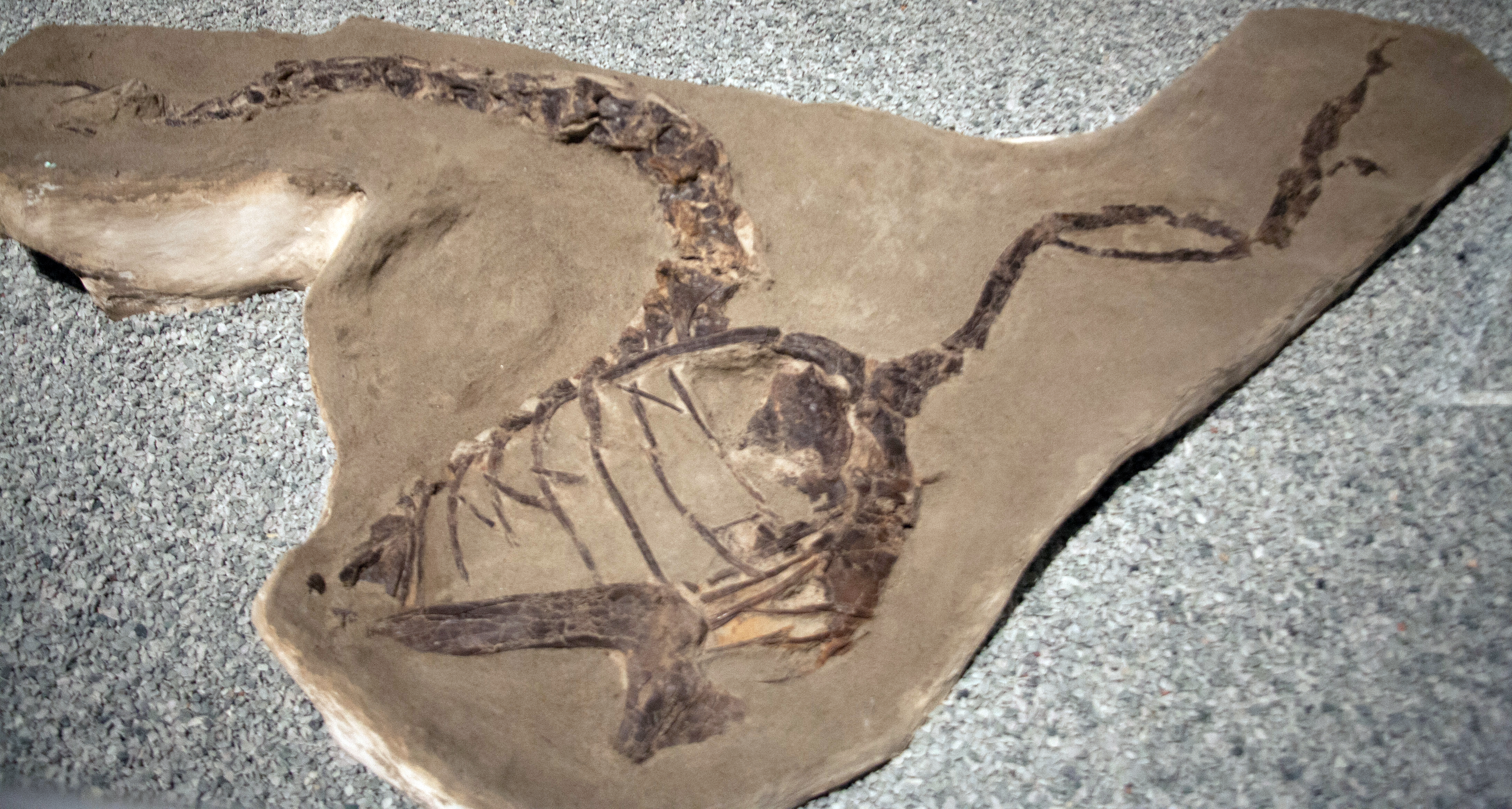
- Holotype fossil at Royal Tyrrell Museum

Scientific classification
- Kingdom: Animalia
- Phylum: Chordata
- Class: Reptilia
- Clade: Dinosauria
- Clade: Saurischia
- Clade: Theropoda
- Family: †Caenagnathidae
- Genus: †Apatoraptor; Funston & Currie, 2016
- Species: †A. pennatus

Binomial name
- †Apatoraptor pennatus Funston & Currie, 2016

= Apatoraptor =

Apatoraptor Temporal range: Campanian ~74 Ma

Extinct genus of dinosaurs

Apatoraptor (meaning "deceptive thief") is a genus of caenagnathid dinosaur which contains a single species, A. pennatus. The only known specimen was discovered in the Campanian-aged Horseshoe Canyon Formation of Alberta.

== Discovery ==
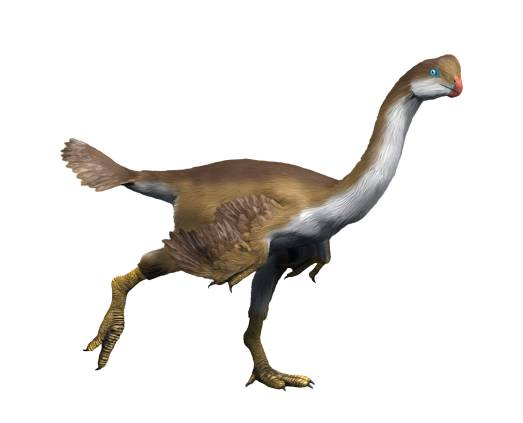
Life reconstruction of Apatoraptor pennatus

In 1993, at Drumheller in Alberta, three kilometres west of the Royal Tyrrell Museum of Palaeontology, a skeleton was found of a theropod. As it was initially identified as some unimportant ornithomimid specimen, preparation only started in 2002 and was almost immediately discontinued when no skull was thought to be present, the fossil again being covered in plaster. In 2008, research was resumed, and only then was it discovered that the fossil represented a species new to science.

In 2016, the type species Apatoraptor pennatus was named and described by Gregory F. Funston and Philip John Currie. The generic name is derived from the Greek goddess of deceit, Apatè, and Latin raptor, "robber", in reference to the specimen hiding its true identity for many years. The specific name means "feathered" in Latin, referring to the find of quill knobs on the ulna, showing the animal had wings.

The holotype TMP 1993.051.0001 was found in a layer of the Horsethief Member of the Horseshoe Canyon Formation dating from the Campanian. It consists of a partial skeleton with skull. The fossil was largely found articulated. It contains a palatine bone, the lower jaws, a hyoid, a complete series of neck and back vertebrae, ribs, the right shoulder girdle, the right arm, a sternum, belly ribs, a right ilium, a right thighbone, a right shinbone and a right calfbone. It was further investigated by means of a CAT-scan.

== Classification ==
Apatoraptor was, within the Oviraptorosauria, placed in the Caenagnathidae, in a derived position as a possible sister species of Elmisaurus.

== See also ==
- Timeline of oviraptorosaur research
- 2016 in paleontology
