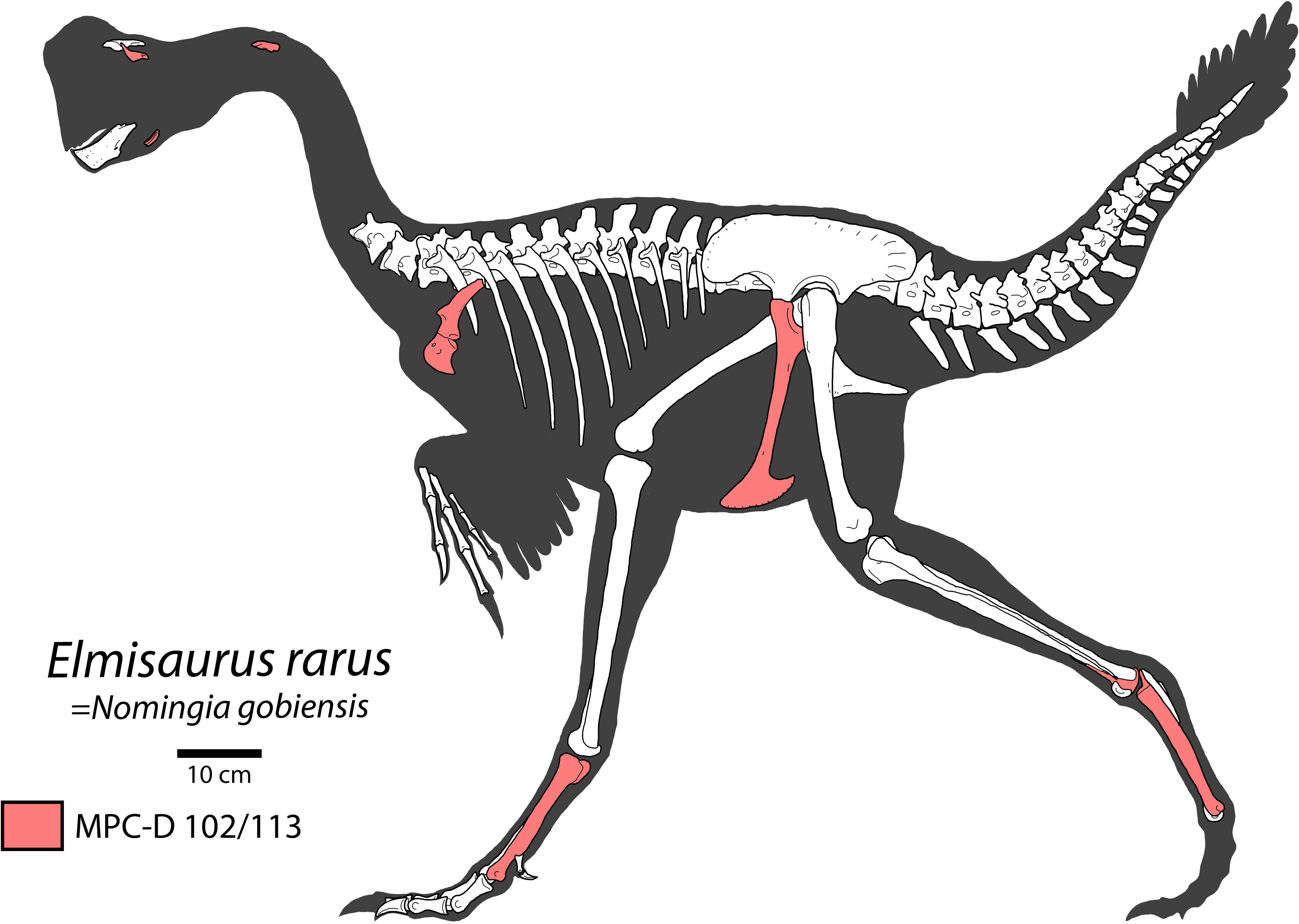
- Skeletal restoration showing known elements (including those of Nomingia)

Scientific classification
- Kingdom: Animalia
- Phylum: Chordata
- Class: Reptilia
- Clade: Dinosauria
- Clade: Saurischia
- Clade: Theropoda
- Family: †Caenagnathidae
- Subfamily: †Elmisaurinae
- Genus: †Elmisaurus; Osmólska, 1981
- Species: †E. rarus

Binomial name
- †Elmisaurus rarus Osmólska, 1981

Synonyms
- Chirostenotes rarus (Osmólska, 1981); Nomingia gobiensis? Barsbold et al., 2000

= Elmisaurus =

Elmisaurus Temporal range: Late Cretaceous, 70 Ma

Extinct genus of dinosaurs

Elmisaurus (meaning "foot sole lizard") is an extinct genus of caenagnathid theropod dinosaur from the Late Cretaceous Nemegt Formation of Mongolia.

== Discovery ==
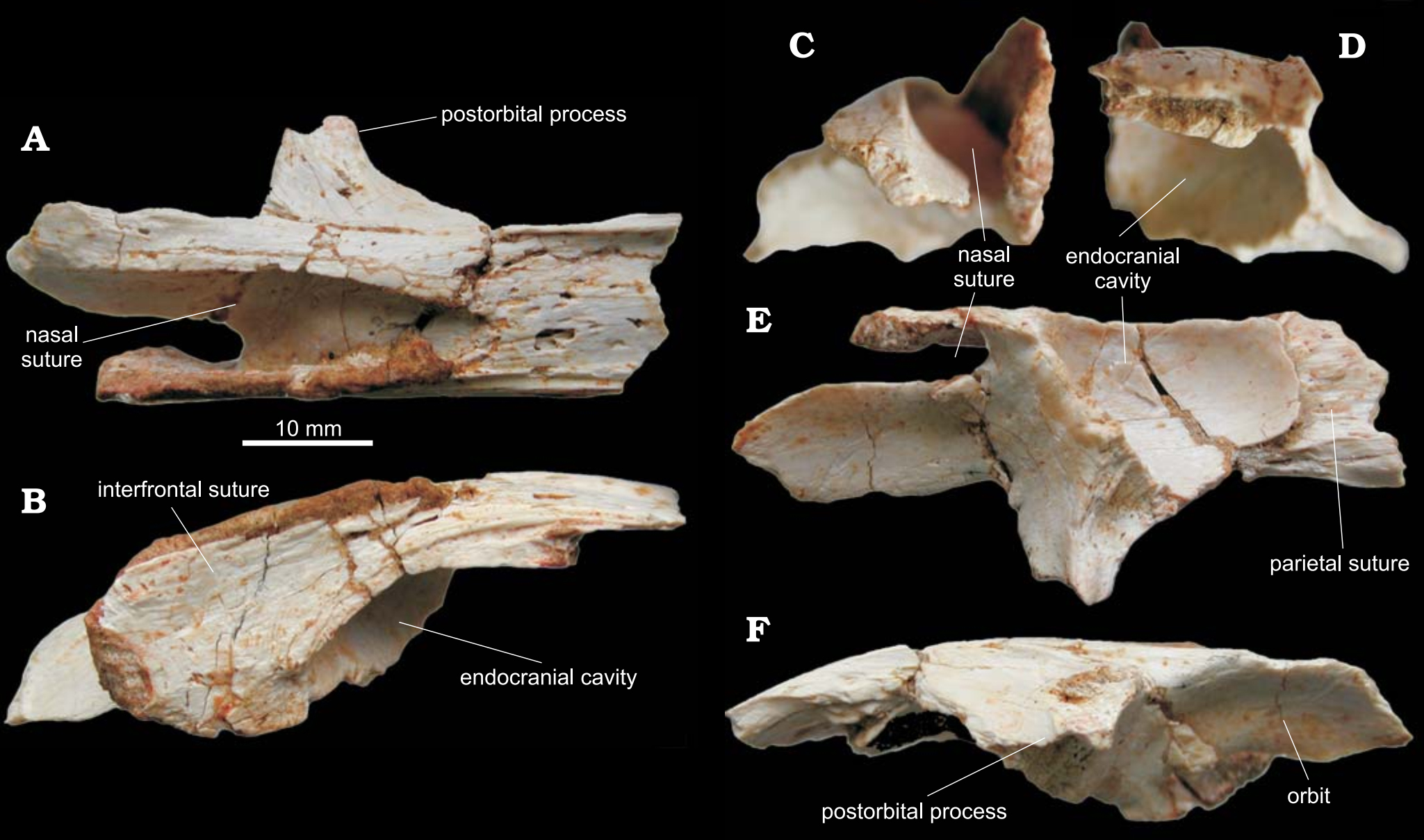
Frontal bone, indicating the presence of a crest

In 1970, a paleontological Polish-Mongolian expedition discovered two fragmentary specimens of a small theropod in the Ömnögovĭ province of Mongolia. The type species, Elmisaurus rarus, was named and described by Halszka Osmólska in 1981. The generic name is derived from Mongol elmyi or ölmyi, "foot sole", as the type specimen consisted of a metatarsus. The specific name means "rare" in Latin. The holotype, ZPAL MgD-I/172, consists of a left metatarsus fused with the tarsalia. There are two paratypes: ZPAL MgD-I/98, consisting of a right hand and foot, and ZPAL MgD-I/20, the upper part of the left metatarsus of a larger individual.

In a 2001 study conducted by Bruce Rothschild and other paleontologists, 23 foot bones referred to Elmisaurus were examined for signs of stress fracture, but none were found.

A second species, E. elegans, was named in 1989 by Philip J. Currie. This represented a North American form originally described as a species of Ornithomimus by William Arthur Parks in 1933, based on specimen ROM 781, a foot. Currie also referred the material of the American form Caenagnathus sternbergi, based on a jaw fragment, to Elmisaurus elegans. Due to their poor preservation and geographical distance from the type species, the classification of the American forms has been contentious. In 1997, Hans-Dieter Sues stated that this supposed second species of Elmisaurus should be referred to Chirostenotes, as C. elegans, though this position was not accepted by Currie. Other researchers, including Teresa Maryańska, Halszka Osmólska, and their colleagues, followed Sues in reassigning E. elegans to Chirostenotes. In 2020, Gregory Funston assigned the material to the new genus and species Citipes.

A 2021 article by Funston and colleagues suggested Nomingia is a synonym of Elmisaurus.

== Classification ==
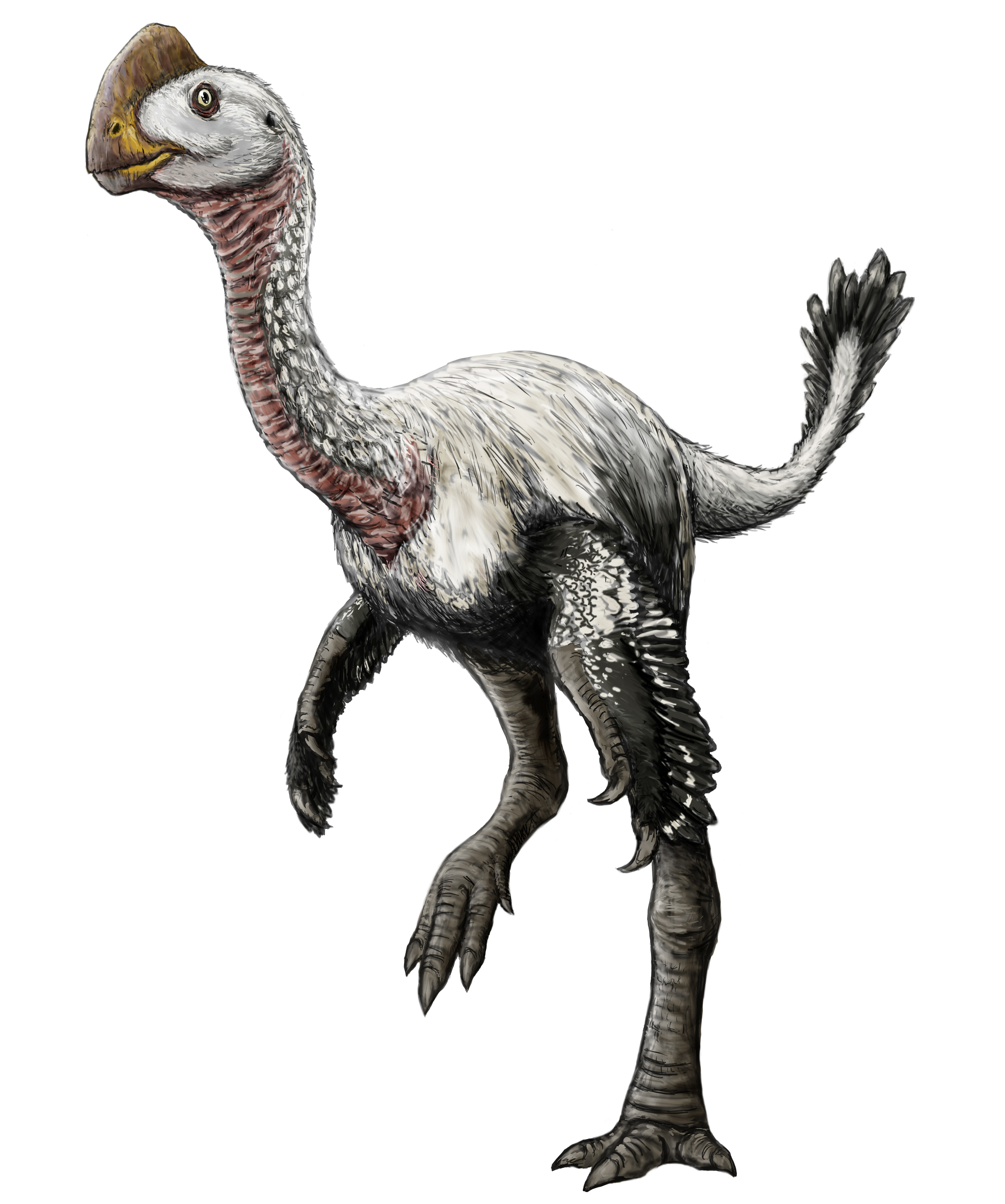
Life restoration

The cladogram below follows an analysis by Longrich et al. in 2013, which found Elmisaurus to be a caenagnathid.

- Caenagnathidae
  - Microvenator celer
  - unnamed
    - Gigantoraptor erlianensis
    - unnamed
      - Caenagnathasia martinsoni
      - Elmisaurus rarus
      - Caenagnathinae
        - Citipes elegans
        - Leptorhynchos gaddisi
        - Hagryphus giganteus
        - unnamed
          - Chirostenotes pergracilis
          - - Caenagnathus collinsi
            - Anzu wyliei

== See also ==
- Timeline of oviraptorosaur research
