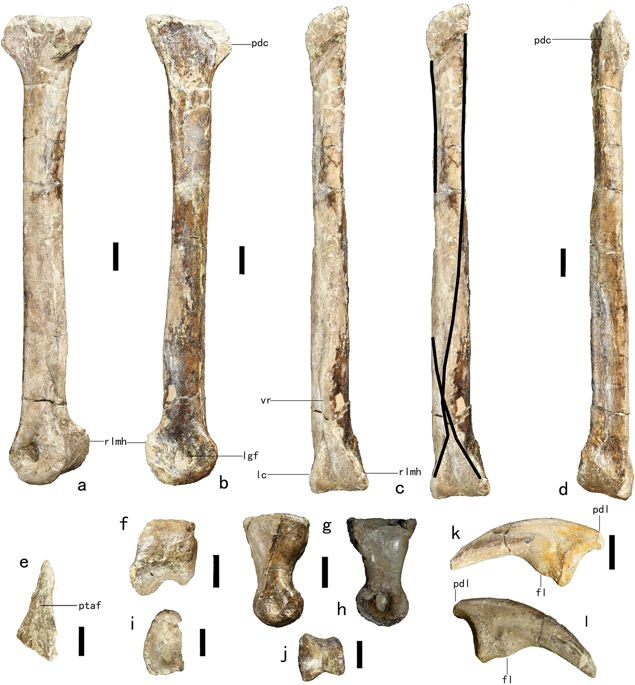
- Pedal elements

Scientific classification
- Kingdom: Animalia
- Phylum: Chordata
- Class: Reptilia
- Clade: Dinosauria
- Clade: Saurischia
- Clade: Theropoda
- Family: †Caenagnathidae
- Genus: †Anomalipes; Yu et al., 2018

Type species
- Anomalipes zhaoi Yu et al., 2018

= Anomalipes =

Anomalipes Temporal range: Late Cretaceous, 77.3–73.5 Ma

Genus of oviraptorosaurian dinosaurs

Anomalipes (meaning "unusual foot") is an extinct genus of caenagnathid oviraptorosaurian dinosaurs known from the Late Cretaceous (Campanian age) Wangshi Group of China. The genus contains a single species, Anomalipes zhaoi, known from a partial hindlimb.

== Discovery and naming ==
The remains of Anomalipes were discovered within a Shantungosaurus bonebed at the Kugou locality. The holotype (ZCDM V0020, housed at Zhucheng Dinosaur Museum, Zhucheng, Shandong) is an incomplete left hind-limb, including a partial left thigh, shin and shank, a complete metatarsal III and two toe bones.

The genus name Anomalipes is derived from the Latin anomalus (peculiar, abnormal, not easily classified) and pes (foot), referring to the unusual shape of its foot. The specific name, zhaoi, was named in honour of Zhao Xijin.

== See also ==
- 2018 in archosaur paleontology
- Timeline of oviraptorosaur research
