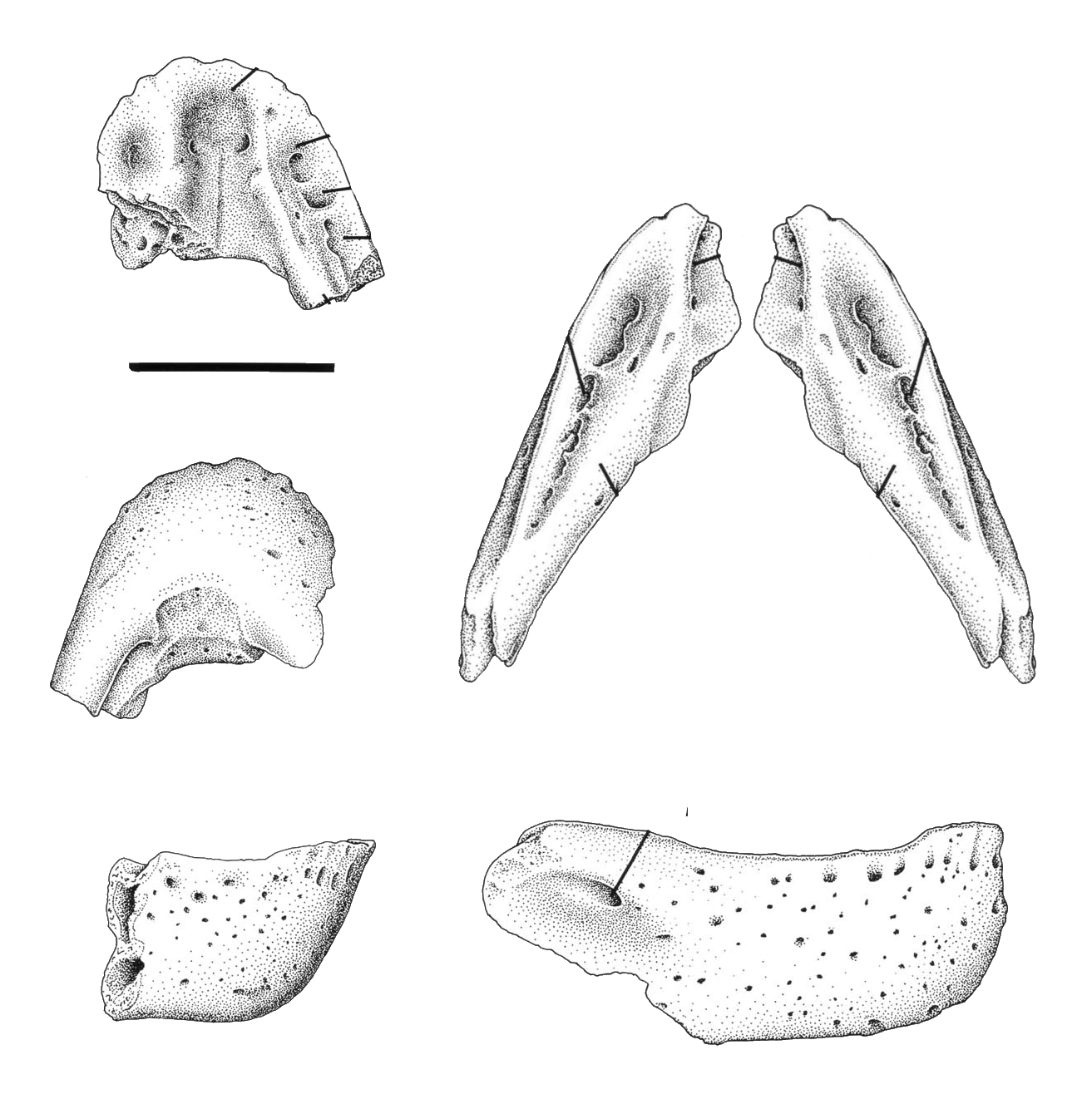
- Illustration of the lower jaw

Scientific classification
- Kingdom: Animalia
- Phylum: Chordata
- Class: Reptilia
- Clade: Dinosauria
- Clade: Saurischia
- Clade: Theropoda
- Family: †Caenagnathidae
- Subfamily: †Elmisaurinae
- Genus: †Caenagnathasia; Currie et al., 1994
- Species: †C. martinsoni

Binomial name
- †Caenagnathasia martinsoni Currie et al., 1994

= Caenagnathasia =

Caenagnathasia Temporal range: Turonian-Maastrichtian, 93–70.6 Ma

Extinct species of reptile

Caenagnathasia ('recent jaw from Asia') is a genus of small caenagnathid oviraptorosaurian theropod from the Late Cretaceous of Uzbekistan.

== Discovery ==
The type species Caenagnathasia martinsoni was named and described in 1994 by Philip J. Currie, Stephen Godfrey and Lev Nessov. The generic name is a combination of a reference to the species' placement in the Caenagnathidae, with Asia, the continent of its provenance. The specific name honours Gerbert Genrikhovich Martinson. The genus is based on holotype N 401/12457, a pair of fused dentaries of the lower jaws. The specimen was found near Dzharakuduk in layers of the Bissekty Formation, dating to the Turonian-Coniacian, around 90 mya, making it the oldest known caenagnathoid. A second specimen was referred to the species, N 402/12457, a right dentary of a slightly smaller individual. Both individuals were adult. In 2015, new material of Caenagnathasia was described. From the same site as the holotype, the material includes various vertebrae, a dentary, and a femur.

== Description ==
Caenagnathasia is the smallest known oviraptorosaur and one of the smallest non-avian dinosaurs. The jaw fragments are only a few centimetres long and total skull length has been estimated at 3 inches (7.6 cm). A 2010 estimate by Gregory S. Paul gave it a length of 2 feet (0.61 m) and a weight of 3 pounds (1.4 kg). Caenagnathasia would presumably have resembled other oviraptorosaurs, which were feathered, bird-like dinosaurs with beaked skulls, long necks, and long limbs. Recent studies suggest it was one of the more primitive members of the Caenagnathidae.

== Classification ==
Caenagnathasia was originally assigned to the Caenagnathidae. It was even included in the definition of that clade published by Hans-Dieter Sues. It has been suggested however, that it might have a more basal position in the Oviraptorosauria, outside of the Caenagnathoidea. In 2015 after the description of new material, it was found that Caenagnathasia could confidently be referred to Caenagnathidae.

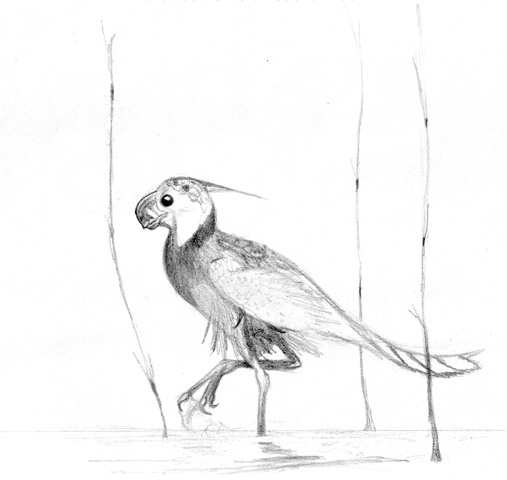
Life restoration with purely hypothetical ecology

The below cladogram is based on that resolved in the description of Anzu.

- Caenagnathoidea
  - Caenagnathidae
    - Microvenator celer
    - - Gigantoraptor erlianensis
      - - Caenagnathasia martinsoni
        - - Alberta dentary morph 3
          - Leptorhynchos gaddisi
          - - "Caenagnathus" sternbergi
            - - Anzu wyliei
              - Caenagnathus collinsi
  - Oviraptoridae

== See also ==
- Timeline of oviraptorosaur research
