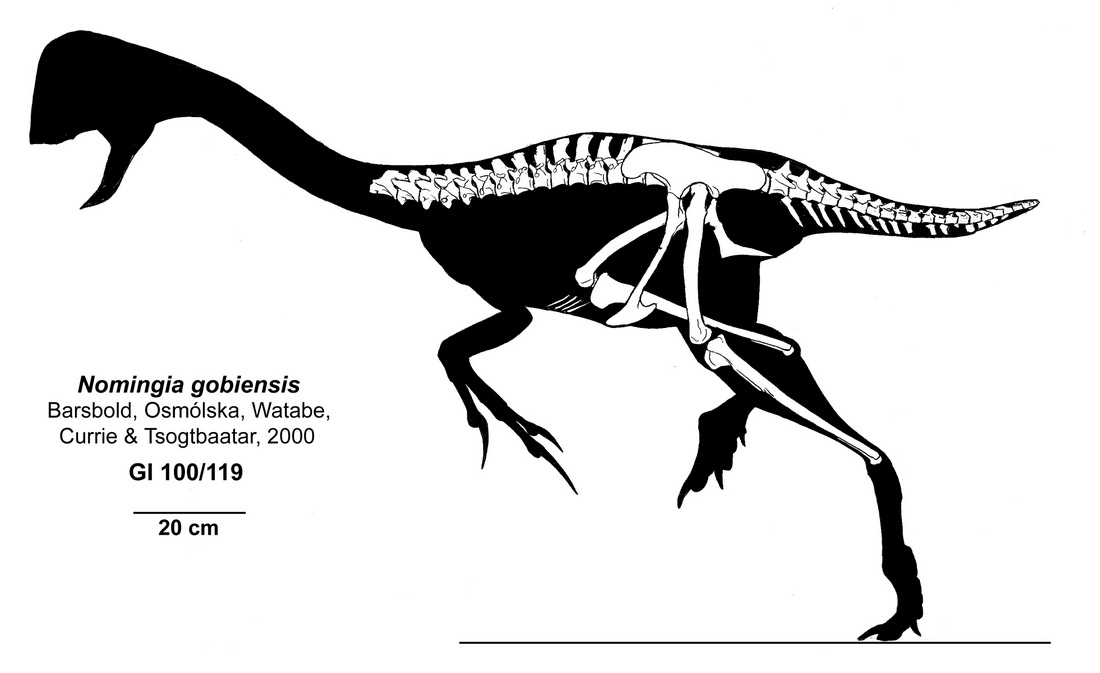
- Diagram showing known elements

Scientific classification
- Kingdom: Animalia
- Phylum: Chordata
- Class: Reptilia
- Clade: Dinosauria
- Clade: Saurischia
- Clade: Theropoda
- Family: †Caenagnathidae
- Genus: †Nomingia; Barsbold et al. 2000

Species
- N. gobiensis Barsbold et al., 2000 (type)

= Nomingia =

Nomingia Temporal range: Late Cretaceous, 70 Ma

Extinct genus of dinosaurs

Nomingia is a genus of oviraptorosaurian theropod dinosaur known from the Late Cretaceous Bugin Tsav Beds of Mongolia.

== Discovery and naming ==
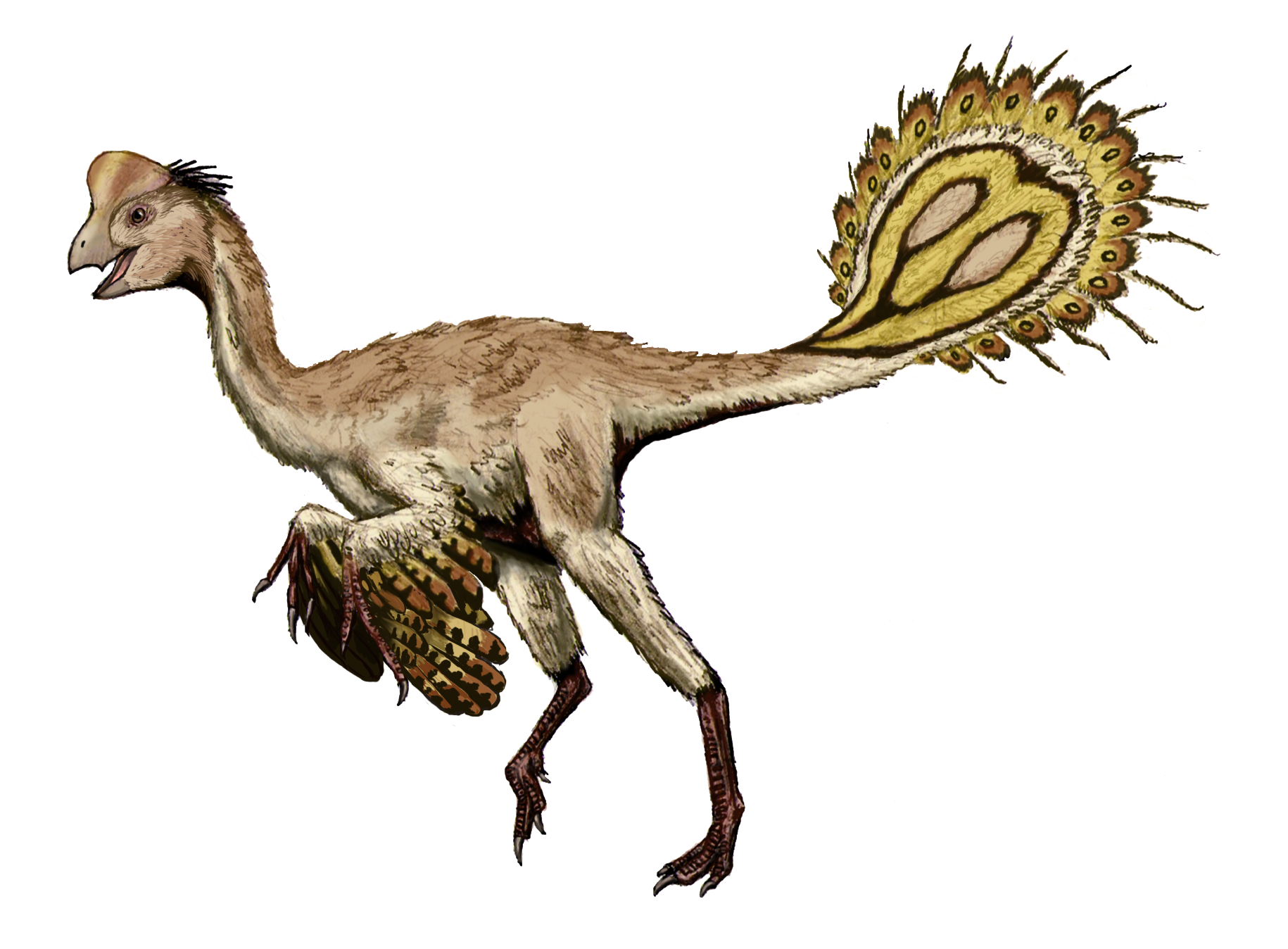
Restoration with hypothetical head, arms, and feet

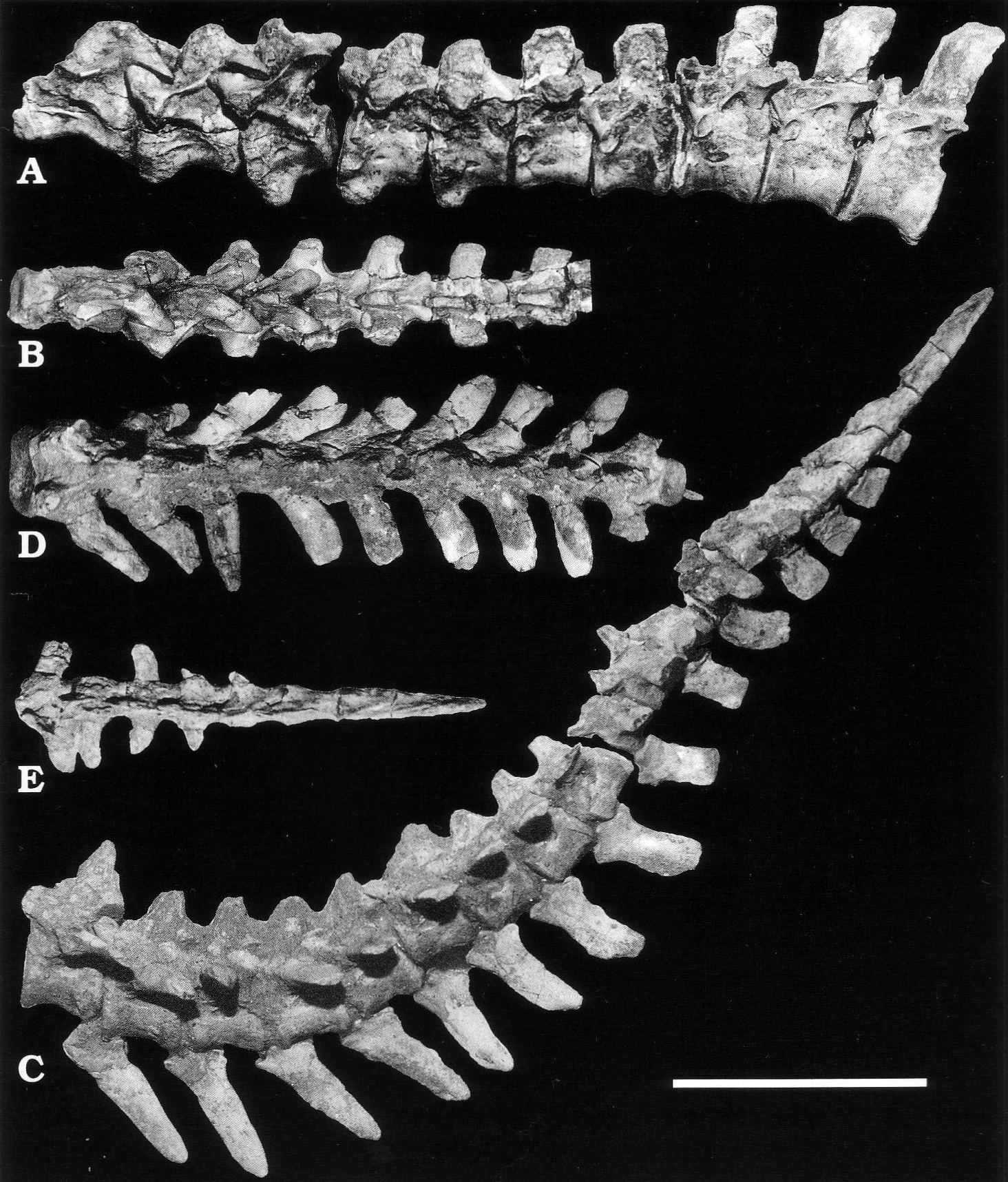
Vertebrae and tail of the holotype specimen

The remains, consisting of most of the vertebral column, pelvic girdle and left tibio-tarsus, holotype GIN 100/119, were found in 1994 in layers of the Nemegt Svita, dating to the Maastrichtian. They were named and described as the type species Nomingia gobiensis by Barsbold, Halszka Osmólska, Mahito Watabe, Philip Currie and Khishigjaw Tsogtbaatar in 2000. The etymology of the binomial refers to the location where the fossils were found, with the generic name mentioning the Nomingiin Gobi (Mongolian: Номингийн говь), one of the "Thirty-Three Gobis" which compose the Gobi Desert, which is itself mentioned in the specific descriptor.

A 2021 article by Funston and colleagues suggested Nomingia is a synonym of Elmisaurus.

== Description ==
Nomingia is a medium-sized oviraptorosaur, estimated by Gregory S. Paul to have been 1.7 metres (5.6 ft) long and 20 kilograms (44 lb) in weight. It is characterized by a pygostyle-like mass of five fused vertebrae at the tail end, which Barsbold et al. inferred probably supported a feather fan as in Caudipteryx. A similar bone structure had only been found in birds before this fossil was discovered.

As other oviraptorids such as Chirostenotes, N. gobiensis would have been a medium-sized theropod sporting beaked jaws and, probably, a crest used for display.

== Phylogeny ==
Barsbold et al. only formally assigned Nomingia to a more general Oviraptorosauria, though they considered that it was likely a member of the Caenagnathidae (=Elmisaurinae). Subsequent cladistic analyses have been contradictory regarding to which precise subgroup it belonged.

== See also ==
- Timeline of oviraptorosaur research
