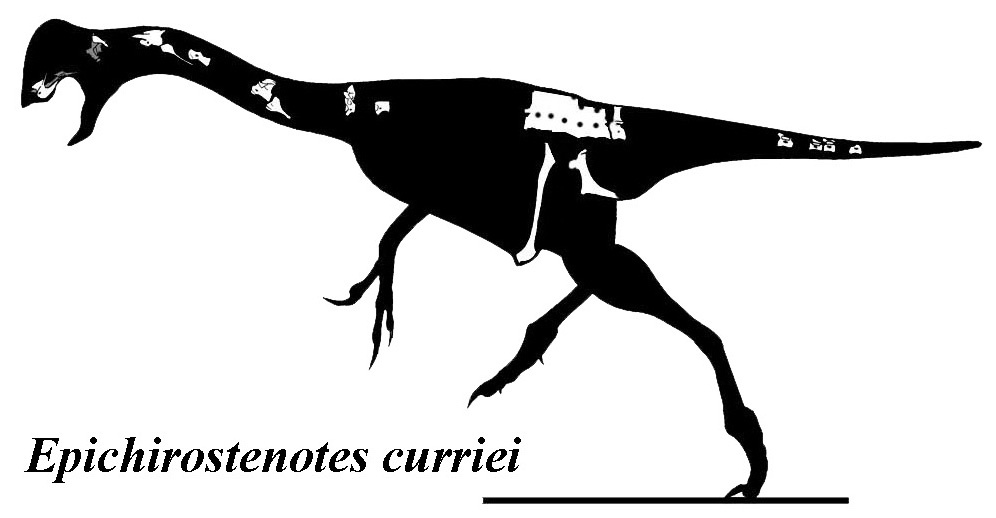
- Skeletal restoration

Scientific classification
- Kingdom: Animalia
- Phylum: Chordata
- Class: Reptilia
- Clade: Dinosauria
- Clade: Saurischia
- Clade: Theropoda
- Family: †Caenagnathidae
- Subfamily: †Caenagnathinae
- Genus: †Epichirostenotes; Sullivan, Jasinski & Van Tomme, 2011
- Species: †E. curriei

Binomial name
- †Epichirostenotes curriei Sullivan, Jasinski & Van Tomme, 2011

= Epichirostenotes =

Epichirostenotes Temporal range: Late Cretaceous, 72 Ma

Extinct genus of dinosaurs

Epichirostenotes (meaning "above Chirostenotes", because it lived after the latter genus) is an extinct monotypic genus of oviraptorosaurian dinosaur that lived during the Maastrichtian stage of the Late Cretaceous epoch of Alberta.

== Discovery ==
Epichirostenotes is known from an incomplete skeleton found in 1923 at the Horseshoe Canyon Formation, in strata dated to about 72 million years ago. It was first named by Robert M. Sullivan, Steven E. Jasinski and Mark P. A. van Tomme in 2011 and the type species is Epichirostenotes curriei. Its holotype, ROM 43250, had been assigned to Chirostenotes pergracilis by Hans-Dieter Sues in 1997.

== Description ==
E. curriei exhibited pronounced twisting of the common crus, and it showed an expanded anterior semicircular canal. Its posterior canal and lateral canal in the inner ear showed an incipient division.

== See also ==
- Timeline of oviraptorosaur research
