= Yuanyanglong =

Yuanyanglong Temporal range: Early Cretaceous, ~Aptian–Albian
- Skeletal reconstruction including the holotype (white) and referred (orange) specimens

Scientific classification
- Kingdom: Animalia
- Phylum: Chordata
- Class: Reptilia
- Clade: Dinosauria
- Clade: Saurischia
- Clade: Theropoda
- Clade: †Oviraptorosauria
- Genus: †Yuanyanglong; Hao et al., 2025
- Species: †Y. bainian

Binomial name
- †Yuanyanglong bainian Hao et al., 2025

Genus of oviraptorosaurian dinosaurs

Yuanyanglong (meaning "lovebird dragon") is an extinct genus of oviraptorosaurian theropod dinosaurs from the Early Cretaceous Miaogou Formation of China. The genus contains a single species, Yuanyanglong bainian, known from two partial skeletons.

== Discovery and naming ==
The Yuanyanglong fossil material, was discovered in 2021 in sediments of the Miaogou Formation (Maortu locality) in the Gobi Desert of Chilantai, Inner Mongolia, China. Two incomplete skeletons were found in association on the same block, which are assumed to represent the same species based on comparable anatomy and body size. The holotype specimen, PV02476-1, consists of the pelvic girdle, the right hindlimb missing the foot, the pectoral girdle, the right forelimb missing the hand, several ribs, and dorsal and caudal vertebrae. The associated referred specimen, PV02476-2, includes an incomplete poorly-preserved skull, partial hindlimb without the foot, incomplete pelvis, several dorsal vertebrae, and a partial sacrum.

In 2024, Hao et al. announced Yuanyanglong bainian as a new genus and species of early oviraptorosaurs based on these fossil remains. The generic name, Yuanyanglong, combines yuanyang (鴛鴦), the Mandarin word for "lovebirds" (the mandarin duck), a species symbolic of mating for life with the Chinese word long, meaning "dragon". This name refers to the two discovered associated individuals. The specific name, bainian (百年), is a Chinese word meaning "a hundred years", commemorating the 100th anniversary of the first named oviraptorosaur taxa, Chirostenotes and Oviraptor, in March 1924 and November 1924, respectively. The final version of the article describing Yuanyanglong bainian was published the following year.

Yuanyanglong represents the first Early Cretaceous oviraptorosaur to be named from the Gobi Desert region, with other Gobi relatives coming from Late Cretaceous outcrops.

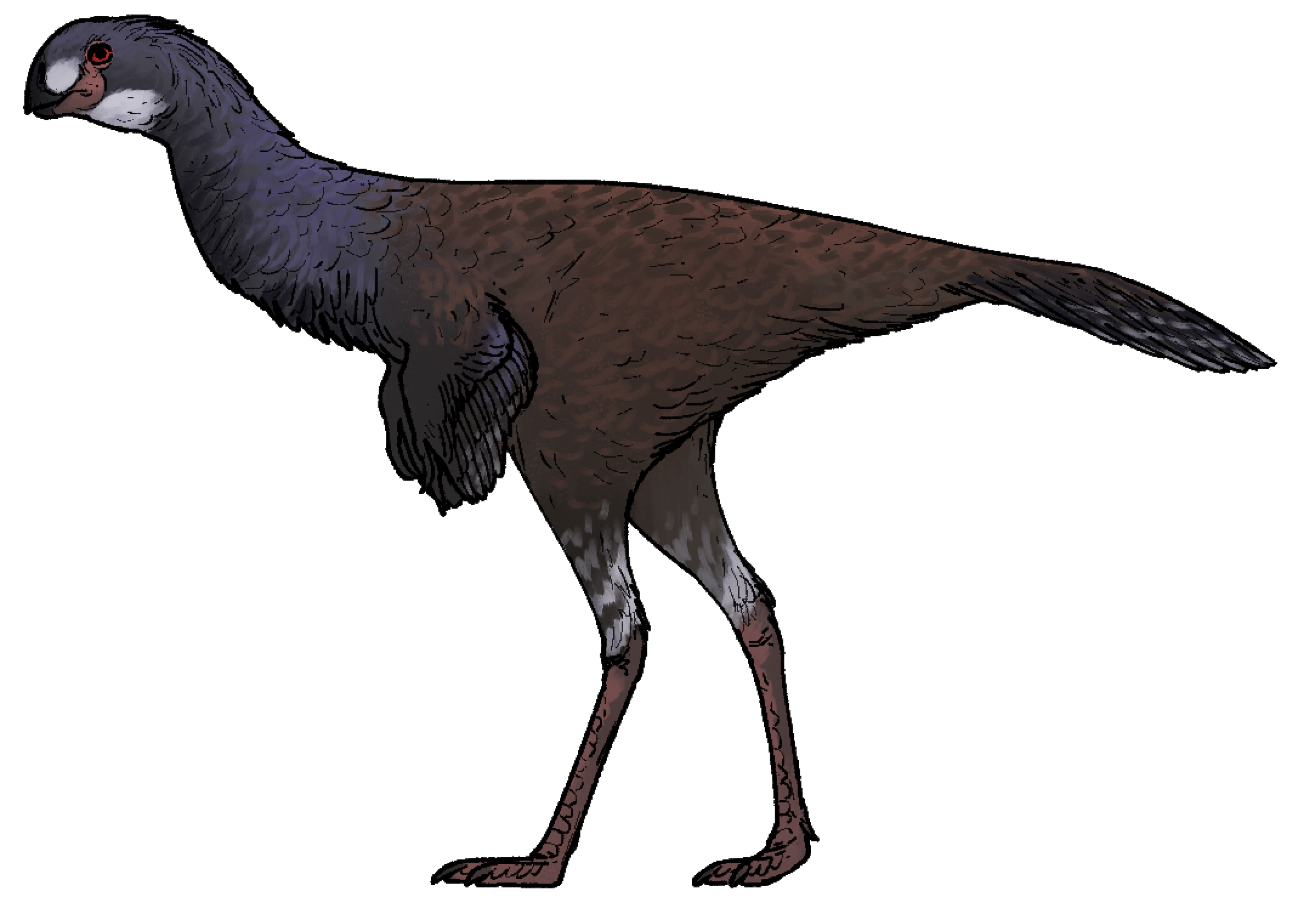
Speculative life restoration

== Classification ==
In their phylogenetic analyses, Hao et al. (2025) recovered Yuanyanglong as a basal member of the Oviraptorosauria, diverging after the Caudipteridae as the sister taxon to the Edentoraptora (Avimimidae [Avimimus spp.] + Caenagnathoidea). Their results are displayed in the cladogram below:

- Oviraptorosauria
  - Similicaudipteryx
  - - Luoyanggia
    - - Incisivosaurus
      - - Caudipteridae
          - Xingtianosaurus
          - - Caudipteryx dongi
            - Caudipteryx zoui
        - - Yuanyanglong
          - Edentoraptora
            - Avimimidae
              - Avimimus nemegtensis
              - Avimimus portentosus
            - Caenagnathoidea
              - Caenagnathidae
              - Oviraptoridae

== See also ==
- Timeline of oviraptorosaur research
- 2025 in archosaur paleontology
