= Miaogou Formation =

Early Cretaceous geological formation in China

- Stratigraphic range: late Early Cretaceous, ~Aptian–Albian
- Type: Geological formation
- Unit of: Yangtaiwatan Basin
- Underlies: Baiyanghe Formation

Lithology
- Primary: Sandstone, mudstone, muddy limestone and sandy conglomerate

Location
- Coordinates: 40°12′N 105°44′E
- Region: Inner Mongolia
- Country: China
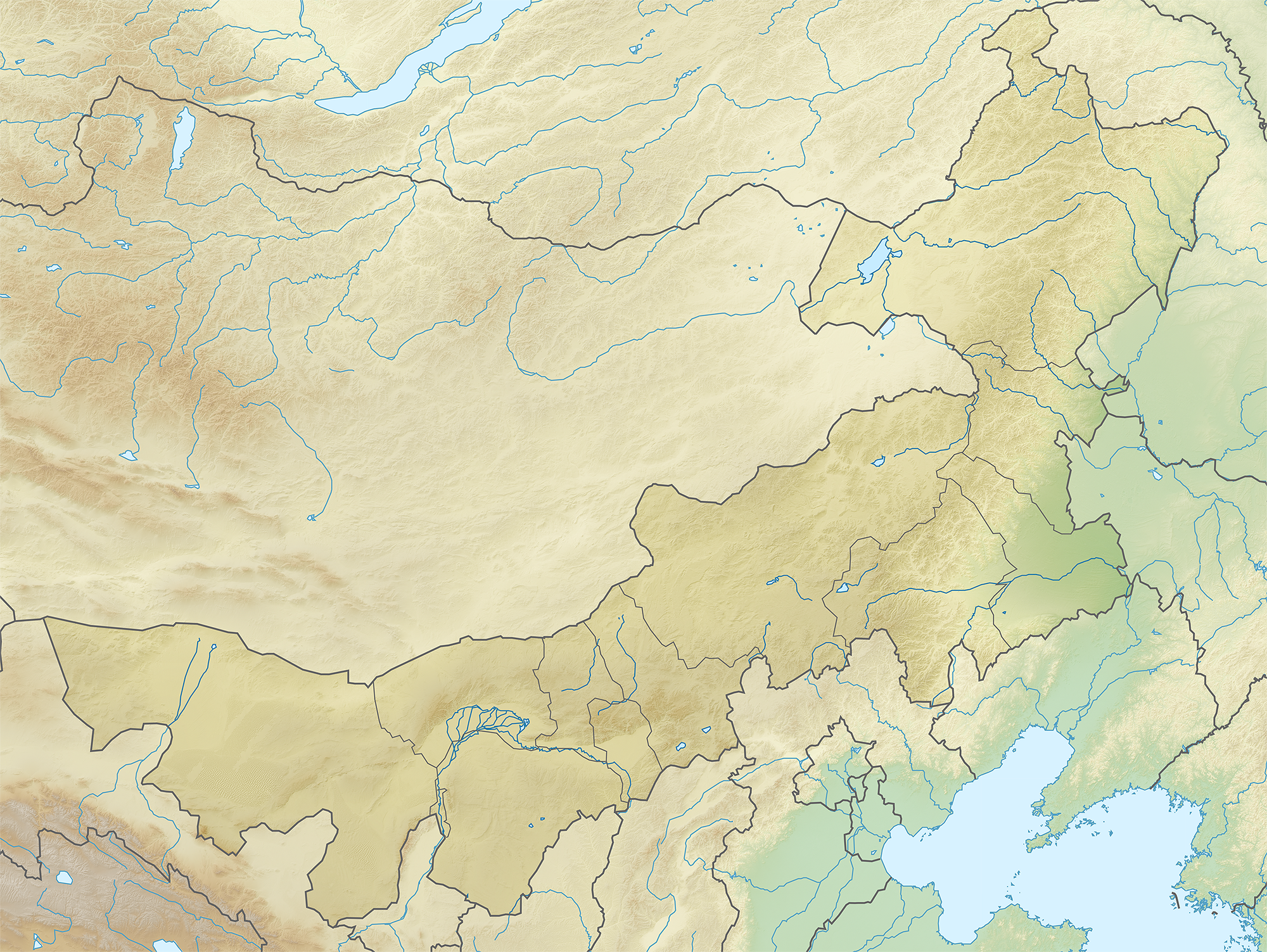
- Miaogou Formation (China) Miaogou Formation (Inner Mongolia)

The Miaogou Formation is a geological formation in Inner Mongolia, north China. While its absolute age is uncertain, it has been estimated to represent Early Cretaceous sediments based on the faunal composition. Dinosaur remains are among the fossils that have been recovered from the formation.

== History and geology ==
The primary fossil-producing outcrop of the Miaogou Formation is the Maortu locality, which was discovered in 1959 by a joint expedition of Chinese and Russian paleontologists. Initial reports of the locality's fauna incorrectly assigned the fossils to either the Ulansuhai or Dashuigou formations, but a later discussion corrected this.

While the Miaogou Formation has not been absolutely dated, estimates based on charophytan, stratigraphic, and sedimentological studies have proposed a Barremian–Albian age range. However, a more narrow range (around Aptian-Albian) is implied based on the fossil animals found in the formation, which are inconsistent with Chinese Barremian faunas such as those associated with the Jehol Biota.

== Paleoenvironment ==
Analysis of the formation's geology indicates that it represents a hot, humid environment with large lake systems. The formation's lower member preserves alluvial fan to braided stream deposits, while the upper member preserves meandering stream and lacustrine deposits.

== Fossil content ==
Color key: Taxon / Reclassified taxon / Taxon falsely reported as present / Dubious taxon or junior synonym / Ichnotaxon / Ootaxon / Morphotaxon	Notes; Uncertain or tentative taxa are in small text; ~~crossed out~~ taxa are discredited.

=== Dinosaurs ===
Genus	Species	Region	Material	Notes	Images
Gobisaurus	G. domoculus	Maortu locality, Chilantai	A skull, with undescribed postcranial remains belonging to the same individual	An ankylosaurid closely related to Shamosaurus; originally interpreted as from the nearby Ulansuhai Formation	
Probactrosaurus	P. gobiensis	Maortu locality, Chilantai	Partial skulls and skeletons	A hadrosauroid ornithopod; originally interpreted as from the nearby Dashuigou Formation	
Shaochilong	S. maortuensis	Maortu locality, Chilantai	Partial skull, axis, and caudal vertebrae	A tetanuran theropod, formerly "Chilantaisaurus" maortuensis; originally interpreted as from the nearby Ulansuhai Formation	
Yuanyanglong	Y. bainian	Maortu locality, Chilantai	Two associated partial skeletons of similarly sized individuals	A basal oviraptorosaurian theropod	

== See also ==
- List of stratigraphic units with few dinosaur genera
