= Sergei Kurzanov =

Russian paleontologist

Sergei Mikhailovich Kurzanov
- Born: 11 February 1947
- Died: 18 June 2024 (aged 77)
- Citizenship: Russia
- Scientific career
- Fields: Paleontology, Geology

Sergei Mikhailovich Kurzanov (Сергей Михайлович Курзанов; 11 February 1947 - 18 June 2024) was a Russian (formerly Soviet) paleontologist at the Paleontological Institute of the Russian Academy of Sciences. He is known mainly for his work in Mongolia and the ex-Soviet republics in Central Asia. In 1976, he announced the discovery of Alioramus. In 1981, he announced the discovery of Avimimus.

In 1998 a species of iguanodont dinosaur from Mongolia was named Altirhinus kurzanovi in his honor.
