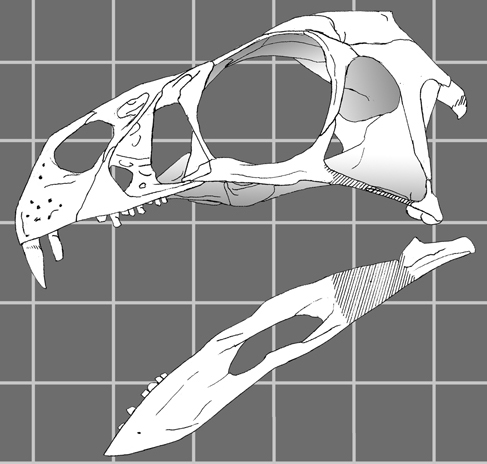
- Restoration of the skull

Scientific classification
- Kingdom: Animalia
- Phylum: Chordata
- Class: Reptilia
- Clade: Dinosauria
- Clade: Saurischia
- Clade: Theropoda
- Clade: †Oviraptorosauria
- Genus: †Incisivosaurus; Xu et al. 2002

Type species
- Incisivosaurus gauthieri Xu et al. 2002

= Incisivosaurus =

Incisivosaurus Temporal range: Barremian ~126–124 Ma

Extinct genus of dinosaurs

Incisivosaurus ("incisor lizard") is a genus of small, probably herbivorous theropod dinosaurs from the early Cretaceous Period of what is now the People's Republic of China. The first specimen to be described (by Xu et al. in 2002), IVPP V13326, is a skull that was collected from the lowermost levels (the fluvial Lujiatun beds) of the Yixian Formation (dating to the Barremian stage about 126 million years ago) in the Sihetun area, near Beipiao City, in western Liaoning Province. The most significant, and highly unusual, characteristic of this dinosaur is its apparent adaptation to an herbivorous or omnivorous lifestyle. It was named for its prominent, rodent-like front teeth, which show wear patterns commonly found in plant-eating dinosaurs. The specific name gauthieri honors Dr. Jacques Gauthier, a pioneer of the phylogenetic method of classification.

== Description ==
The initial description of Incisivosaurus by Xu et al. showed that the skull, which measures approximately 10 cm (3.9 in) in length, preserves the most complete dentition known for any oviraptorosaurian. Their cladistic analysis indicated that Incisivosaurus lies at the base of the oviraptorosaurian group, making it more primitive than Caudipteryx and the oviraptorids. A subsequent study by Osmolska et al. in 2004 described the distinguishing skeletal features of Incisivosaurus, including a long snout that made up about half the total length of the skull, a slender lower jaw with a long fenestra (opening), and its distinctive, large, flattened front teeth. In addition to these unique features, Incisivosaurus shared many traits with more typical oviraptorosaurs, allowing its classification with that group. Several features, including its numerous teeth (most advanced oviraptorids were toothless), show that it was a primitive member of the group, and several features of the skull even support a relationship with the therizinosaurs, another theropod group that was probably herbivorous.

In 2009 the holotype skull was scanned and analyzed in three dimensions. The results indicated that Incisivosaurus had less birdlike air spaces in the skull bones than later oviraptorosaurs did. It also found that Incisivosaurus had reduced olfactory lobes and expanded optic lobes similar to ornithomimosaurs. It suggested that the most birdlike features of oviraptorosaurs may have been convergent with birds.

=== Feathered juvenile specimens ===
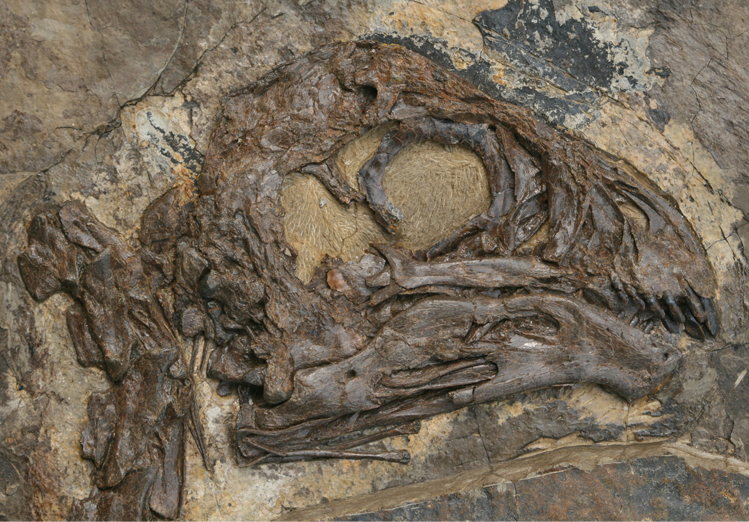
Skull of specimen STM22-6

In 2010, two feathered oviraptorosaur specimens were described, both of which preserved feather traces. These specimens (both juveniles, though one closer to maturity than the other) showed that the feathers were similar to the related Caudipteryx, with long (symmetrical) vaned feathers on the hand and tail, and the rest of the body covered in simpler, downy feathers. Though initially interpreted as specimens of Similicaudipteryx, later research suggested that they could instead be referred to Incisivosaurus.

The nature of the feathers preserved in the two Yixian specimens appeared to Xu and colleagues, who described the two feathered specimens, to change with age. The youngest specimen had relatively short primary feathers (those anchored to the hand) compared to its tail feathers. In the older specimen, the primary feathers were the same length as the tail feathers, and secondary feathers (those anchored to the lower arm) were also present. The primary feathers may have grown more slowly than the tail feathers, not reaching equal size until the animal was close to maturity, and the secondary feathers would not appear at all until this more mature stage. This suggests that the wing feathers had little use at a young age, only becoming fully developed with maturity.

Additionally, the youngest specimen's vaned feathers appeared to lack barbs except at the tip, instead consisting of a solid sheet. Xu and colleagues interpreted the stark differences in the feathers of the two specimens as primarily age-related. They speculated that hatchlings would have been covered in natal down like modern birds. As the animal aged, the down would be replaced by vaned pennaceous feathers on the hands and tail, but ribbon-like and primitive in form, similar to the tail feathers of Confuciusornis, Epidexipteryx, and some enantiornithines. These feathers would be lost through moulting as the animal aged, and replaced with more modern-style barbed feathers. The primary feathers grew more slowly than the tail feathers, not reaching equal size until the animal was close to maturity, and the secondary feathers would not appear at all until this more mature stage. This suggests that the wing feathers had little use at a young age, only becoming fully developed with maturity.

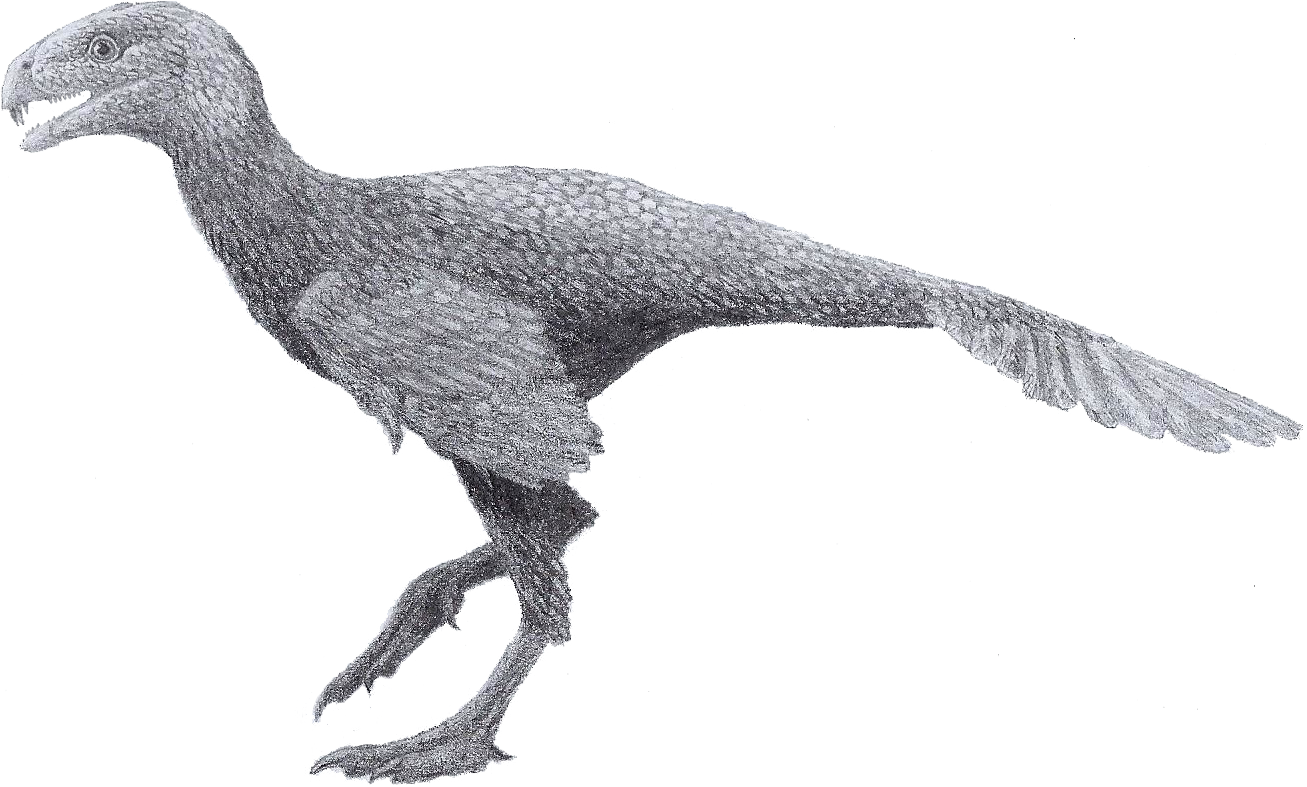
Life restoration of Incisivosaurus

However, feather development specialist Richard Prum disputed the above interpretation of the feathers in a November 2010 letter to the journal Nature. Prum noted that the apparently ribbon-like structure of the juvenile's feathers were consistent with pennaceous feathers in the midst of moulting. In modern birds, new vaned feathers emerge from the feather follicle enclosed in a "pin feather", a solid tube covered in keratin. Usually, the tip of this tube will fall away first, leaving a structure identical to that seen in the fossil. Later, the rest of the sheath falls away when the entire feather has fully developed. Prum also noted, as did Xu and his team, that the structure of the oviraptorosaur feathers is fundamentally different from other prehistoric birds with ribbon-like tail feathers. In those other species, the ribbon portion is formed from a flattened and expanded rachis, or central quill, of the feather, with the feather barbs expanding out at the tip. In the fossil specimen, however, the "ribbon" like portion is the same width as the vaned tip. This is consistent with what is seen in feathers in the process of moulting. Prum concluded that rather than representing an instance of feathers changing in form as the animal aged, this specimen represents the first known fossil evidence of feather moulting.

Prum also noted that in modern birds, tail feathers moult sequentially, not simultaneously as in the oviraptorosaur specimen. However, the sequential moulting of modern birds is because the birds need to retain their ability to fly during the moult (except in penguins). For lineages more primitive than the advent of flight, like oviraptorosaurs, this would not have been an issue, and all the wing and tail feathers of primitive feathered theropods may have moulted simultaneously, more like penguins than flying birds.

However, Xu et al. (2010) rebutted that the purported moulting evidence is problematic due to the complete absence of previous-generation feathers, and suggested that the feather is too large to be considered as a "pin feather". Other authors agreed with the reply by Xu et al. (2010) that the structures do not represent the "pin feather", though they considered that the specimen might represent a mid to late immature stage.

== Classification ==
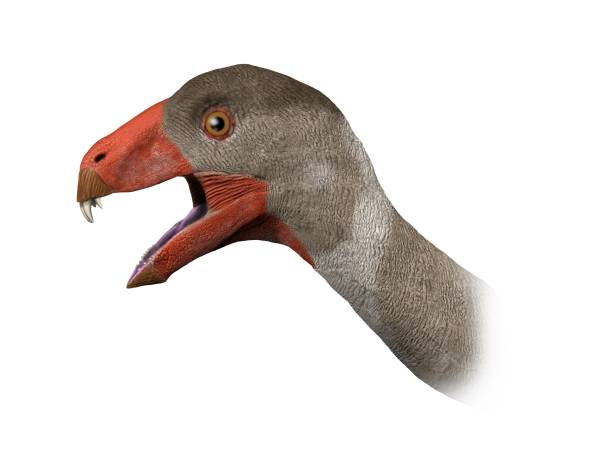
Life restoration

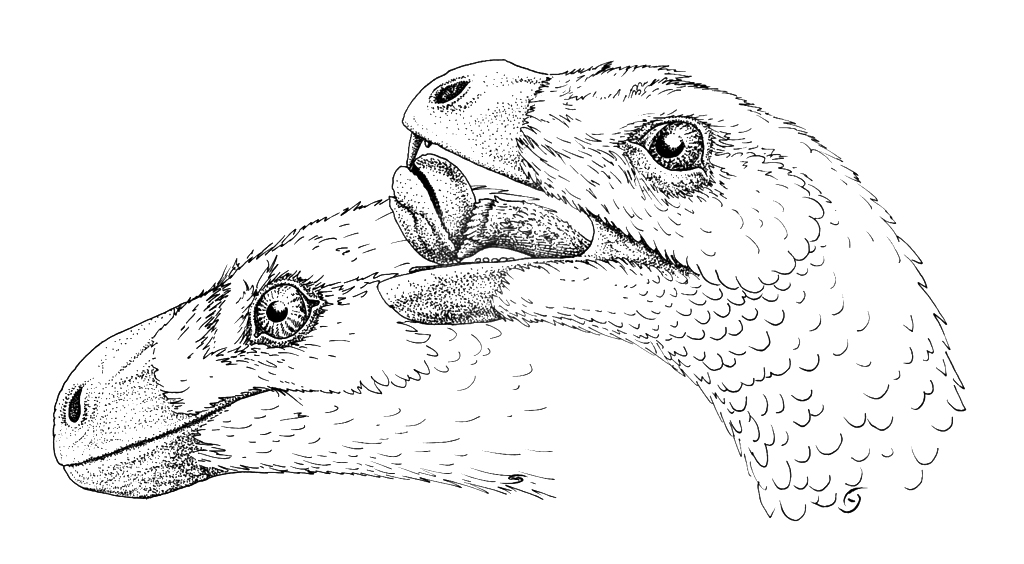
Restoration of head with speculative parrot-like tongue

Incisivosaurus, as well as its potential synonym Protarchaeopteryx, were included in the phylogenetic analysis of a 2014 study on the group Paraves and its relatives. In the unweight cladogram, Incisivosaurus was rendered as the sister taxon to Protarchaeopteryx, with their group being the most primitive oviraptorosaurians. In both weighted analyses however, Protarchaeopteryx was found to be the most primitive oviraptorosaurian, with Incisivosaurus as the next most basal. One of the weighted cladograms, using TNT, is shown below.

- Oviraptorosauria
  - Protarchaeopteryx
  - - Incisivosaurus
    - - Similicaudipteryx
      - - - Avimimus
          - Microvenator
        - - Caudipteryx
          - Caenagnathoidea
            - Caenagnathidae
              - Chirostenotes
              - Gigantoraptor
            - Oviraptoridae
              - Oviraptor
              - - Citipati
                - Khaan

== Paleobiology ==
A 2022 study of the bite force of Incisivosaurus and comparisons with other oviraptorosaurs such as Citipati, Khaan, and Conchoraptor suggests that Incisivosaurus had a very strong bite force similar to ornithomimosaurs 33 times its weight. The moderate jaw gape seen in oviraptorosaurs is indicative of herbivory, but it is clear they were feeding on much tougher vegetation than other herbivorous theropods in their environment, such as ornithomimosaurs and therizinosaurs. The examinations suggest oviraptorosaurs may have been powerful-biting generalists or specialists that partook of niche partitioning both in body size and jaw function.

== See also ==
- Timeline of oviraptorosaur research
