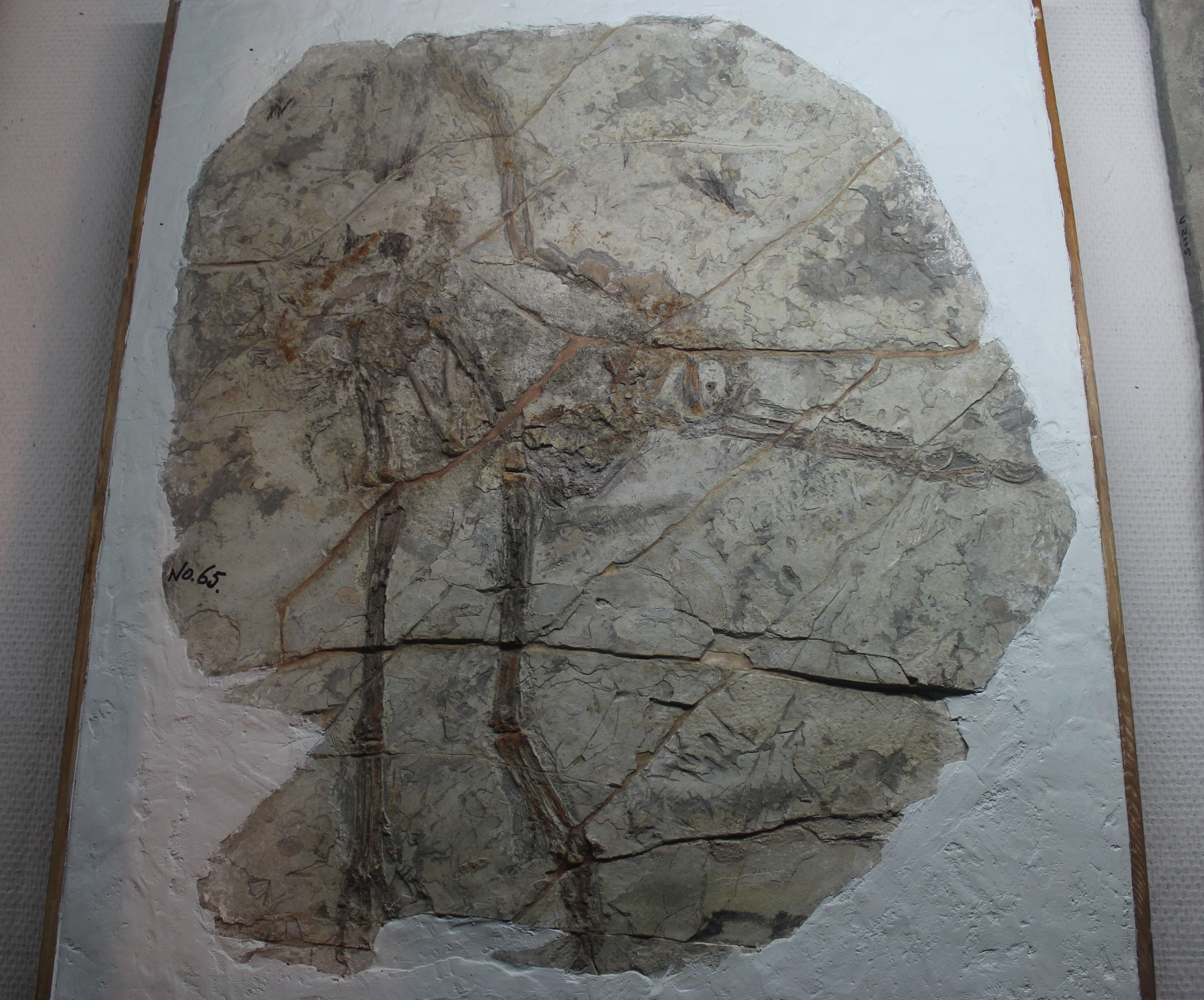
- Holotype, Geological Museum of China

Scientific classification
- Kingdom: Animalia
- Phylum: Chordata
- Class: Reptilia
- Clade: Dinosauria
- Clade: Saurischia
- Clade: Theropoda
- Clade: †Oviraptorosauria
- Genus: †Protarchaeopteryx; Q. Ji & S. Ji, 1997
- Species: †P. robusta

Binomial name
- †Protarchaeopteryx robusta Ji & Ji, 1997

= Protarchaeopteryx =

Protarchaeopteryx Temporal range: Early Cretaceous, 124.6 Ma

Extinct genus of dinosaurs

Protarchaeopteryx (meaning "before Archaeopteryx" although it is from the Cretaceous and Archaeopteryx is from the Jurassic) is a genus of turkey-sized feathered theropod dinosaur from China. Known from the Jianshangou bed of the Yixian Formation, it lived during the early Aptian age of the Early Cretaceous, approximately 124.6 million years ago. It was probably a herbivore or omnivore, although its hands were very similar to those of small carnivorous dinosaurs. It appears to be one of the most basal members of the Oviraptorosauria, closely related to Incisivosaurus, or a taxon slightly less closely related to birds than oviraptorosaurs were.

== Description ==
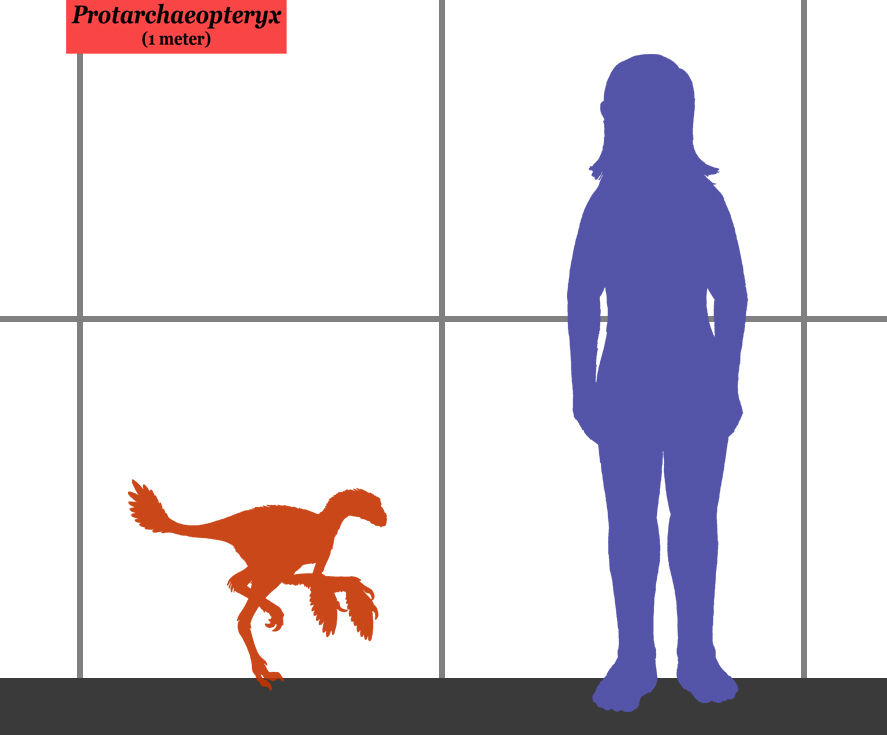
Protarchaeopteryx size, compared to a human

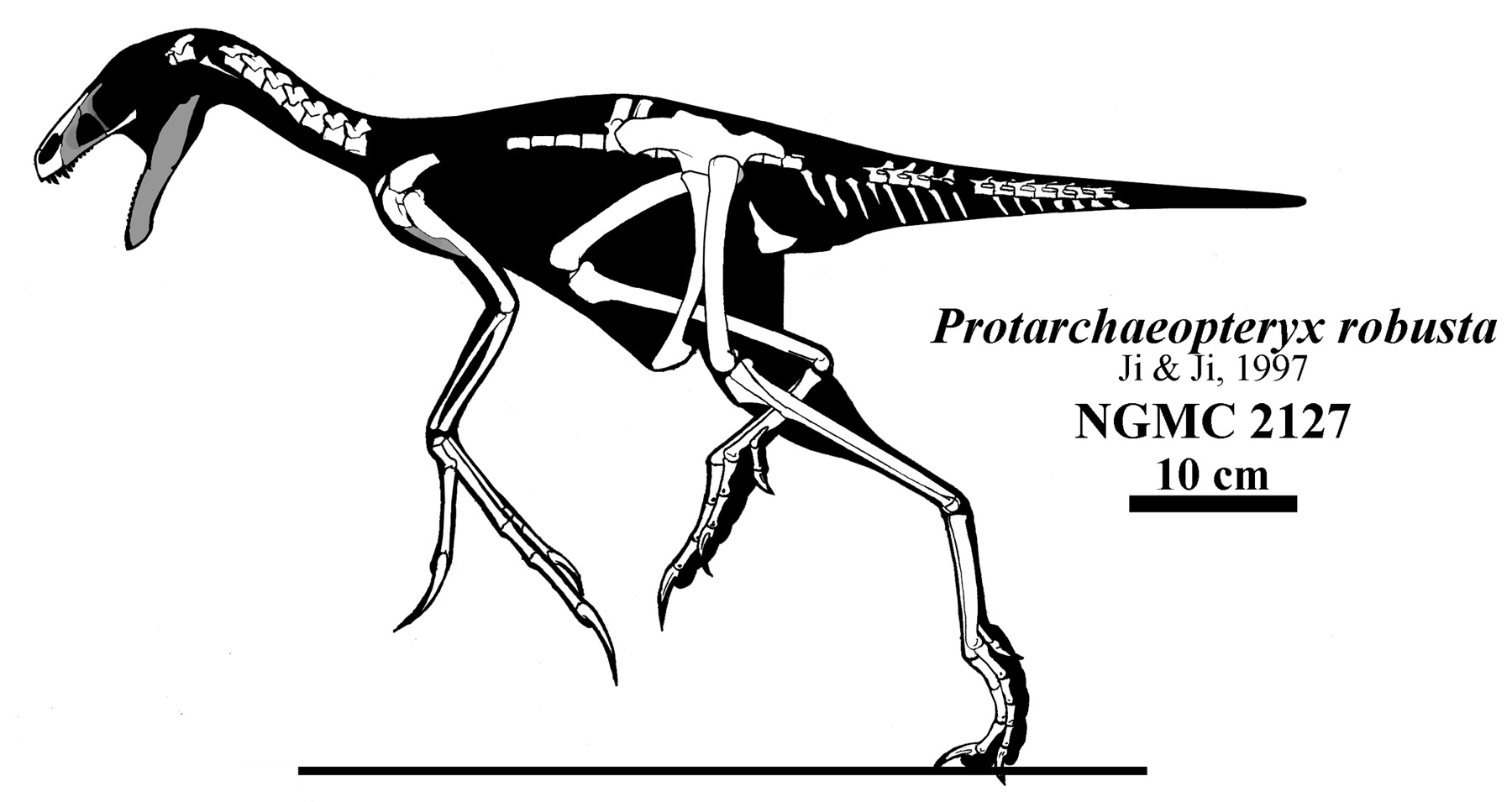
Skeletal reconstruction of known material

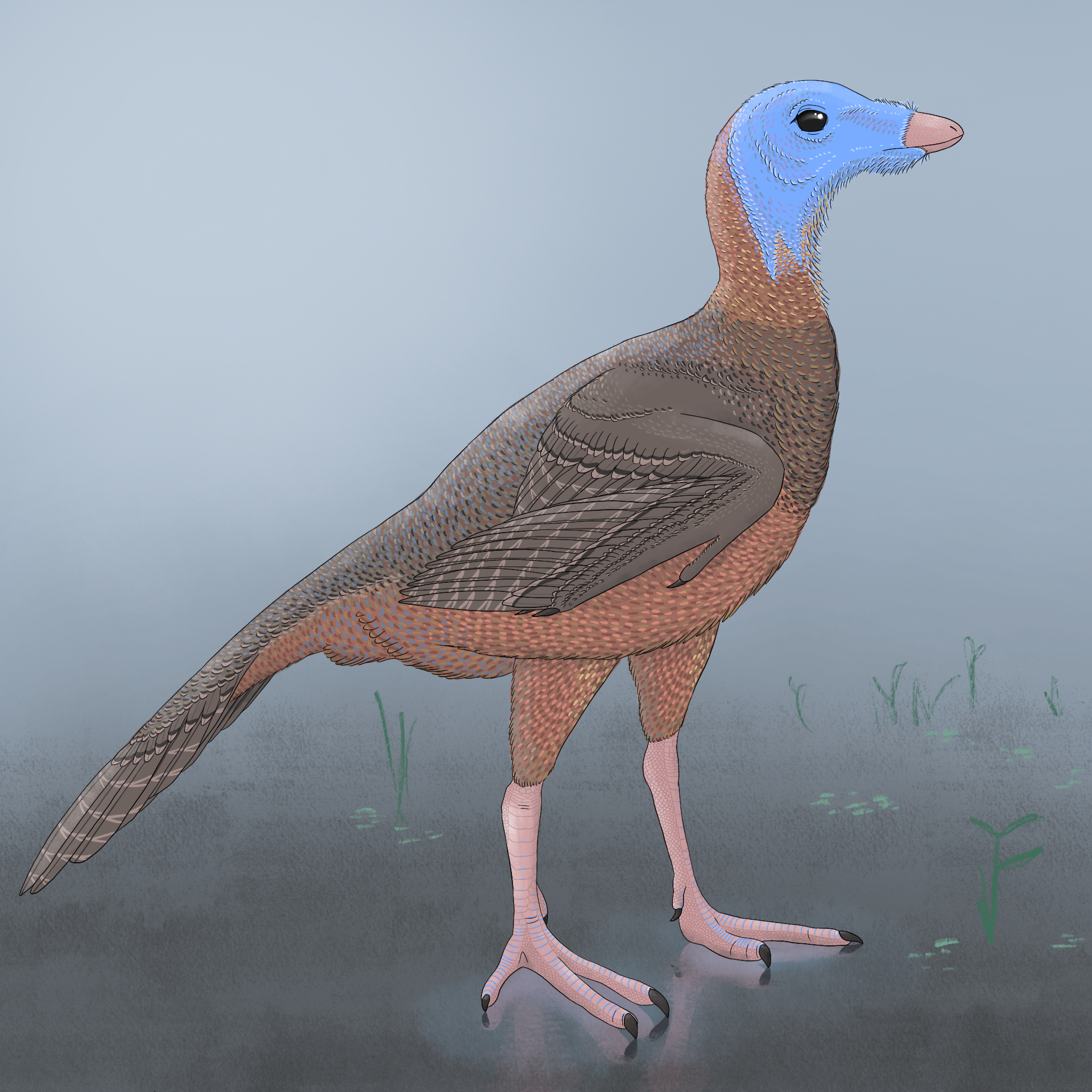
Speculative life restoration

The holotype and only known specimen of Protarchaeopteryx is NGMC 2125, a partial skeleton.

Protarchaeopteryx had long legs, and could have been a quick runner. It had well-developed, vaned feathers extended from a relatively short tail; the hands were long and slender, and had three fingers with sharp, curved claws. Its bones were hollow and bird-like, and it possessed a wishbone. At around 1 metre (3.3 ft) in length, it would have been larger than Archaeopteryx. In 2016, Gregory S. Paul gave a lower estimate of 0.7 metres (2.3 ft) in length and 1.6 kilograms (3.5 lb) in body mass. Protarchaeopteryx also had symmetrical feathers on its tail. Since modern birds that have symmetrical feathers are flightless, and the skeletal structure of Protarchaeopteryx would not support flapping flight, it is assumed that it was flightless as well. It has been suggested that it could have had an arboreal lifestyle, jumping from tree limbs and using its forelimbs for a form of parachuting.

== See also ==
- Timeline of oviraptorosaur research
