= Dashuigou Formation =

Geological formation in Inner Mongolia, China

- Stratigraphic range: Albian; ~110–100 Ma
- Type: Geological formation

Location
- Region: Inner Mongolia
- Country: China

The Dashuigou Formation (simplified Chinese: 大水沟组; traditional Chinese: 大水溝組; pinyin: Dàshuǐgōu Zǔ) is a geological formation in Inner Mongolia, north China, whose strata date back to the Early Cretaceous period.

The hadrosauroid Probactrosaurus has been reported from this formation, although it actually derives from the Miaogou Formation, which has outcrops nearby.

== See also ==
- List of dinosaur-bearing rock formations
