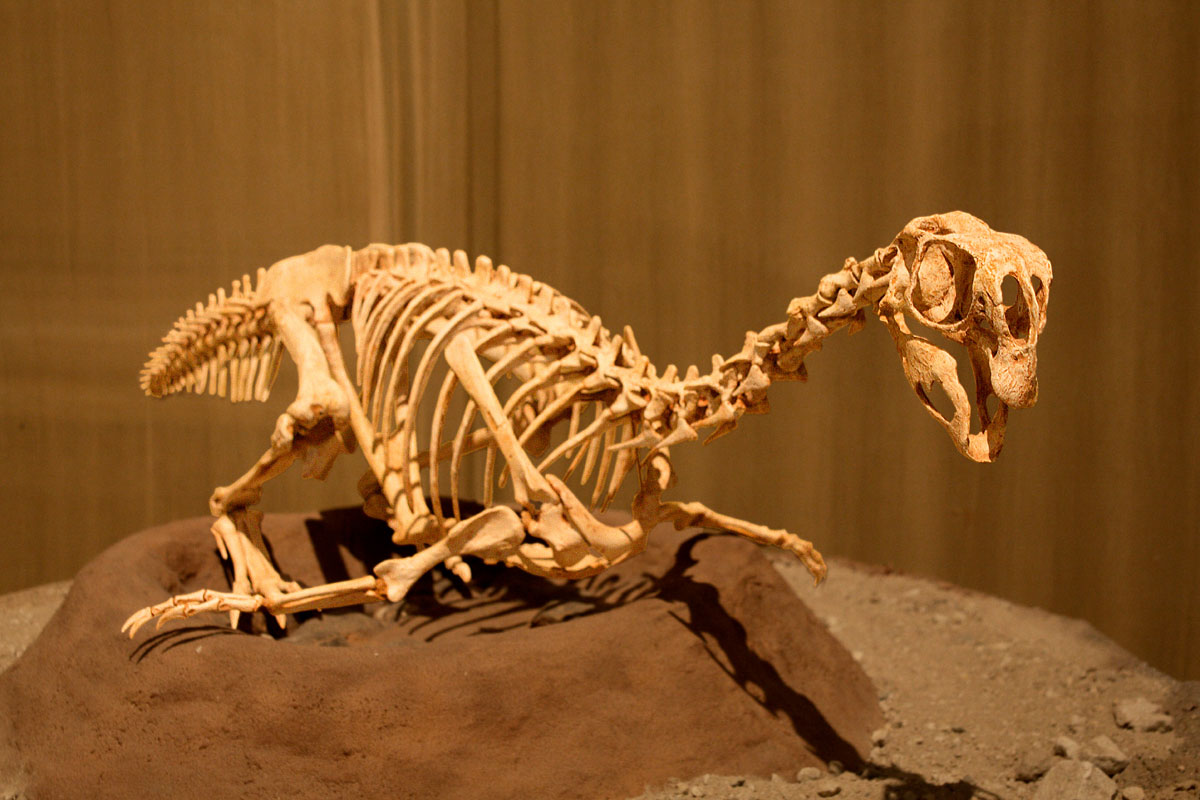
- Cast mounted in a nesting position

Scientific classification
- Kingdom: Animalia
- Phylum: Chordata
- Class: Reptilia
- Clade: Dinosauria
- Clade: Saurischia
- Clade: Theropoda
- Family: †Oviraptoridae
- Subfamily: †Heyuanninae
- Genus: †Conchoraptor; Barsbold, 1986
- Species: †C. gracilis

Binomial name
- †Conchoraptor gracilis Barsbold, 1986

= Conchoraptor =

Conchoraptor Temporal range: Late Cretaceous, Maastrichtian

Extinct genus of dinosaurs

Conchoraptor (meaning "conch plunderer") is a genus of oviraptorid dinosaurs that lived in Asia during the Late Cretaceous epoch, about 70 million years ago. It is known from the Barun Goyot and possibly the Nemegt formation of Mongolia.

== Discovery ==
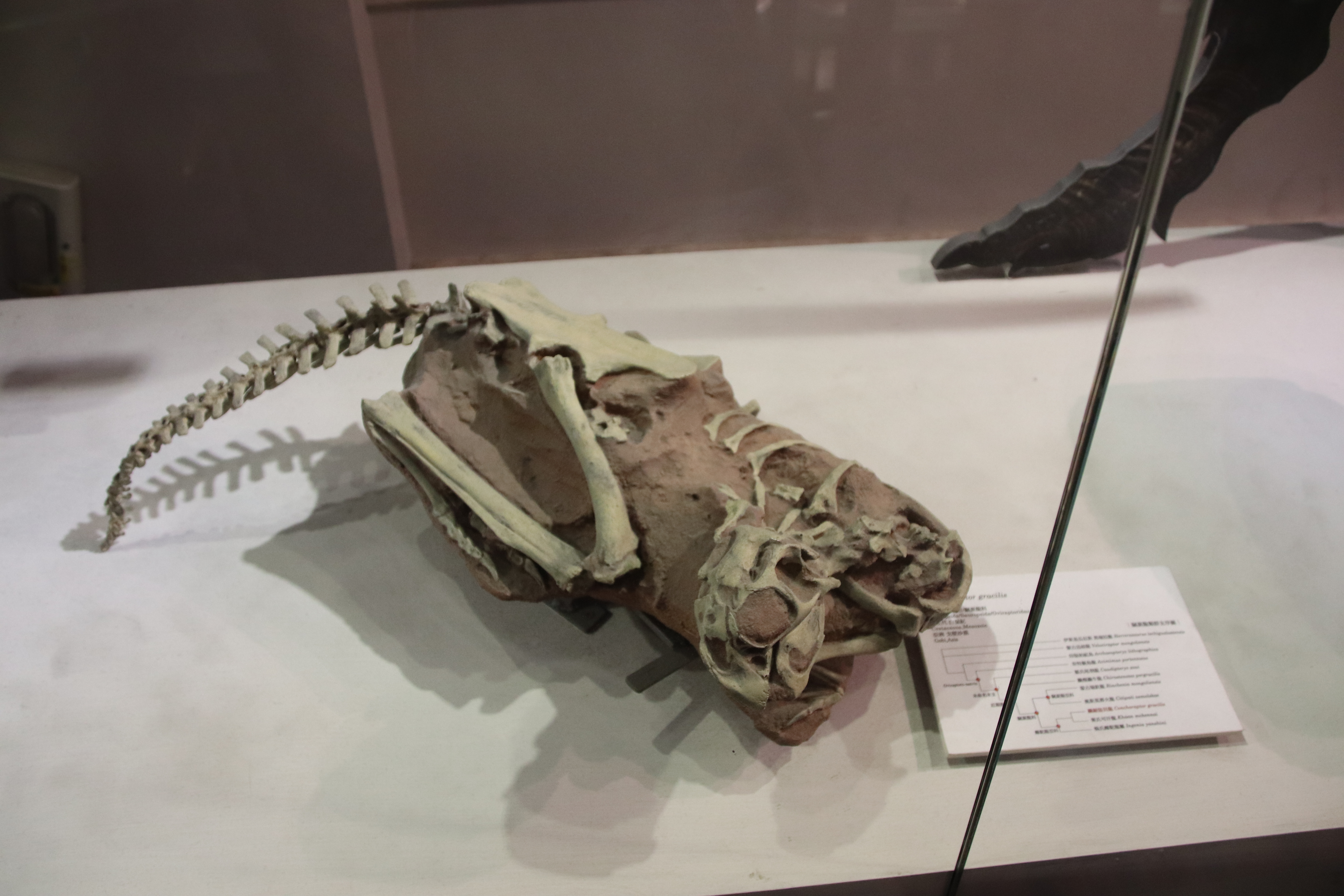
Subadult specimen

When first discovered in the Red Beds of Hermiin Tsav of the Maastrichtian Baruungoyot Formation by a Polish-Mongolian expedition in 1971, scientists believed that Conchoraptor was a juvenile Oviraptor and that the animal's missing crest would have begun to grow when the animal reached sexual maturity. Further study of multiple skeletons showed that Conchoraptor belonged to a new genus. The hands of Conchoraptor were a major reason scientists decided to split it off from Oviraptor. Anatomically the hands seemed to be an evolutionary intermediate between those of Ajancingenia and Oviraptor, making it obvious that this animal was not a member of a known species.

The type species of this new genus, Conchoraptor gracilis, was described and named by Barsbold, in 1986. The generic name is derived from Greek konkhè, "mussel", and Latin raptor, "plunderer". This name reflects Barsbold's hypothesis that oviraptorids, rather than preying primarily upon eggs as had been traditionally thought, may have been specialized to feed on mollusks. The specific name means "gracile" in Latin. The holotype is MPC-D 100/20, a partial skull. Numerous specimens were formally referred to the species later, including some recovered from the Barun Goyot Formation. Possible remains are known from the Nemegt Formation.

== Description ==
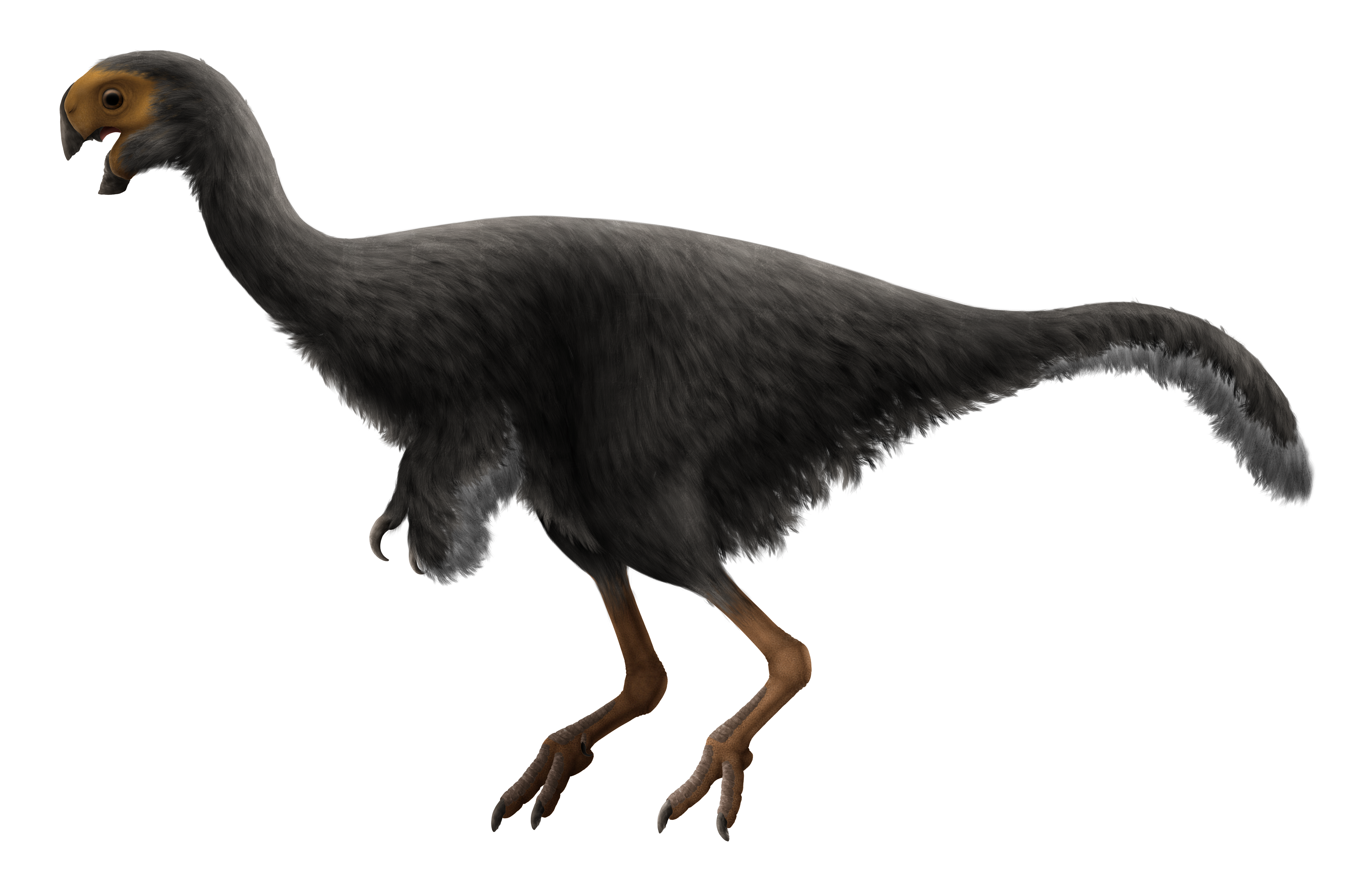
Life restoration

Conchoraptor was a small dinosaur, only 1–2 meters (3.3–6.6 ft) in length. Unlike many other oviraptorids, Conchoraptor lacked a head crest. Like its relatives, it lacked teeth. Instead of teeth, oviraptorids had powerful beaks, possibly adapted to crushing mollusk shells. The skull of Conchoraptor was heavily pneumatised, with most of the bones hollow.

== Classification ==
Conchoraptor was by Barsbold assigned to the Oviraptoridae in 1986. Recent analyses show it was a member of the oviraptorid subfamily Ingeniinae (now Heyuanninae). The cladogram below follows an analysis by Fanti et al., 2012.

- Oviraptoridae
  - Oviraptor
  - unnamed
    - Rinchenia
    - Citipati
  - unnamed
    - Khaan
    - unnamed
      - Conchoraptor
      - unnamed
        - Machairasaurus
        - unnamed
          - "Ingenia" (=Ajancingenia)
          - unnamed
            - Nemegtomaia
            - Heyuannia

== Paleobiology ==
=== Senses ===
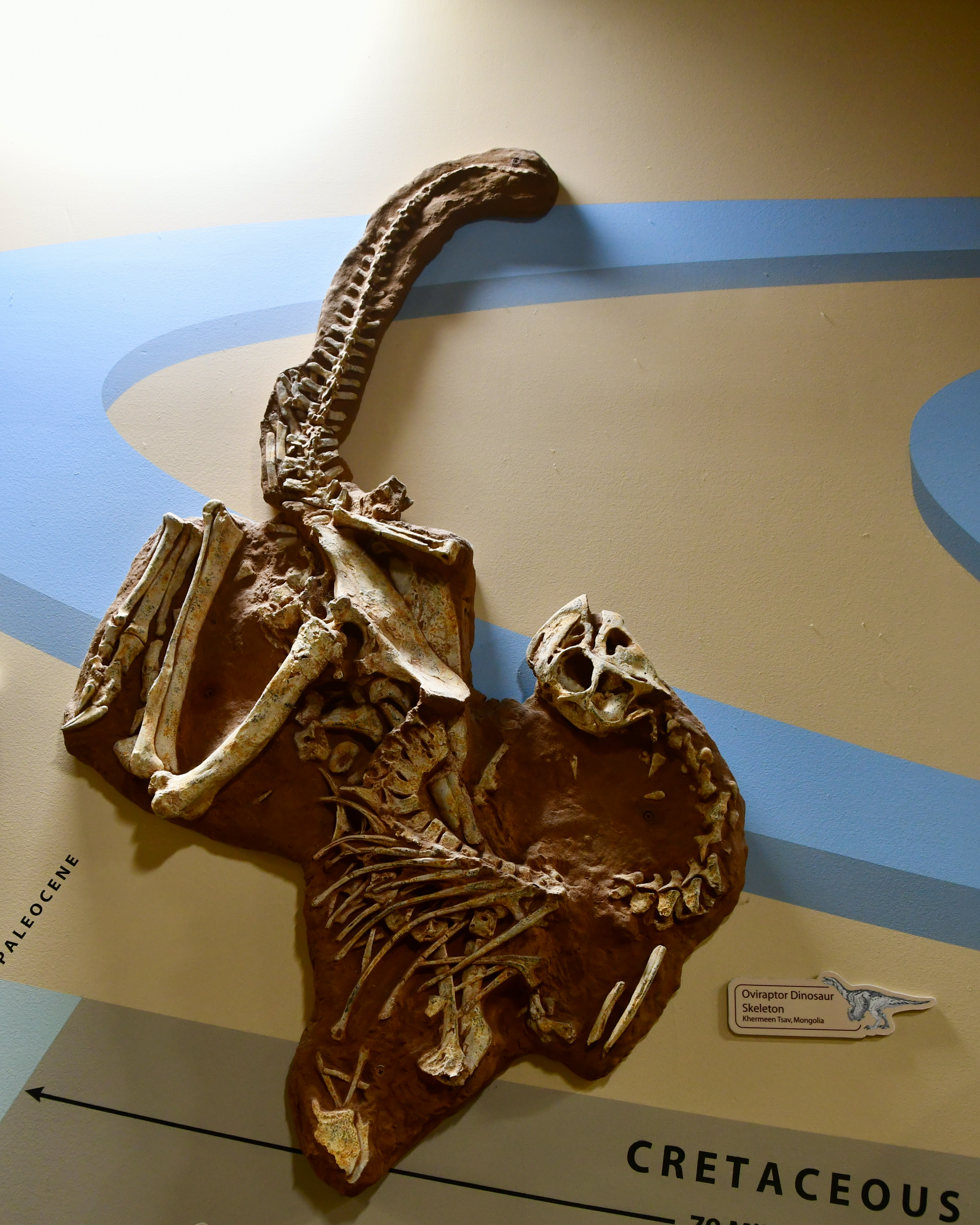
Specimen from Khermeen Tsav

Internal connections between both ears functioned as resonance chambers and improved hearing.

=== Feeding ===
Originally it was suggested that Conchoraptor had a diet that primarily consisted of mollusks. A 2022 study of the bite force of Conchoraptor and comparisons with other oviraptorosaurs such as Incisivosaurus, Citipati, and Khaan instead suggests that Conchoraptor had a very strong bite force. The moderate jaw gape seen in oviraptorosaurs is indicative of herbivory in the majority of the group, but it is clear they were likely feeding on much tougher or more various types of vegetation than other herbivorous theropods in their environment, such as ornithomimosaurs and therizinosaurs were able to. The examinations suggest oviraptorosaurs may have been powerful-biting generalists or specialists that partook of niche partitioning both in body size and cranial function.

== Paleoenvironment ==
The Baruungoyot Formation of Mongolia, is estimated to date back to the Maastrichtian stage. During the Late Cretaceous period, the land that is now the Baruun Goyot Formation had an arid environment with fields of sand dunes and only intermittent streams.

If the remains from the Nemegt Formation belong to Conchoraptor, then it would have shared its habitat with other oviraptorosaurs including Avimimus and Nomingia, other theropods include troodontids such as Tochisaurus and Zanabazar, the tyrannosaurids Alioramus and Tarbosaurus. Ornithischians include the pachycephalosaurs Homalocephale and Prenocephale, the hadrosaurid Saurolophus, the ankylosaurs Saichania and Tarchia.

== See also ==
- Timeline of oviraptorosaur research
