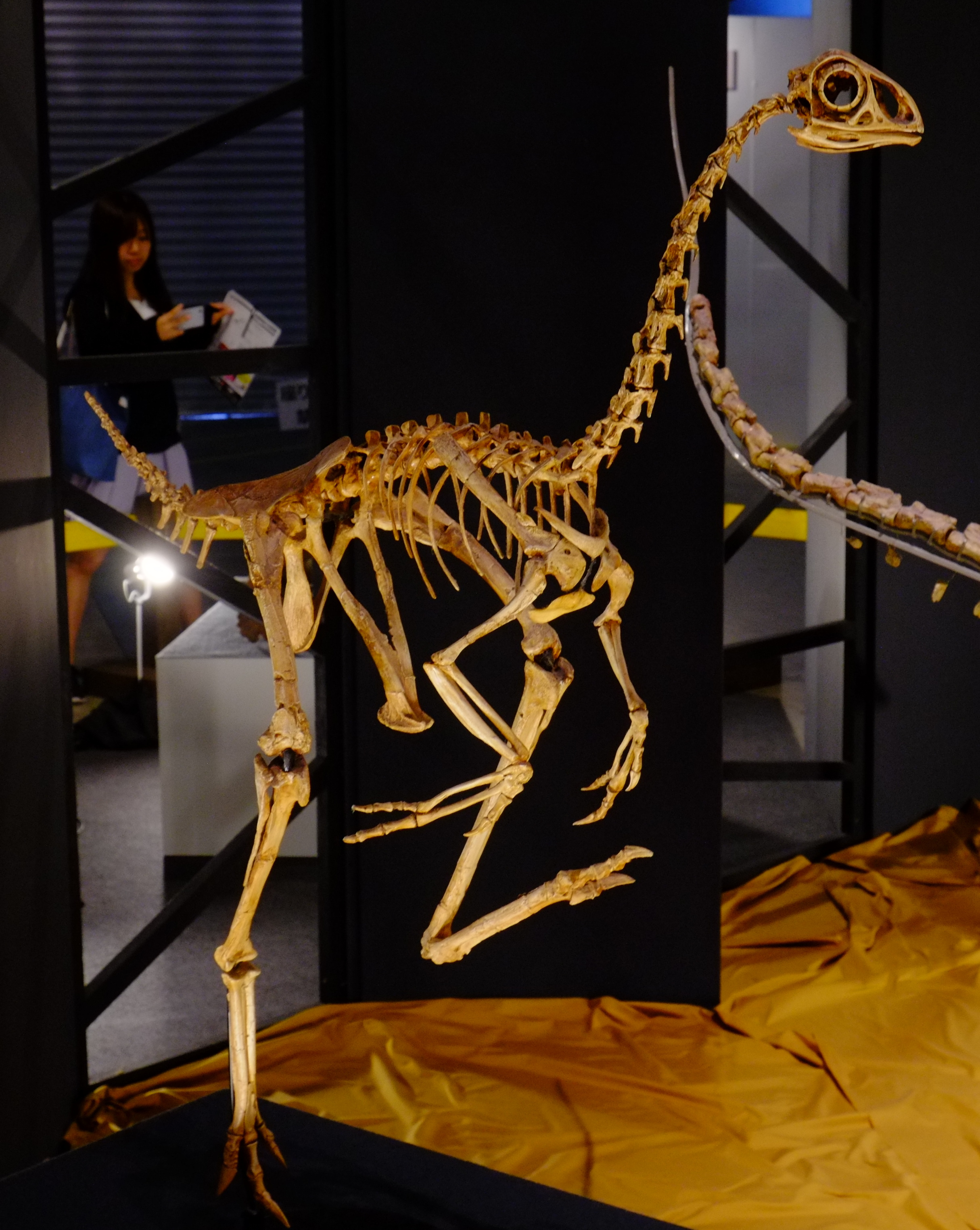
- Reconstructed skeleton cast

Scientific classification
- Kingdom: Animalia
- Phylum: Chordata
- Class: Reptilia
- Clade: Dinosauria
- Clade: Saurischia
- Clade: Theropoda
- Clade: Pennaraptora
- Clade: †Oviraptorosauria
- Family: †Avimimidae; Kurzanov, 1981
- Genus: †Avimimus; Kurzanov, 1981

Type species
- †Avimimus portentosus Kurzanov, 1981

Other species
- †A. nemegtensis Funston et al., 2018

= Avimimus =

Avimimus Temporal range: Late Cretaceous, Maastrichtian

Extinct genus of reptiles

Avimimus (/ˌeɪvɪˈmaɪməs/ AY-vim-EYE-məs), meaning "bird mimic" (Latin avis = bird + mimus = mimic), is a genus of oviraptorosaurian theropod dinosaur, named for its bird-like characteristics, that lived in the late Cretaceous in what is now Mongolia, during the Maastrichtian.

== Discovery and species ==
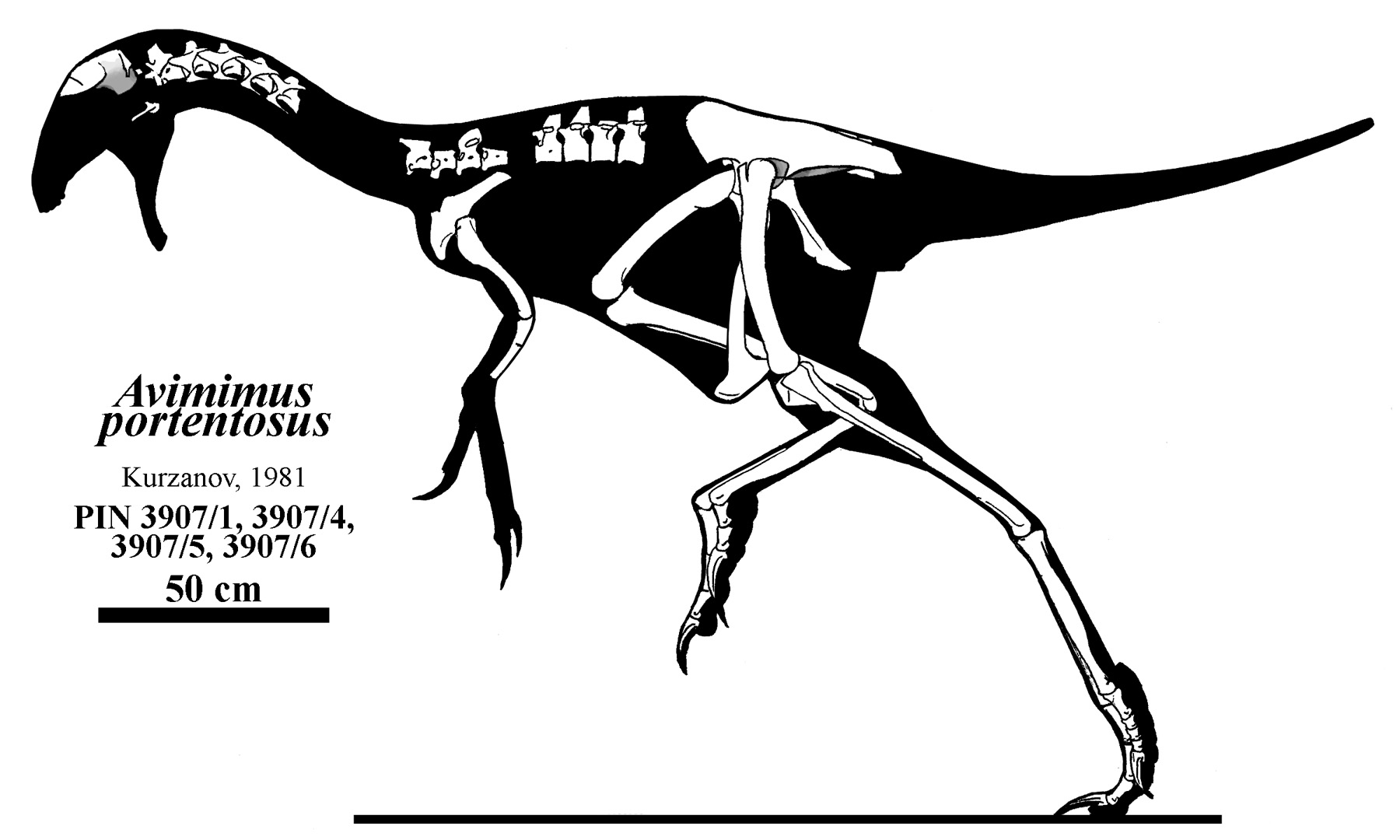
Skeletal diagram showing some known elements of A. portentosus

The remains of Avimimus were recovered by Russian paleontologists and officially described by Dr. Sergei Kurzanov in 1981. The Avimimus fossils were initially described as having come from the Djadokta Formation by Kurzanov; however, in a 2006 description of a new specimen, Watabe and colleagues noted that Kurzanov was probably mistaken about the provenance, and it is more likely that Avimimus hailed from the more recent Nemegt Formation. The type species is A. portentosus. Because no tail was found with the original find, Kurzanov mistakenly concluded that Avimimus lacked a tail in life. However, subsequent Avimimus finds containing caudal vertebrae have confirmed the presence of a tail. A second nearly complete specimen of Avimimus was discovered in 1996 and described in 2000 by Watabe and colleagues. Additionally, these authors identified a number of small theropod footprints in the same area as belonging to Avimimus.

A variety of isolated bones that have been attributed to Avimimus were considered to be distinct from A. portentosus, and were initially referred to as Avimimus sp. In 2008, a team of Canadian, American, and Mongolian paleontologists headed by Phil Currie reported in 2006 an extensive bonebed of Avimimus sp. fossils. The bonebed is in the Nemegt Formation, 10.5 meters above the Barun Goyot Formation, in the Gobi Desert. The team reported finding abundant bones of at least ten individuals of Avimimus, but the deposit may hold more. All individuals were either adult or subadult, and the adults showed little variation in size, suggesting determinate growth. The team also suggests that the individuals were found together because they were gregarious in life, providing possible indications that Avimimus formed age-segregated groups for either lekking or flocking purposes. The adults showed a greater degree of skeletal fusion in the tarsometatarsus and tibiotarsus, and also more prominent muscle scars. The preservation of the bonebeds suggest that they were buried rapidly, uncovered by rapid flow of water, and then buried again a short distance away. In 2018, Avimimus sp. was formally described as a new species, A. nemegtensis.

== Description ==
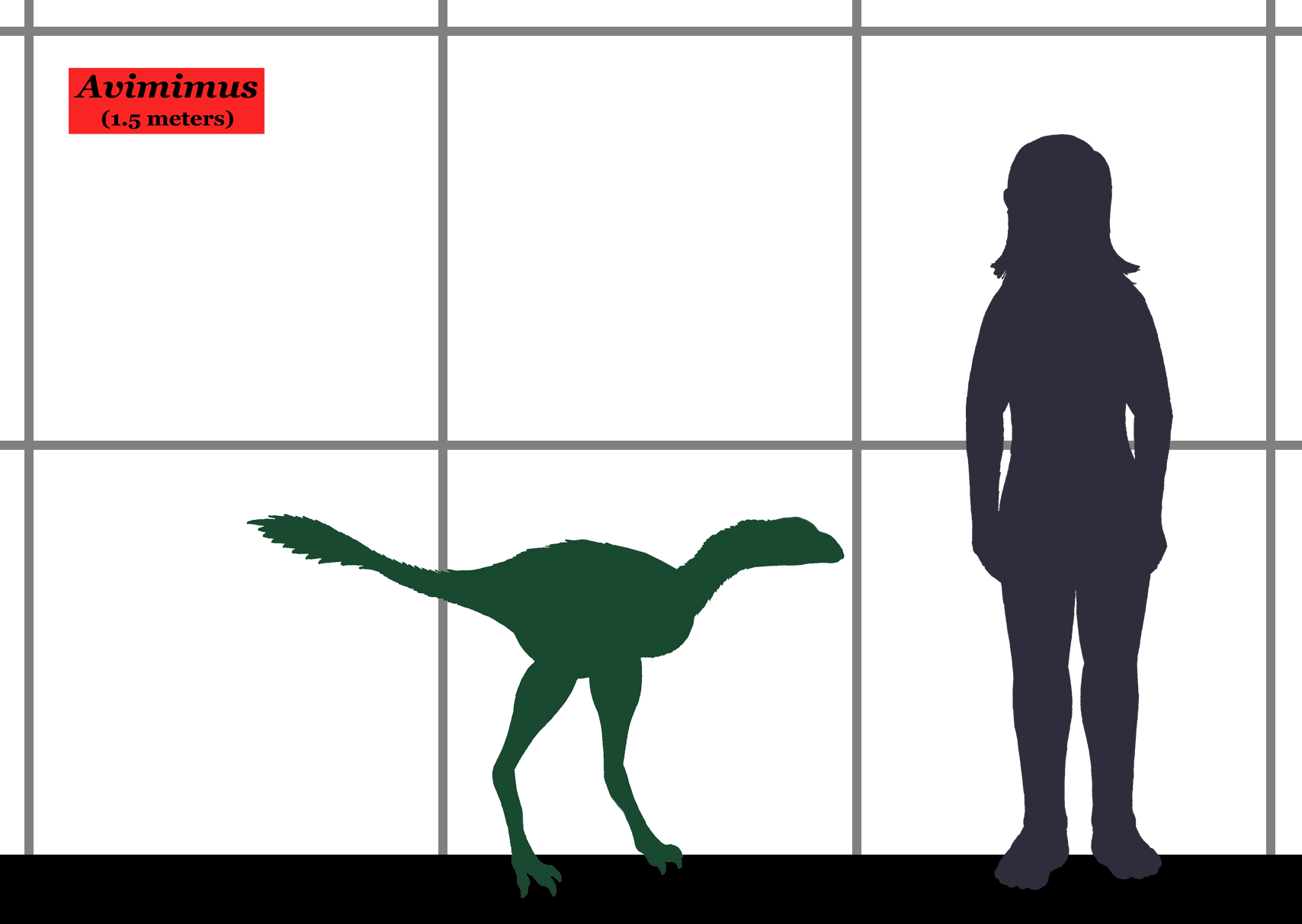
Size of A. portentosus compared to a human

Avimimus was a small, bird-like dinosaur with a length of 1.5 m (5 ft). The skull was small compared to the body, though the brain and eyes were large. The size of the bones which surrounded the brain and were dedicated to protecting it are large. This is also consistent with the hypothesis that Avimimus had a proportionally large brain.

The jaws of Avimimus were thought to form a parrot-like beak lacking teeth, and a thorough review of the holotype specimen's anatomy confirmed that no teeth were preserved, although a series of tooth-like projections along the tip of the premaxilla were. However, subsequently discovered specimens have been reported to preserve small premaxillary teeth. The small teeth or possible lack thereof in Avimimus suggests that it may have been an herbivore or omnivore. Kurzanov himself, however, believed that Avimimus was an insectivore.

The foramen magnum, the hole allowing the spinal cord to connect with the brain, was proportionally large in Avimimus. The occipital condyle, however, was small, further suggestive of the skull's relative lightness. The neck itself was long and slender, and is composed of vertebrae that are much more elongate than in other oviraptorosaurs. Unlike oviraptorids and caenagnathids, the back vertebrae lack openings for air sacs, suggesting that Avimimus is more primitive than these animals.

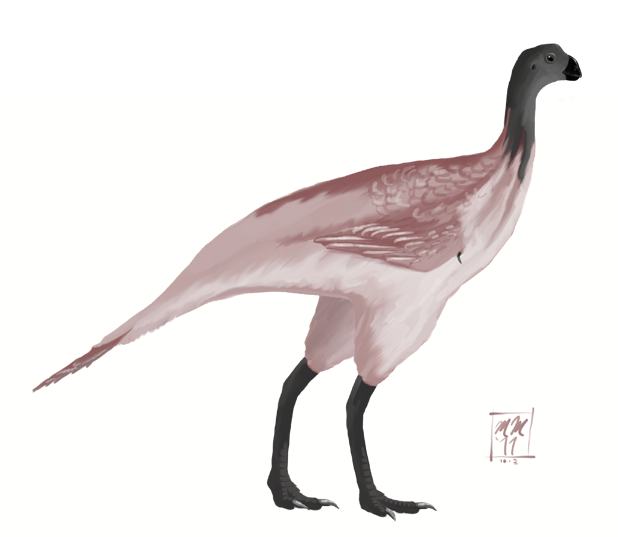
Restoration of A. portentosus

The forelimbs were relatively short. The bones of the hand were fused together, as in modern birds, and a ridge on the ulna (lower arm bone) was interpreted as an attachment point for feathers by Kurzanov. Kurzanov, in 1987, also reported the presence of quill knobs, and while Chiappe confirmed the presence of bumps on the ulna, their function remained unclear. Kurzanov was so convinced they were attachment points for feathers that he concluded that Avimimus may have been capable of weak flight. The presence of feathers is now widely accepted, but most paleontologists do not believe Avimimus could fly.

The ilium was almost horizontally oriented, resulting in exceptionally broad hips. Little is known of the tail but the hip suggests that the tail was long. The legs were extremely long and slender, suggesting that Avimimus was a highly specialized runner. The proportions of the leg bones add further weight to the idea of Avimimus was quick on its feet. The animal's shins were long in comparison with its thighs, a trait common among cursorial animals. It also had three-toed feet with narrow pointed claws.

== Classification ==
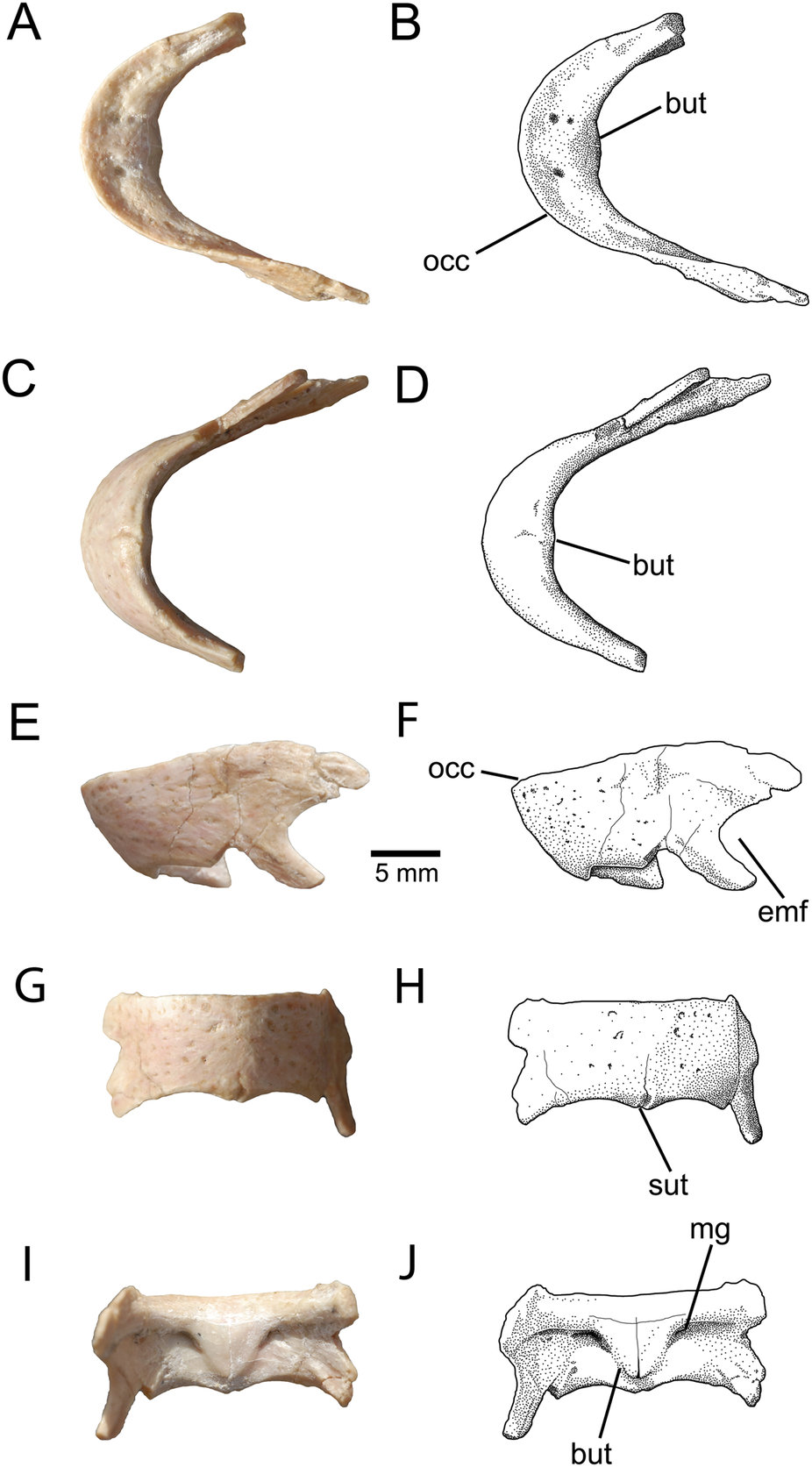
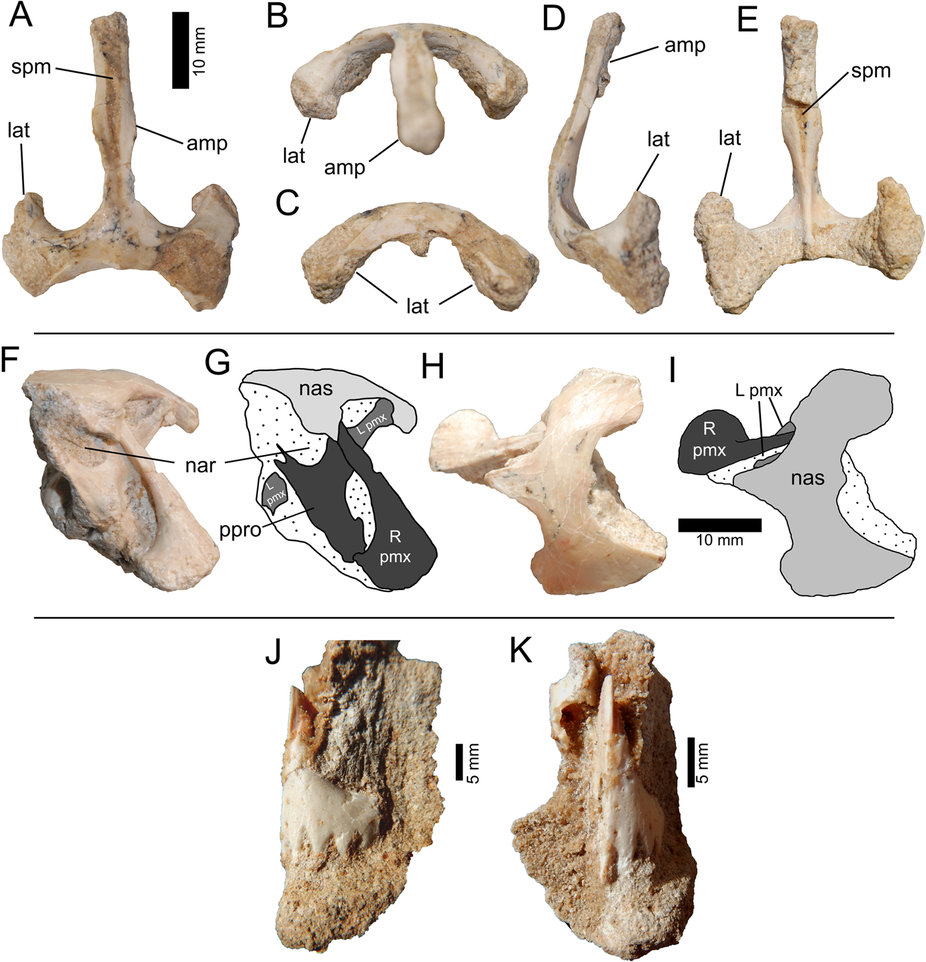
Partial dentary and nasal bones of A. nemegtensis

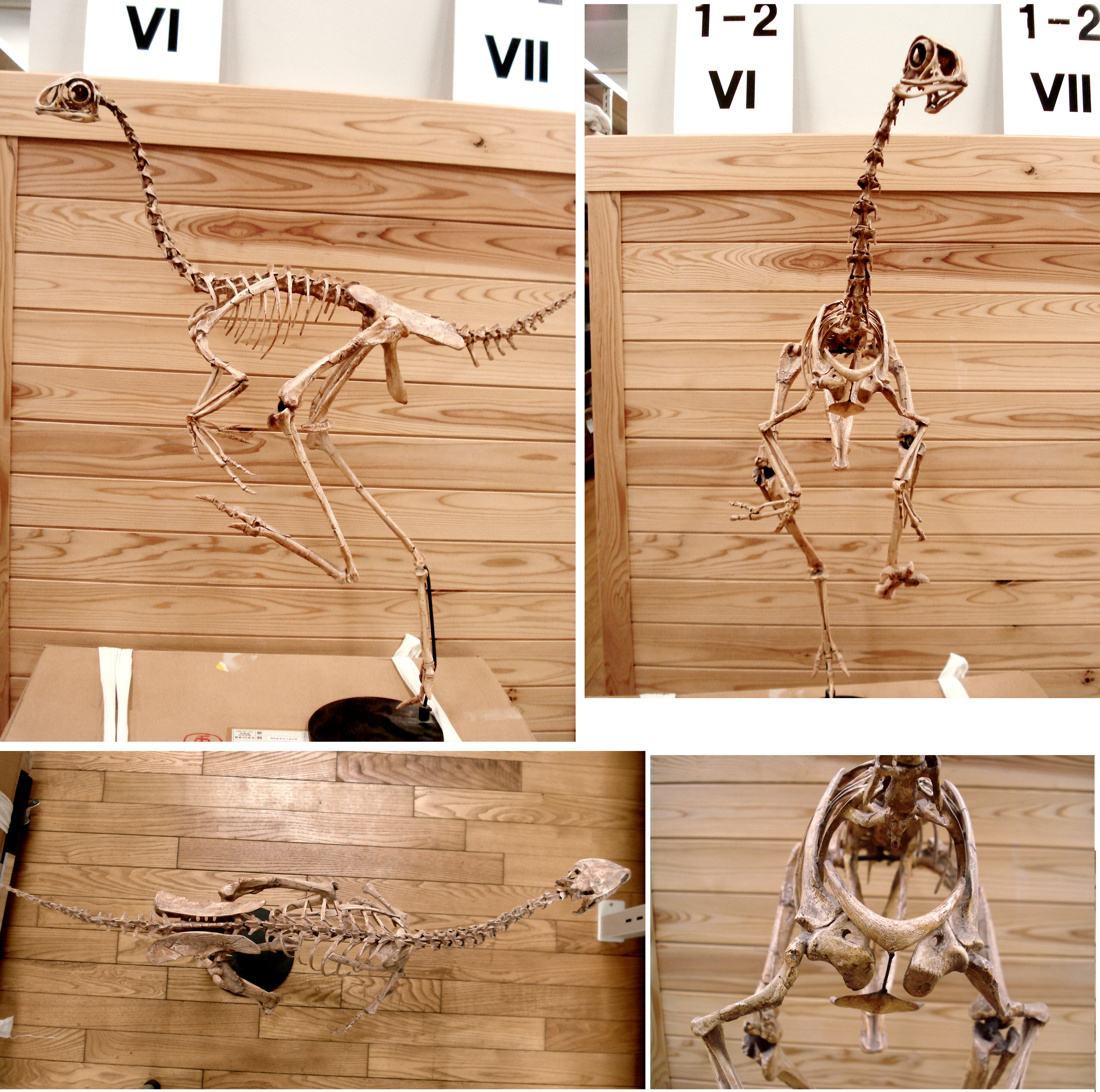
Avimimus in left side, front, and top views. Close-up of chest.

Avimimus was originally suggested to be a very close relative of birds, given its unique suite of bird-like features not known in other dinosaurs at the time. In fact, Kurzanov argued that Avimimus, rather than the famous early bird Archaeopteryx, was close to the direct ancestor of modern birds, and that Archaeopteryx was not as closely related to birds as had previously been suggested. However, this view has not been supported by later phylogenetic analyses of dinosaur and bird relationships. Most modern scientists find that Avimimus in fact belongs to a diverse group of bird-like dinosaurs more primitive than Archaeopteryx, the oviraptorosaurs.

Kurzanov placed Avimimus in its own family, Avimimidae, in 1981. In 1991, Sankar Chatterjee erected the Order Avimimiformes to include Avimimus. Neither of these group names is used frequently by paleontologists as they include only a single species. More recent studies have shown that Avimimus is best grouped within the Oviraptoridae, within the subgroup Elmisaurinae.

The following cladogram follows an analysis by Phil Senter, 2007.

- Caenagnathoidea
  - Avimimus
  - Caenagnathus
  - unnamed
    - Caudipteryx
    - Microvenator
    - Oviraptoridae
      - Oviraptor
      - unnamed
        - IGM 100/42
        - Rinchenia
        - unnamed
          - Citipati
          - unnamed
            - Chirostenotes
            - Elmisaurus
            - Hagryphus
      - Ingeniinae
        - unnamed
          - Heyuannia
        - unnamed
          - Conchoraptor
          - Khaan

== Paleoecology ==
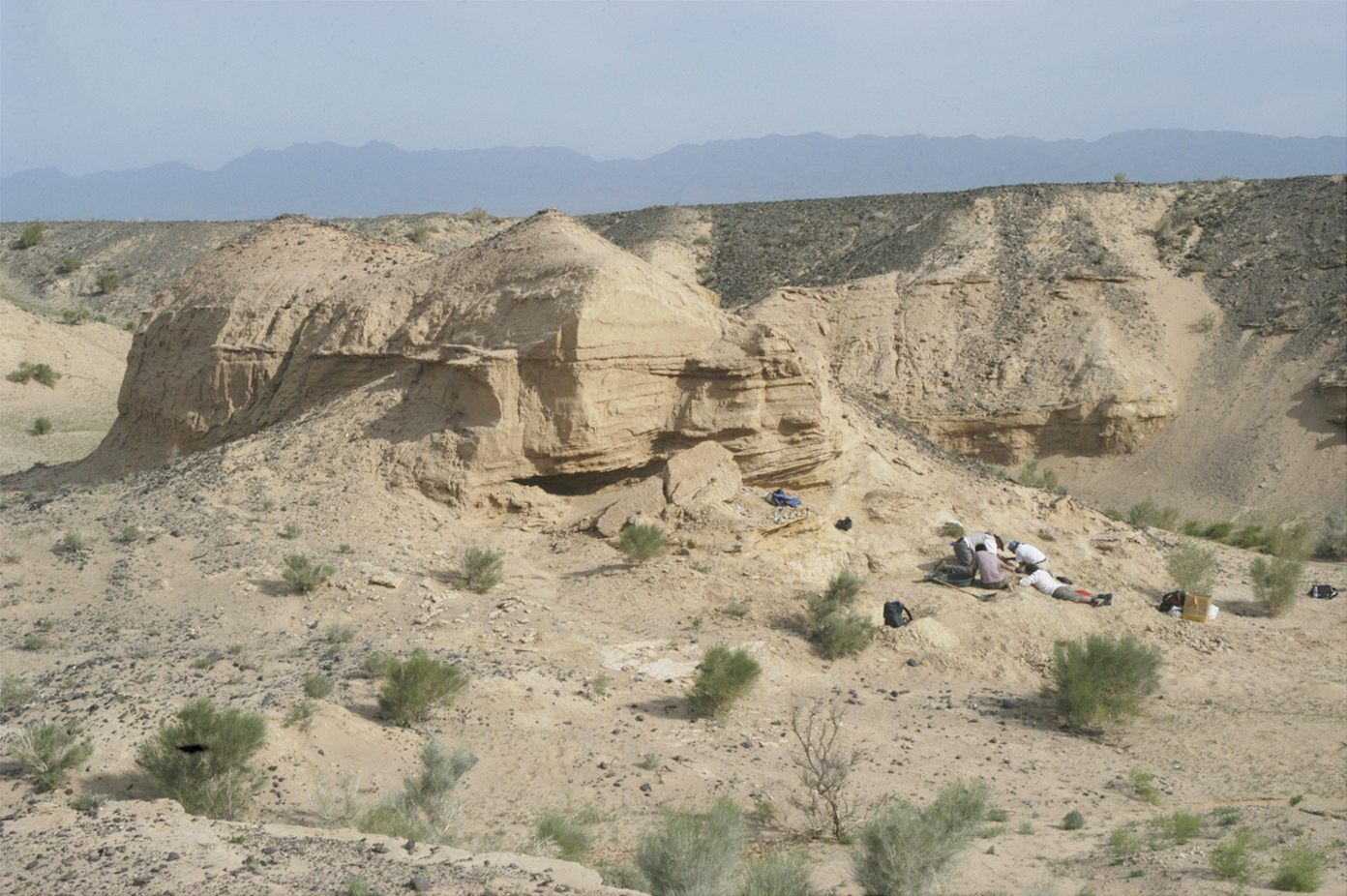
Excavation at a bonebed of A. nemegtensis reported in 2006

The Nemegt Formation of Mongolia, is estimated to date back to the Maastrichtian. During the Late Cretaceous period, the land that is now the Nemegt Formation had a continental semi-arid climate, with average annual temperatures estimated at 7-8 Degrees C annually. It is interpreted as having wet summers and dry winters, with summer rainfall sourced from the East Asian monsoon.

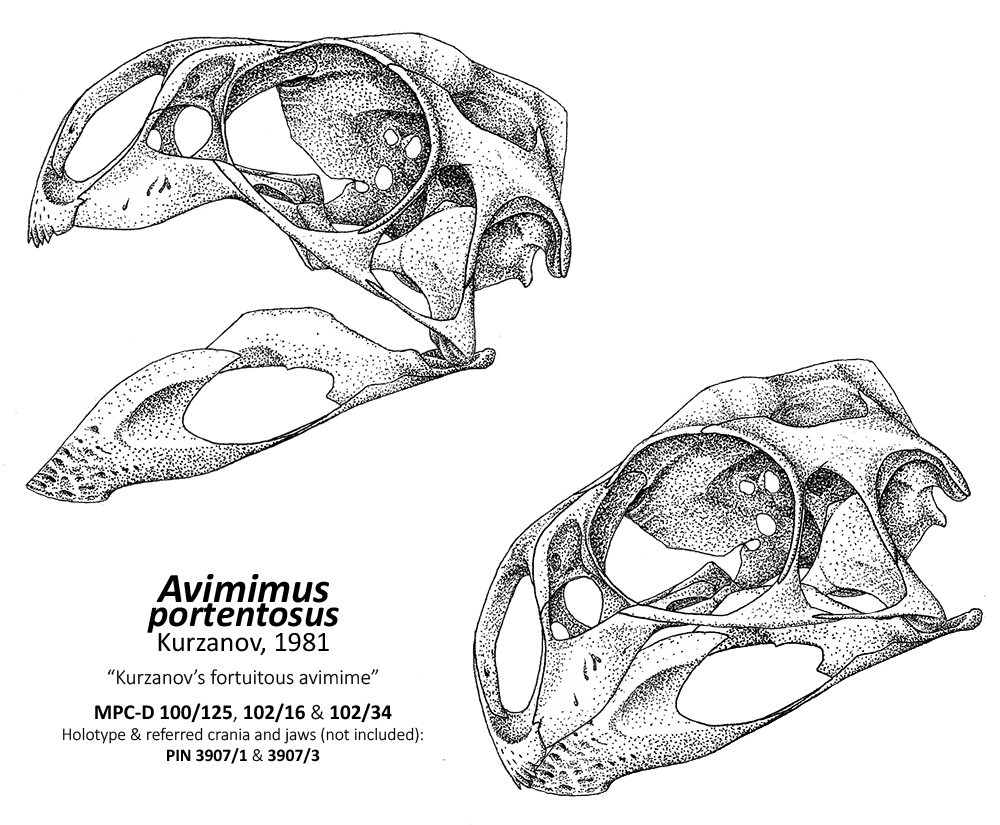
Skull diagram of A. nemegtensis

The Nemegt formation is characterized by a floodplain ecosystem, considered similar to the Okavango Delta today. In the Nemegt it coexisted with other dinosaurs like, the tyrannosaurid Tarbosaurus, hadrosaurid Saurolophus, and a variety of other dinosaurs.

Both species of Avimimus come from different layers in the Nemegt formation. A. portentosus is known from the Bugiin Tsav and Shar Tsav localities, correlated to the Middle & Upper Nemegt formation. A. nemegtensis comes from the Nemegt locality, correlated with the Lower Nemegt formation.

== See also ==
- Timeline of oviraptorosaur research
