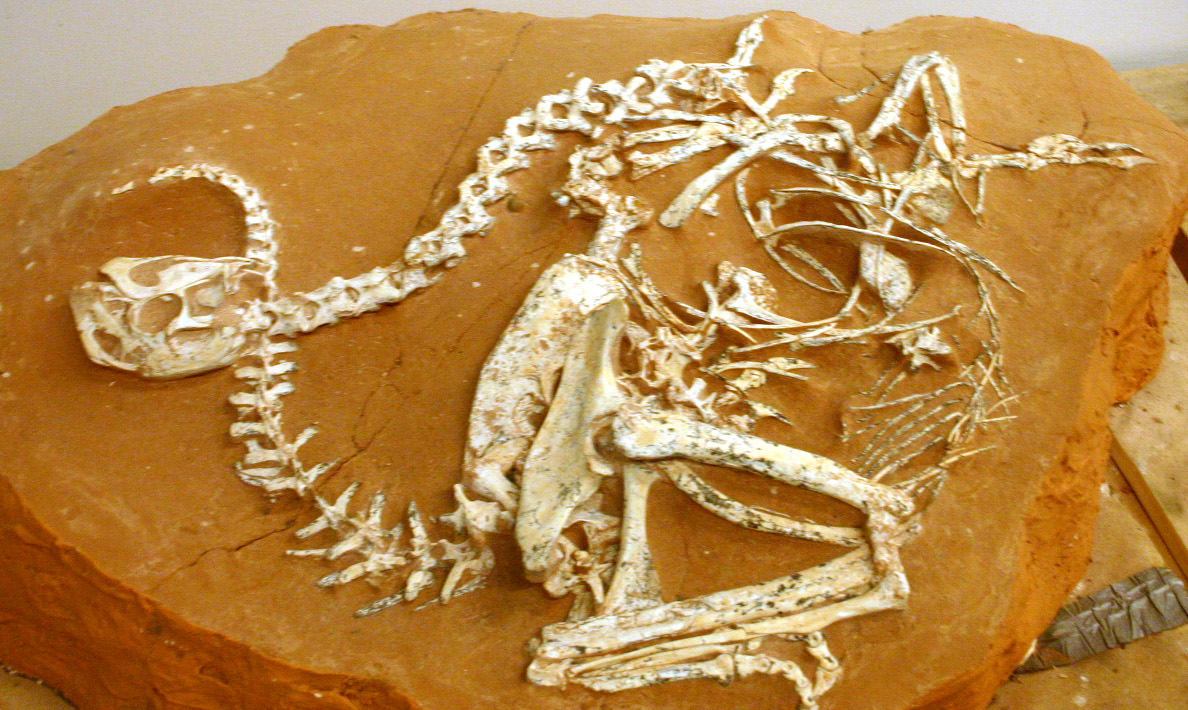
- Holotype IGM 100/1127

Scientific classification
- Kingdom: Animalia
- Phylum: Chordata
- Class: Reptilia
- Clade: Dinosauria
- Clade: Saurischia
- Clade: Theropoda
- Family: †Oviraptoridae
- Subfamily: †Heyuanninae
- Genus: †Khaan; Clark, Norell & Barsbold, 2001
- Species: †K. mckennai

Binomial name
- †Khaan mckennai Clark, Norell, & Barsbold, 2001

= Khaan =

Khaan Temporal range: Late Cretaceous, 75–71 Ma

Extinct genus of dinosaurs

Khaan (/ˈkɑːn/; from Mongol [χaːŋ] 'lord') is an extinct genus of oviraptorid dinosaur known from remains found in the Djadochta Formation of Mongolia, dating to the Late Cretaceous (Campanian, 75-71 million years ago). Together they were informally referred to as "Romeo and Juliet".

== Description ==
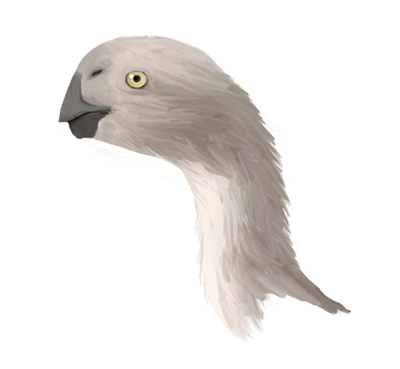
Artist's impression

Khaan did not differ much from other oviraptorids. At first, its remains were assigned to "Ingenia", but the Khaan manual structure, lacking the expansion of the upper third metacarpal, was considered to differ sufficiently from that of "Ingenia" for it to be assigned to its own genus.

The oviraptorid diet is disputed, with plants and molluscs having been suggested. Like other oviraptorids, Khaan was probably at least partially a meat eater, feeding on small vertebrates like mammals, lizards and possibly other small dinosaurs. It was also probably feathered.

== Discovery ==
The type species Khaan mckennai was named by James M. Clark et al. in 2001. The genus name is derived from Mongol khaan, "lord" or "ruler". The specific name honours the paleontologist Malcolm Carnegie McKenna.

The holotype IGM 100/1127 consists of an almost complete skeleton found together with another specimen, IGM 100/1002. Together they were informally referred to as "Romeo and Juliet". These individuals are about four feet long. A third, considerably larger, specimen, IGM 100/973, was referred to the species.

== Classification ==
Size comparison with a human

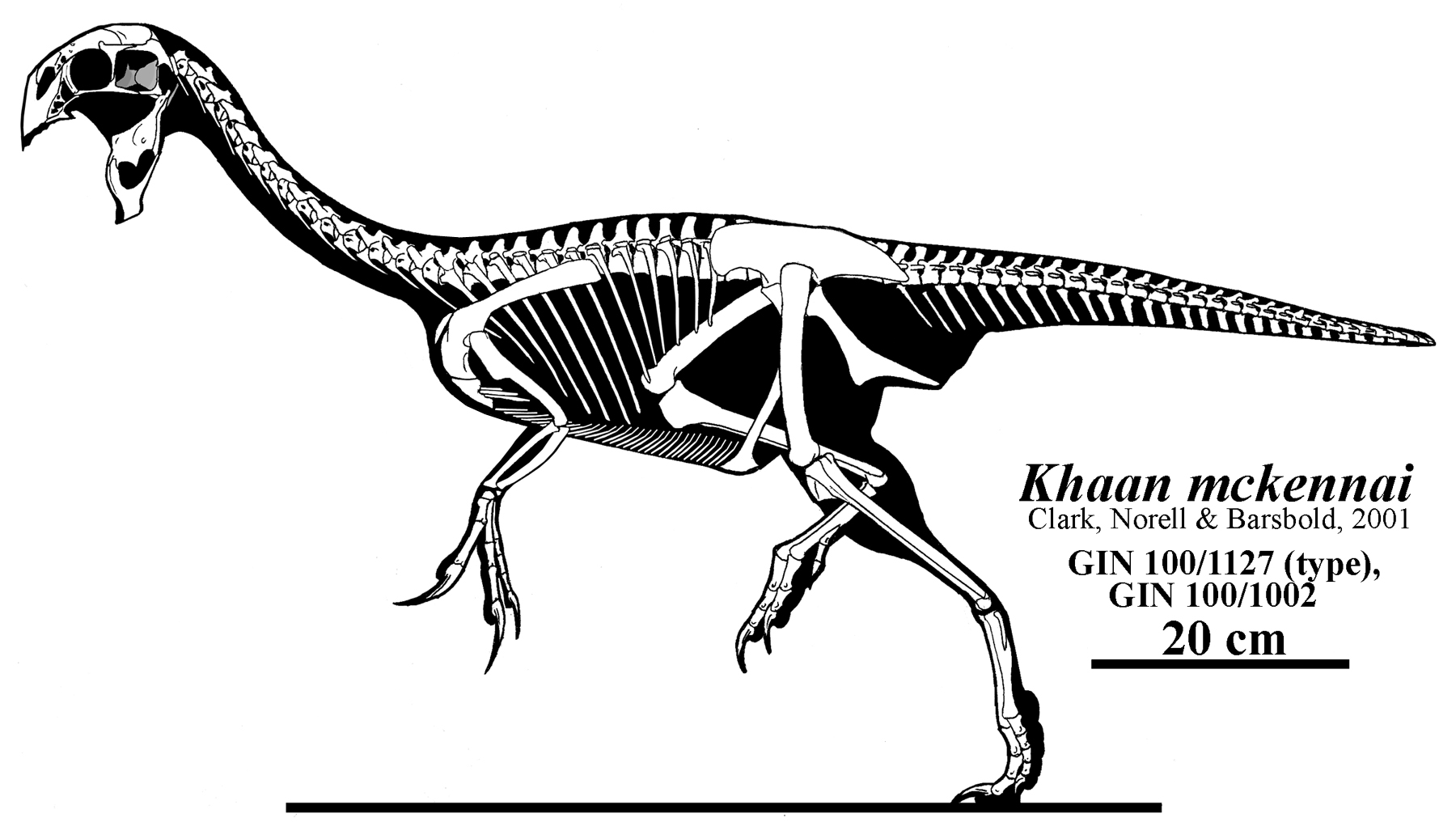
Skeletal restoration

Khaan was by Clark assigned to the Oviraptoridae. Among oviraptorids, it was probably more closely related to Conchoraptor.

The cladogram below follows an analysis by Fanti et al., 2012.

- Oviraptoridae
  - Oviraptor
  - unnamed
    - Rinchenia
    - Citipati
  - unnamed
    - Khaan
    - unnamed
      - Conchoraptor
      - unnamed
        - Machairasaurus
        - unnamed
          - "Ingenia" (=Ajancingenia)
          - unnamed
            - Nemegtomaia
            - Heyuannia

== Paleobiology ==
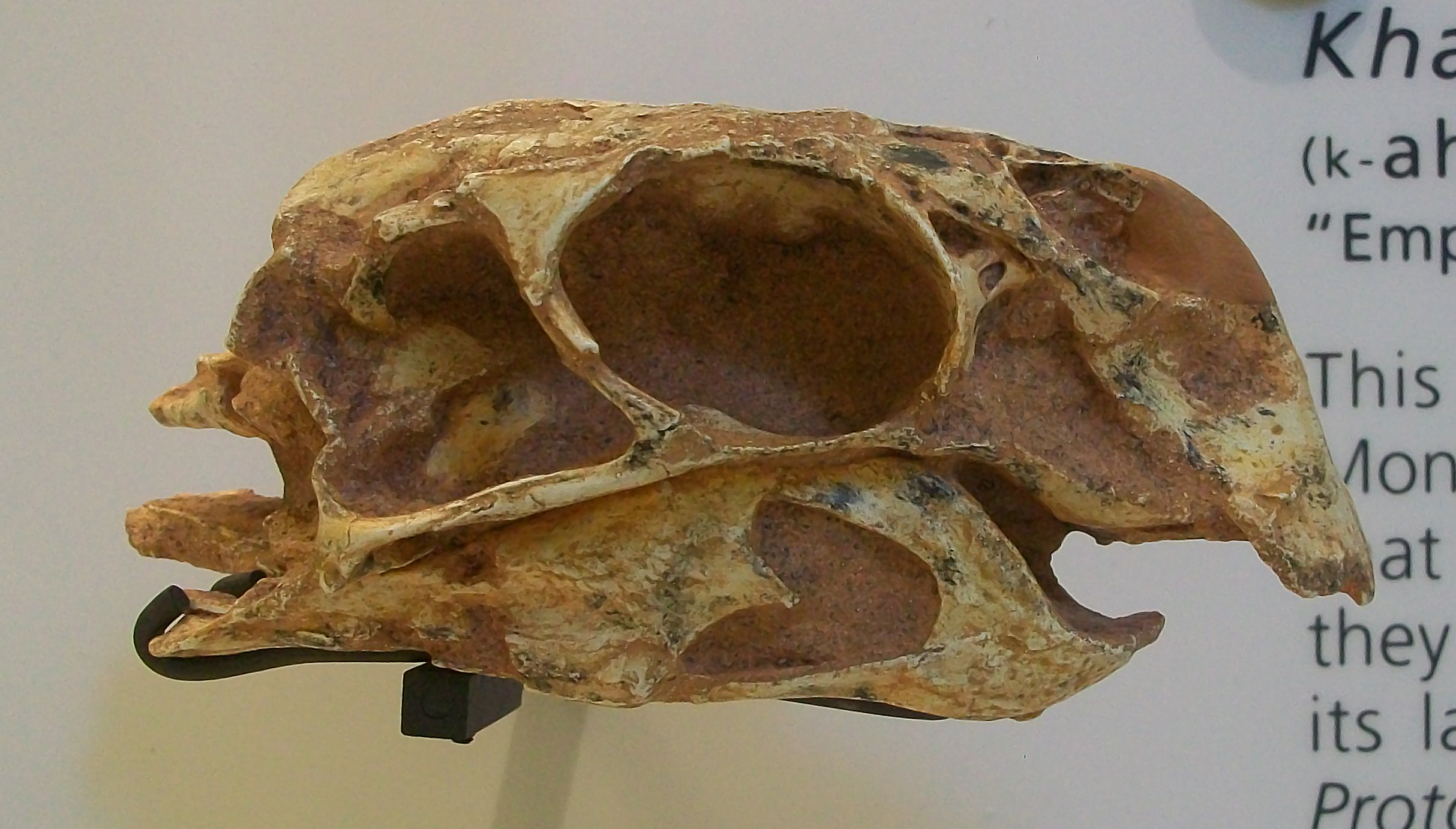
Skull of referred specimen IGM 100/973

According to a 2014 study published in Nature, Khaan was possibly sexually dimorphic. Two specimens, the holotype MPC-D 100/1127 and referred specimen MPC-D 100/1002, were analyzed, the dimorphic feature being in the anterior chevrons. Both specimens were of the same size and build, and thus were likely the same age, ruling out ontogeny. In MPC-D 100/1127, the anterior chevrons showed great similarity to those of other theropods, with no great expansion on the distal end. However, in the other individual, the chevrons had a "heel"-like expansion above the distal end, which increased in size along the sequence. The study ruled out a possibly pathologic explanation, finding sexual dimorphism to have more support. It was thought that the reduced spines were a female characteristic, because they would increase space for laying eggs. Also, the larger spines could be for male muscle attachments, which would support a tail fan.

A 2022 study of the bite force of Khaan and comparisons with other oviraptorosaurs such as Incisivosaurus, Citipati, and Conchoraptor suggests that Khaan had a very strong bite force. The moderate jaw gape seen in oviraptorosaurs is indicative of herbivory in the majority of the group, but it is clear they were likely feeding on much tougher or more types of vegetation than other herbivorous theropods in their environment, such as ornithomimosaurs and therizinosaurs were able to. The examinations suggest oviraptorosaurs may have been powerful-biting generalists or specialists that partook of niche partitioning both in body size and cranial function.

== See also ==
- Timeline of oviraptorosaur research
