= Polyclonoolithus =

Polyclonoolithus Temporal range: Early Cretaceous

Egg fossil classification
- Basic shell type: †Dinosauroid-spherulitic
- Oofamily: †Polyclonoolithidae
- Oogenus: †Polyclonoolithus; Xie et al., 2016

Oospecies
- †P. yangjiagouensis Xie et al., 2016 (type)

Dinosaur egg

Polyclonoolithus is an oogenus of fossil dinosaur egg. It is from the Early Cretaceous of Gansu, China. They have distinctive, branching eggshell units, which may represent the original form of spheroolithids.

== Distribution ==
Polyclonoolithus is known exclusively from Yangjiagou, a small town in Gansu. The only known fossil specimen is from the Lower Cretaceous Hekou Group, part of the larger Lanzhou-Minhe Basin.

== Discovery ==
Dinosaur body fossils and ichnites are common at the Hekou Group, but fossilized eggs are rare. The first fossil eggs found there were collected by Chinese Academy of Geological Sciences in Zhongpu in 2009, but were never formally described. In 2012, a team of paleontologists from the Gansu Geological Museum, the Institute of Vertebrate Paleontology and Paleoanthropology and the Institute of Geology once again discovered fossil eggs in the Lanzhou-Minhe Basin. In 2016, their discovery was described as a new oogenus and oospecies, Polyclonoolithus yangjiagouensis, by Chinese paleontologists Xie Jun-Fang, Zhang Shu-Kang, Jin Xing-Sheng, Li Da-Qing, and Zhou Ling-Qi.

== Description ==
Polyclonoolithus is only known from one specimen: ZMNH M1849, an incomplete egg (made up of several fragments) housed in the Zhejiang Museum of Natural History. Due to the poor preservation, the size and shape of a complete egg are unknown, but Polyclonoolithus was likely less than 10 centimetres (3.9 in) in diameter. The eggshell ranges from 1.84 to 2.05 millimetres (0.072 to 0.081 in) in thickness. The cone layer has radiating structure and makes up roughly 1/7 the total width of the eggshell.

Polyclonoolithus is distinctive for having branching shell units, with irregular pore canals between them. The branches of the eggshell units fuse together towards the outer surface of the shell.

== Parataxonomy ==
Polyclonoolithus is classified in its own oofamily, Polyclonoolithidae. Its branching eggshell units set it apart from all other oofamilies, except for Dendroolithidae, Dictyoolithidae, and Similifaveoloolithidae. It lacks the reticulate structure seen in dictyoolithids, and unlike similifaveoloolithids and dendroolithids, the eggshell units vary in thickness. It furthermore differs from dendroolithids in that the eggshell units are not totally fused together at the outer surface of the eggshell, however this could only be due to erosion.

There is also some similarity between the branching eggshell units of Polyclonoolithus to the superimposed eggshell units found in Spheroolithidae, leading to the hypothesis by Xie et al. that the shell units of polyclonoolithids may represent a primitive form of those found in spheroolithids.

Polyclonoolithus contains only a single oospecies: P. yangjiagouensis.
