= Coralloidoolithus =

Coralloidoolithus Temporal range: Late Cretaceous

Egg fossil classification
- Basic shell type: †Dinosauroid-spherulitic
- Oofamily: †Stalicoolithidae
- Oogenus: †Coralloidoolithus; Wang, Wang, Zhao & Jiang, 2012

Oospecies
- †C. shizuiwanensis

Oogenus of dinosaur egg

Coralloidoolithus is an oogenus of dinosaur egg from the Tiantai Basin in Zhejiang Province, containing a single known oospecies C. shizuiwanensis. Formerly, it was classified in the oogenus Paraspheroolithus; however, it was considered sufficiently different to be classified in its own genus. C. shizuiwanensis is similar to Stalicoolithus, leading to their classification in the same family, Stalicoolithidae.

== History ==
Xixia County was first excavated for fossils by a Geological Team of the Henan Geological Bureau in 1974. Fossils continued to be excavated there, but were not extensively studied until 1994 when Fang et al. received funding from the National Natural Science Foundation of China. Under this sponsorship, with support of the Geological Profession Foundation and the Geological Science Item Foundation of MGMR, a multidisciplinary team of Chinese paleontologists took on the task of analyzing the geology and paleontology of these eggs. In 1998, Fang et al. described numerous new ootaxa, including the oospecies "Paraspheroolithus" shizuiwanensis.

Further specimens were uncovered in Tiantai in 2000; these were referred to "P." cf. shizuiensis. In 2012 multiple complete and near-complete eggs were discovered in Tiantai by the Chinese paleontologists Wang Qiang, Wang Xiaolin, Zhao Zikui, and Jiang Yan'gen. They named a new oogenus, Coralloidoolithus, for P. shizuiwanensis, and referred several of their newly discovered specimens to C. shizuiwanensis. They also synonymized this oospecies with the Mongolian Dendroolithus microporosus and Spheroolithus oosp. from South Korea based on similarities in microstructure.

== Description ==
The first specimens discovered were only fragments, but based on impressions they were estimated to be 5–6 cm (2.0–2.4 in) in diameter. The complete eggs discovered in Tiantai are larger, ranging from 8.72 to 10.38 cm (3.43 to 4.09 in) in length by 6.85 to 9.24 cm (2.70 to 3.64 in) wide. They are roughly spherical. Wang et al. (2012) described them as having a rough surface, but the original "P." shizuiwanensis specimens were noted by Fang et al. to have a smooth surface. Dendroolithus macroporosus and the Spheroolithus specimens referred to C. shizuiwanensis are also smooth-shelled.

Coralloidoolithus's shell is typically about 2.6 mm thick. It has similar microstructures to the other stalicoolithids; it has a very thin cone layer (the inner layer of the eggshell), making up only about 1/10 of the eggshell's thickness, and its columnar layer is divided into three zones. Secondary shell units make up the outermost of these zones and also fill many of the pore canals. The middle zone is characterized by light and dark bands and the innermost zone of the columnar layer has horizontal growth lines. Its pores are irregular and meandering. Coralloidoolithus can be distinguished from Stalicoolithus by having a thinner eggshell and by having fewer secondary shell units. Shixingoolithus is larger than Coralloidoolithus and has a thicker cone layer.

== Distribution ==
Coralloidoolithus shizuiwanensis is found at several Upper Cretaceous sites, including at the Sangping Formation in Xixia County, Henan and at the Chichengshan Formation Tiantai County, Zhejiang. Also, specimens found in the Gobi Desert and in Bosung County, Chullanam-do Province, South Korea have been referred to this oospecies.

== Classification ==
Coralloidoolithus is a monotypic oogenus containing only C. shizuiwanensis. It is classified alongside Stalicoolithus and Shixingoolithus in the oofamily Stalicoolithidae.

== See also ==
- List of dinosaur oogenera
