= Shixingoolithus =

Shixingoolithus Temporal range: Maastrichtian

Egg fossil classification
- Basic shell type: †Dinosauroid-spherulitic
- Oofamily: †Stalicoolithidae
- Oogenus: †Shixingoolithus; Zhao et al., 1991

Oospecies
- †S. erbeni; †S. qianshanensis

Dinosaur egg

Shixingoolithus is an oogenus of dinosaur egg from the Cretaceous of Nanxiong, China.

== Description ==
Shixingoolithus eggs are nearly spherical, and about 12 cm in diameter, with a shell thickness of 2.3–2.6 mm. The shell is made up of tall, prismatic units, and has narrow, irregular pore canals. Its cone layer (mammillae) is approximately a fourth of the shell thickness.

== Paleobiology ==
Shixingoolithus probably represents eggs of an ornithopod dinosaur. They are known from the Pingling Formation and Chishan Formation (from the Upper Maastrichtian), but are absent from the Yuanpu Formation, indicating that they disappeared in the last 200,000 to 300,000 years of the Cretaceous.

== Parataxonomy ==
Shixingoolithus was initially described as a member of the Spheroolithidae on the basis of its spherical shape, and similarities to other spheroolithid eggs. In 2012, Wang et al. classified Shixingoolithus in a new oofamily, Stalicoolithidae, alongside Stalicoolithus and Coralloidoolithus, because of the secondary eggshell units found in its pore canals. However, these secondary shell units may in fact simply be taphonomic artifacts. It has also been speculated to in fact be a dendroolithid, but a more complete description must be made before its classification can be resolved.

== See also ==
- List of dinosaur oogenera
