= Egg taphonomy =

Study of the decomposition and fossilization of eggs

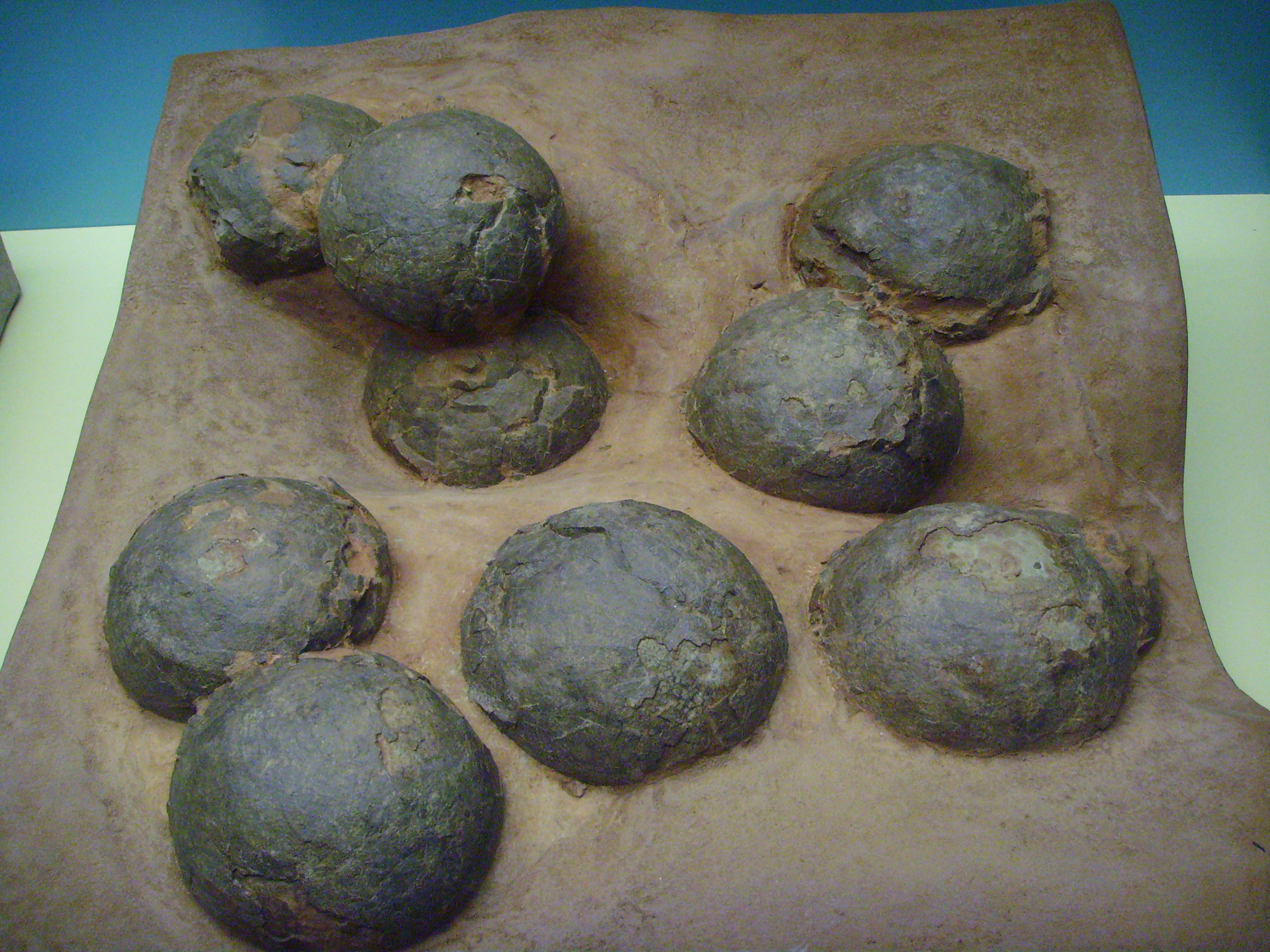
Oolithes spheroides

Egg taphonomy is the study of the decomposition and fossilization of eggs. The processes of egg taphonomy begin when the egg either hatches or dies. Eggshell fragments are robust and can often travel great distances before burial. More complete egg specimens gradually begin to fill with sediment, which hardens as minerals precipitate out of water percolating through pores or cracks in the shell. Throughout the fossilization process the calcium carbonate composing the eggshell generally remains unchanged, allowing scientists to study its original structure. However, egg fossils buried under sediments at great depth can be subjected to heat, pressure and chemical processes that can alter the structure of its shell through a process called diagenesis.

== Laying and burial ==
The formation of fossil eggs begins with the original egg itself. Not all eggs that end up fossilizing experience the death of their embryo beforehand. Even eggs that successfully hatch can fossilize. In fact, not only is this possible it's actually common. Many fossil dinosaur eggs are preserved with their tops broken open by the escaping hatchling. Of course not all open fossil eggs made it to a happy ending. Some contain fossil feces (known formally as coprolites) left by the larvae of scavenging insects like flies. Dinosaur eggs may have been the victim of the same causes of mortality suffered by modern bird and reptile eggs, like asphyxiation due to overly deep burial, congenital health problems, dehydration, disease, drowning, and inimical temperatures. After hatching or death the processes of decomposition and/or preservation begin. As noted, insects can be among the first scavengers of a dead egg, but deeply buried specimens may not be accessible to them and will be decomposed solely by bacteria and fungi. Whether or not hatching was successful, water and wind would fill the egg with sediment through any large openings. Not all fossil egg specimens are of complete specimens, though. According to egg paleontologist Kenneth Carpenter, individual pieces of eggshell are much more robust than the entire egg. This strength comes from the organic matter that cements the eggshell's calcite crystals together. Simple experiments have demonstrated that under certain conditions eggshell can be transported for 68 kilometers or 42 miles with little loss of size. The durability of eggshell under transport means that pieces of fossil eggshell aren't necessarily discovered in deposits geographically close to the nest they originated from.

== Preservation ==
More complete eggs in the process of fossilization are gradually buried until the weight of the sediment overtop them causes them to crack. These cracks allow even more sediments to fill the eggs. Sometimes, though, fossilization can begin fast enough to prevent the eggs from being cracked. This process involves acids like those formed from plant decomposition in the soil or the formation of carbonic acid from atmospheric carbon dioxide and rain water. The acids dissolve minerals like calcite out of limestone. During conditions of high watertable these dissolved minerals can enter the egg through its pores or cracks and precipitate out of solution. If enough minerals make it inside the egg can become sturdy enough to withstand the weight of the overlying sediments.

When the egg is buried deeply enough, the bacteria decomposing the egg are cut off from oxygen and begin to power their metabolisms using different energy sources. These processes can result in certain minerals being precipitated out of the groundwater selectively. The bacteria also dispose of metabolic waste using ions. Ken Carpenter observes that one common method links CO_{2} to Ca2+ ions to produce calcium carbonate. Some of the bacteria involved in the decay process use the conversion of nitrogento ammonia to power their metabolisms. When this ammonia leaks out of the egg it raises the surrounding pH into the alkaline and can change what minerals will precipitate out of the water. The organic material in the eggshell itself can lead to the precipitation of calcite out of solution. This often causes fossil eggshell to be covered in a thin layer of calcite that complicates the identification process. However, since eggshells are usually chiefly composed of calcite anyway the eggshell itself is mostly composed of the original calcite it had in life. The lack of change in composition and structure despite undergoing fossilization allows scientists to study the original structure of the shell.

=== Depositional environments ===
Beach sands: In northeastern Spain is a deposit of beach sands estimated to be home to over 300,000 fossil eggs. According to paleontologist Ken Carpenter these eggs were laid by sauropod dinosaurs who chose the site based on how easy beach sand would be to dig nests into and because such sands would absorb enough heat to help incubate the eggs.

Floodplains: Carpenter has also described the mudstones deposited in ancient floodplain environments as one of the best places to find fossils of dinosaur eggs. Dinosaurs would bury their eggs on the floodplain where the periodic floodwaters would carry the sediments that would bury and preserve the egg.

Sand dunes: Many dinosaur eggs have been preserved in sandstone formed from the sands of ancient deserts in modern Mongolia and northern China. The presence of Oviraptor preserved in their life brooding position suggests that sandstorms may have been the primary way that the eggs found in the deposits were buried.

Seafloor: Fossil eggs are known from sedimentary rocks deposited in marine environments. Turtle eggs are known from the marine White Limestone, Stonesfield Slate, and Mooreville Chalk. Other marine fossil eggs are known from the Oxford Clay and Gault Clay, although scientists don't know what kind of animals laid them. No modern reptile is known to lay their eggs on the seafloor, so these eggs likely originated in a different environmental setting. Ken Carpenter notes that while it's not possible to be completely sure how these eggs ended up on the seabed, some possibilities include carcasses of dead gravidfemales being washed out to sea and releasing its eggs when by splitting open, carried out to sea by floods, or drifting out on mats of vegetation.

Volcanic debris: Fossil eggs have been found in volcanic debris deposits although not lava deposits. At least two clutched of hard-shelled turtle eggs preserved in this manner are known from the Canary Islands. These eggs were likely buried in the debris by large tortoises. Not all volcanic debris deposits are capable of preserving eggs, however, because acids in these sediments can dissolve eggshell.

== Alteration ==
After burial eggs can still be altered. This process is called diagenesis. Turtle eggs are especially prone to diagenetic changes because their shells are made of aragonite rather than the more typical form of calcite composing the eggshells of other reptile groups. Aragonite is unstable, so heat and pressure can convert it into the more stable form of calcite. One common form of diagenesis affecting fossil turtle eggs is the conversion of aragonite, which is unstable, into the regular calcite characterizing other kinds of reptile eggs, which makes them difficult to identify. In eggs laid by other types of reptile, the pressure from being buried imposes a cross-hatched pattern on the calcite when viewed through a microscope. In more extreme cases the eggshell's internal structure can be obliterated completely. Silica can be incorporated into fossil eggshells, but this process is damaging to the shell's internal structure due to the difference in size between silica molecules and the calcite molecules. In addition to calcite and silica other minerals can be present in small amounts in fossil eggs, especially iron. Iron sometimes tints eggshell black, possibly when the iron is in the form of iron sulfide or pyrite. Iron can also tint eggs a reddish color when in the form of iron oxide, or hematite.

== See also ==
- Timeline of egg fossil research
