= Fish egg fossil =

Preserved remains of fish eggs

The fossilized remains of fish eggs have an extensive record going at least as far back as the Devonian and spanning into the Cenozoic era. The eggs of many different fish taxa have contributed to this record, including lobe-finned fish, placoderms, and sharks. Occasionally eggs are preserved still within the mother's body, or associated with fossil embryos. Some fossil eggs possibly laid by fish cannot be confidently distinguished from those laid by amphibians; for example, the ichnogenus Mazonova is known from impressions of eggs which resemble eggs of both fish and amphibians. Paleontologist B.K. Hall has observed that the discovery of fossil fish eggs, embryos and larvae link the sciences of paleontology with evo-devo.

== Fish taxa known from egg fossils ==
=== Cartilaginous fishes ===
Fossilized egg cases that may have been laid by an elasmobranch or chimaeroid are known from as far back as the Devonian period. Egg sacs that can more confidently be referred to those taxa are known from the Carboniferous to Oligocene, although no embryos are known from these.

Shark eggs have been recognized in the fossil record. More than thirty fossil shark egg cases have been discovered at the Bear River Seep Deposit of Washington state in the US. These capsules are up to 5 cm in length and resemble those of modern catshark species in the genus Apristurus. Since fossil teeth attributable to this genus go back to the late Eocene epoch, an ancient Apristurus species might very well be the mother of the fossil egg cases. A less likely candidate mother would be the genus Scyliorhinus, which also has a fossil record stretching back to the Eocene. However, modern Scyliorhinus egg capsules are smoother than the Bear River Seep Deposit fossils, casting doubt on this possibility.

=== Lobe-finned fishes ===
Some well-preserved embryos have been found with yolk sacs in the Carboniferous actinistian Rhabdoderma exiguum. These range in development from specimens still inside the egg to individuals who had partially resorbed their yolk sac. These specimens were part of the Mazon Creek fauna of Illinois.

=== Placoderms ===
One possible specimen of the Devonian placoderm Cowralepis mclachlani contained many unhatched egg sacs.

== Confounding factors ==
Some fossil eggs possibly laid by fish can't be confidently distinguished from those laid by amphibians. Examples are known from various Carboniferous and Triassic lagerstatten that preserve the eggs of aquatic vertebrates. The identity of the fossils' egglayers can't be confidently ascertained.

== See also ==
- Cephalopod egg fossil
- Paleontology in the United States
- Paleontology in Washington (state)
- Reptile egg fossil
- Timeline of egg fossil research
