= Cephalopod egg fossil =

Fossilized remains of cephalopod eggs

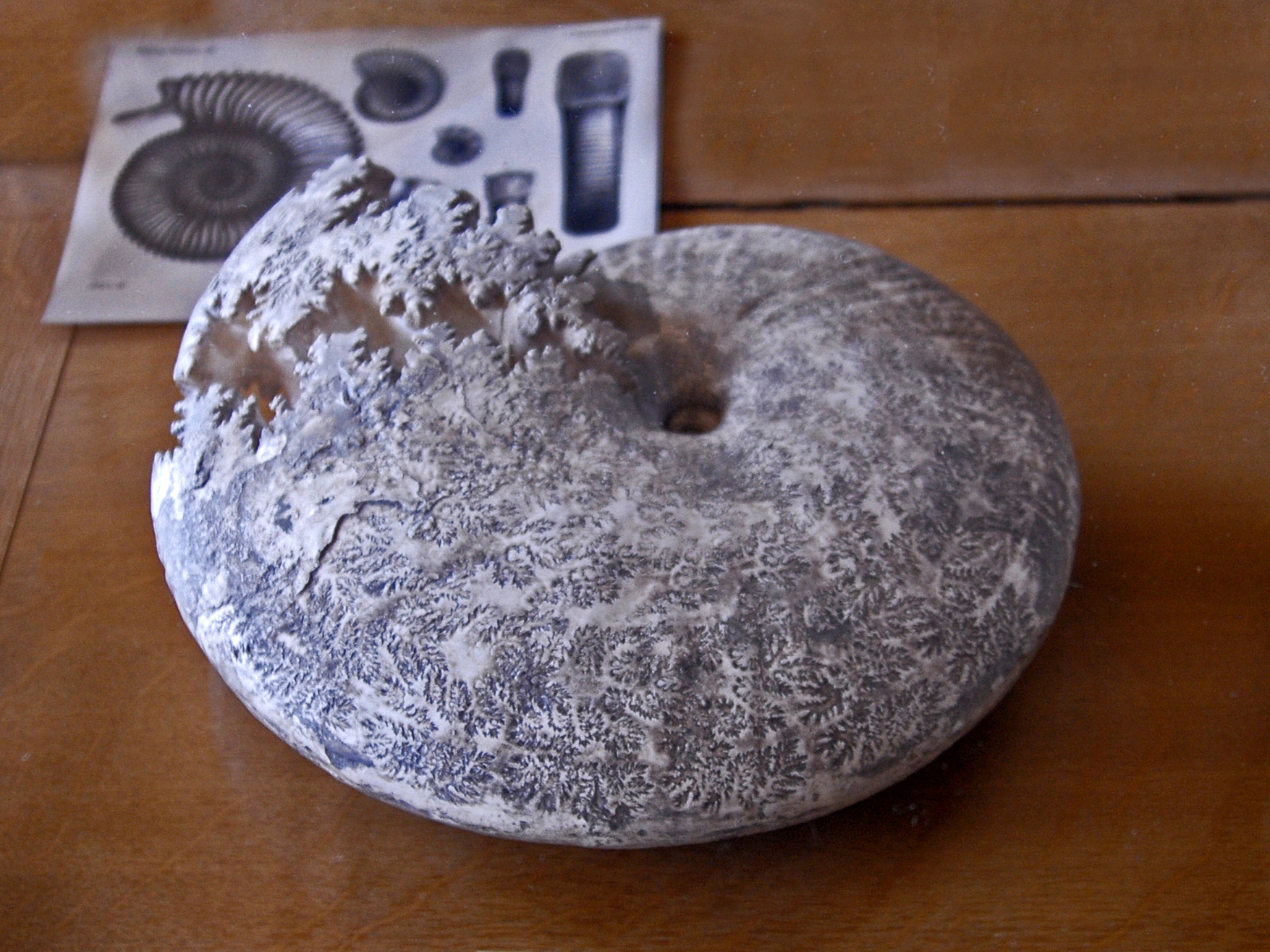
Possible Aulacostephanus eggs have been reported from the Kimmeridge Clay of England

Cephalopod egg fossils are the fossilized remains of eggs laid by cephalopods. The fossil record of cephalopod eggs is scant since their soft, gelatinous eggs decompose quickly and have little chance to fossilize. Eggs laid by ammonoids are the best known and only a few putative examples of these have been discovered. The best preserved of these were discovered in the Jurassic Kimmeridge Clay of England. Currently no belemnoid egg fossils have ever been discovered although this may be because scientists have not properly searched for them rather than an actual absence from the fossil record.

== Taphonomy ==
Ammonite eggs in well-aerated sea bottoms probably would have quickly been broken down by scavengers and aerobic bacteria. Fossil evidence supports this general idea since swarms of hatchling ammonitellae fossils are known although there are no associated egg fossils. One of the eggs preserved in the Kimmeridge Clay ammonite egg cluster K1486 bears crystalline phosphate on its surface. Since phosphate is mobile only in organic form this suggests the eggs were already decaying before fossilization. The fact that the ammonite eggs survived decomposition to become fossilized suggests two possibilities. The first is that the eggs were transported from the well-aerated location they were originally laid in to low-oxygen waters near the sea floor. The second possibility is that the eggs were laid in waters whose oxygen abundance varied, possibly by season.

== Cephalopod taxa ==
=== Ammonoids ===
Multiple instances of fossil ammonite eggs have been observed in the fossil record. However, prior to 2009 only two credible examples of ammonite eggs had been reported to the scientific literature. The first was an apparent clutch of eggs preserved in the sediment that filled in the living chamber of a harpoceratid dating back to the Toarcian age of the Jurassic period. This specimen was discovered in a concretion incorporated into glacial drift that came from the Baltic region. The ammonite itself was a fully grown individual with a macroconch shell. The second possible example was another adult macroconch of Ceratites from the Muschelkalk of Germany, which dated to the Upper Anisian of the Triassic period. An additional less plausible case has been reported from Kamchatka where an egg clutch was purportedly associated with a Desmophyllites dating back to the early Triassic. However a later summary of ammonite embryos from the same age and location does not mention any eggs being known and Desmophyllites is a Late Cretaceous genus, so this report is not reliable.

The first two possible ammonite egg specimens were found in sediments filling the interior of the body chambers of ammonite shells. Lehmann's specimen from the Lias, reported in 1966, was a pouch of about 50 empty egg capsules lying in the innermost part of a mature macroconch's body chamber. The specimen was not filled with sediment, but rather crystalline calcite. The eggsac had been carbonized completely, destroying its fine detail. Other than the eggs, the specimen does not preserve any of the ammonite's soft parts. The eggs preserved within this shell probably did not belong to the shell's occupant since the eggs probably would have been removed with the rest of the body. The shell itself of Lehmann's specimen belonged to the genus Eleganticeras. The researchers described the other specimen, reported by Muller in 1969 from the Trias, as a "carbonized ghost" that preserved very little detail, not even showing signs of individual egg capsules. Its outline was a similar shape to an axe-head, like Lehmann's. The specimen was within the sedimentary infill of a mature macroconch. There were no sign of any other soft parts. The egg sac is positioned near the opening and oriented in a way that might suggest it was attached to the shell. These specimens have been used to support the contention that macroconch ammonite shells were those of females. Apart from these specimens this would just be a general assumption.

In 2009, Steve Etches, Jane Clarke, and John Callomon reported the discovery of eight clusters of ammonite eggs in the Lower and Upper Kimmeridge Clay of the Dorset Coast in England. The fossil sites were within the Jurassic Coast World Heritage Site. The eggs are subspherical to spherical in shape. Some are isolated but some were also found in association with the shells of perisphinctid ammonites. They were interpreted by the researchers as ammonite eggs sacks and are the best preserved specimens of such known to science. The parents of the egg sacks are thought to be two local ammonite genera co-occurring with the eggs, Aulacostephanus and Pectinatites.

The Kimmeridge Clay cephalopod eggs are regarded as ammonite eggs based on "strong" circumstantial evidence. These spawning grounds were sometimes small geographic areas that were used continuously for long periods of time. Ammonite taxa that remained in one place for a long period of time are called "eudemic" to that place. This leaves the most probable identity of the egglayers as Aulacostephanus and Pectinatites since they were the ammonites eudemic to the region at the time the egg fossils formed. The researchers described the Kimmeridge Clay ammonite eggs as offering "the best insights so far" into the embryonic phase of the ammonite life cycle. Since the Kimmeridge Clay is so thoroughly studied the environment and depositional context is better understood for these ammonite eggs than those reported in the previous two examples. The eggs provide evidence that ammonites had similar life cycles to modern neritic cephalopods.

=== Belemnoids ===
Unlike ammonites, no eggs of belemnites are currently known from the fossil record, although Steve Etches, Jane Clarke, and John Callomon have observed that this may be due to a lack of people actually looking for them.

== See also ==
- Egg fossil
- Fish egg fossil
- Reptile egg fossil
- Timeline of egg fossil research
