= Timeline of egg fossil research =

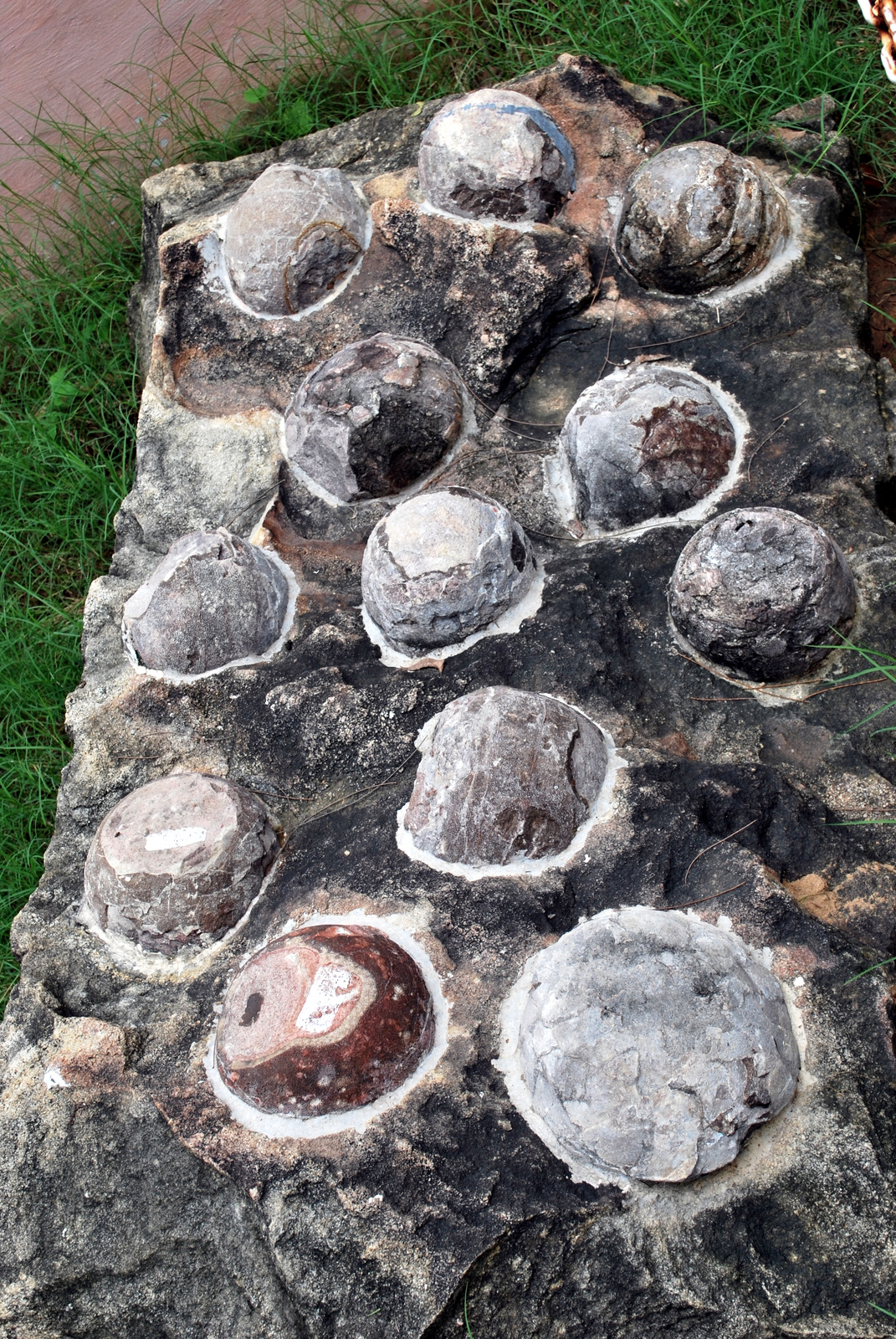
Fossilized Dinosaur eggs displayed at Indroda Dinosaur and Fossil Park.

This timeline of egg fossils research is a chronologically ordered list of important discoveries, controversies of interpretation, taxonomic revisions, and cultural portrayals of egg fossils. Humans have encountered egg fossils for thousands of years. In Stone Age Mongolia, local peoples fashioned fossil dinosaur eggshell into jewelry. In the Americas, fossil eggs may have inspired Navajo creation myths about the human theft of a primordial water monster's egg. Nevertheless, the scientific study of fossil eggs began much later. As reptiles, dinosaurs were presumed to have laid eggs from the 1820s on, when their first scientifically documented remains were being described in England. In 1859, the first scientifically documented dinosaur egg fossils were discovered in southern France by a Catholic priest and amateur naturalist named Father Jean-Jacques Pouech, however he thought they were laid by giant birds.

The first scientifically recognized dinosaur egg fossils were discovered serendipitously in 1923 by an American Museum of Natural History crew while looking for evidence of early humans in Mongolia. These eggs were mistakenly attributed to the locally abundant herbivore Protoceratops, but are now known to be Oviraptor eggs. Egg discoveries continued to mount all over the world, leading to the development of multiple competing classification schemes. In 1975 Chinese paleontologist Zhao Zi-Kui started a revolution in fossil egg classification by developing a system of "parataxonomy" based on the traditional Linnaean system to classify eggs based on their physical qualities rather than their hypothesized mothers. Zhao's new method of egg classification was hindered from adoption by Western scientists due to language barriers. However, in the early 1990s Russian paleontologist Konstantin Mikhailov brought attention to Zhao's work in the English language scientific literature.

== Prescientific ==
=== Late Paleolithic to early Neolithic ===
- Mongolians fashioned fossil dinosaur eggshell into jewelry. Mongolia’s Flaming Cliffs are known as "one of the greatest dinosaur fossil sites the world has ever seen".

=== Precolumbian North America ===
- A common theme in Navajo stories about Water Monsters involve the human theft of Water Monster eggs or young and the angry Monsters pursuing humanity through a series of worlds. Stories like this influenced the Navajos to fear large fossil bones, which they felt shouldn't be disturbed, because doing so might awaken the enraged ghosts of the Water Monsters, who might resume their rampage with apocalyptic results. Stories like this may have been based on the discovery of fossil eggs in western North America. Fossil eggs and nests from this region that may have inspired the legend were left behind by creatures like possible aetosaurs, giant condors, duck-billed dinosaurs, possible phytosaurs, large theropods, and sea turtles.

== 19th-century paleontology ==
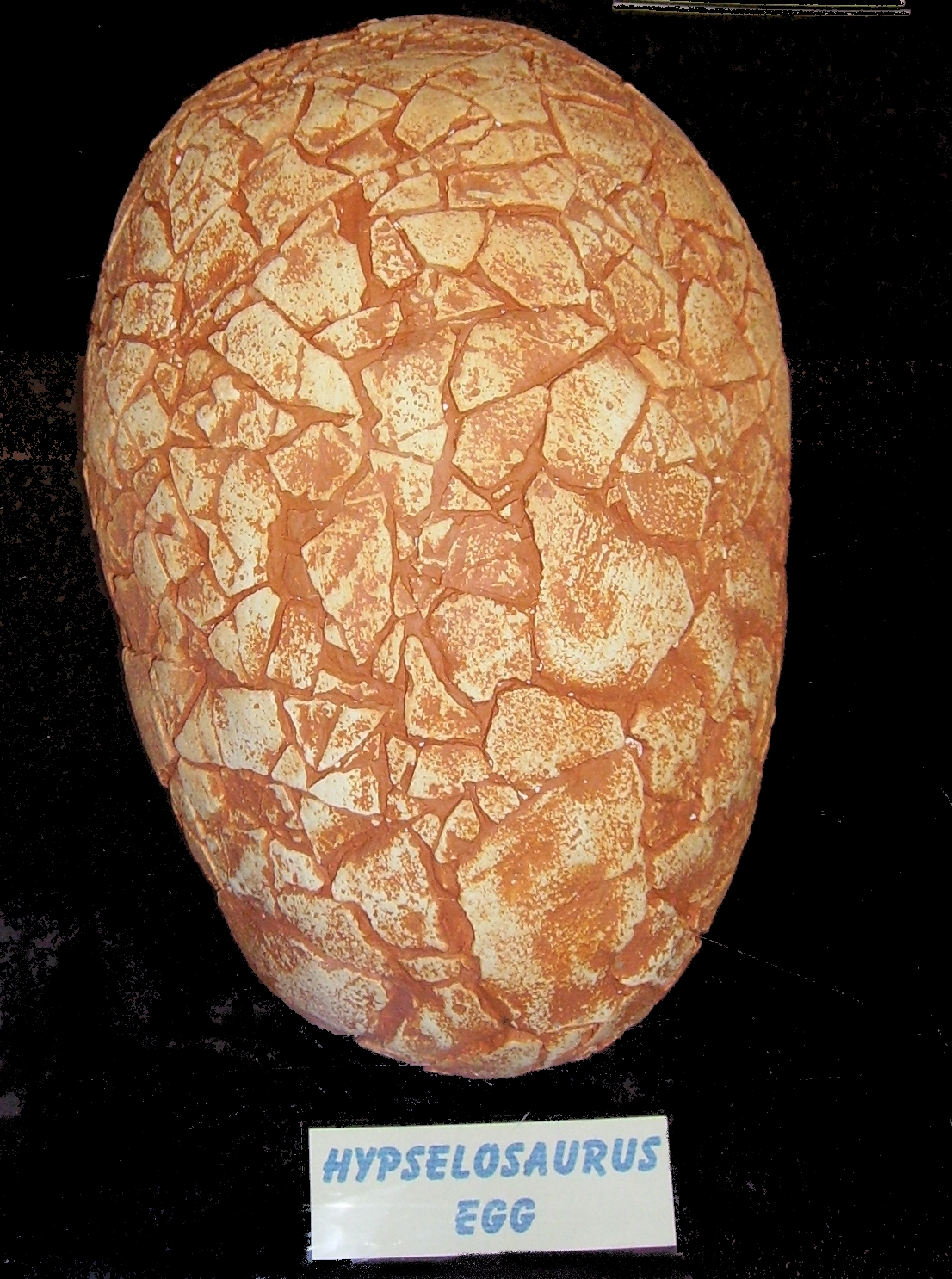
Hypselosaurus egg.

=== 1859 ===
- The first scientifically documented dinosaur egg fossils were discovered in southern France by a Catholic priest and amateur naturalist named Father Jean-Jacques Pouech. These fossils were large chunks of eggshell that date back to the Late Cretaceous. Pouech mistook them for the shell of a giant bird's eggs.

=== 1869 ===
- French geologist Philippe Matheron made a fossil discovery in the same general region as Pouech. Matheron discovered the fossil bones of an animal he named Hypselosaurus. Matheron thought Hypselosaurus to be a crocodile-like animal, but it is now recognized as a long-necked herbivorous sauropod dinosaur. Eggshell fossils were found associated with the remains. Matheron presented the shell fossils to the director of comparative anatomy at Paris' Natural History Museum, Paul Gervais. Gervais examined thin sections of the shell fossils and compared them with similar thin sections of eggs laid by modern birds and reptiles. He found them to be most similar to turtle eggs, but recognized that since dinosaur eggs had not yet been described scientifically, he could not rule out that possibility.

== 20th-century paleontology ==
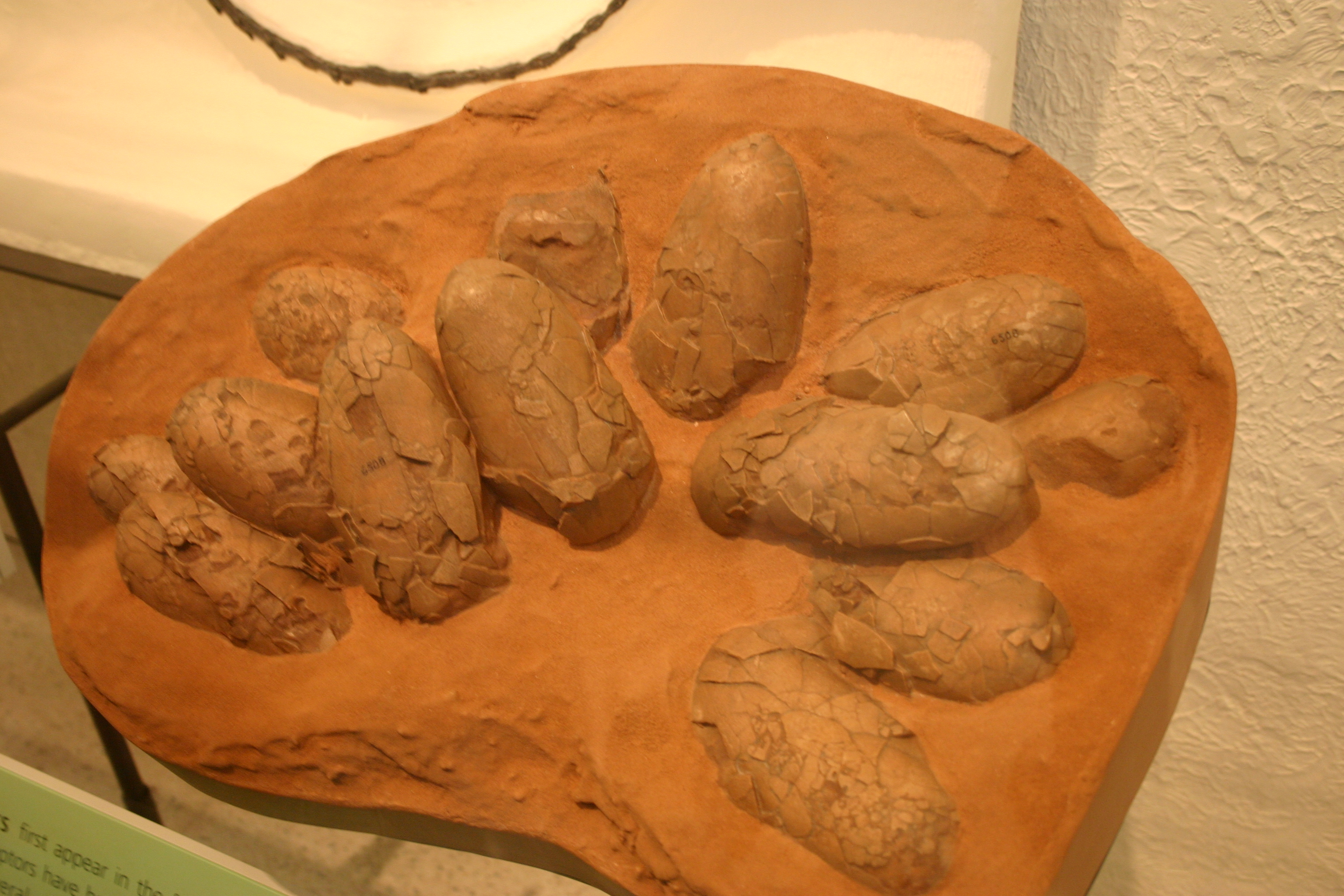
Fossilized nest specimen AMNH FR 6508, recovered from Mongolia during the Central Asiatic Expedition of 1923.

=== 1913 ===
- While prospecting on the Blackfoot Reservation of northern Montana on behalf of the National Museum of Natural History, Charles W. Gilmore found a deposit of apparent freshwater clam fossils. He collected samples, noted the location and photographed the site. These "clamshell" fossils were actually the first dinosaur eggshell collected by scientists in the United States.

=== 1919 ===
- Roy Chapman Andrews proposed the idea of a scientific expedition into central Asia to test Henry Fairfield Osborn's hypothesis that humanity originated in Asia.

=== 1922 ===
- 17 April: The Central Asiatic Expedition, led by Andrews, departed from Peking toward Mongolia.

=== 1923 ===
- 13 July: Over dinner, Central Asiatic Expedition member George Olsen claimed to have found fossil eggs. The other expedition members were skeptical, but Olsen took them to the site of his find. Expedition paleontologist W. Granger recognized them as dinosaur eggs, but mistakenly believed them to be the first ever discovered.

=== 1939 ===
- Alfred Sherwood Romer and Lewellyn Price described a 5.9 cm by 3.79 cm fossil egg from the Lower Permian as the oldest hard-shelled fossil egg. The composition of its shell would later be disputed, but if the fossil was correctly identified as a reptile egg it is the oldest known.

=== 1946 ===
- Summer: Soviet scientists embarked on an expedition to Mongolia retracing part of the journey taken by the Central Asiatic Expedition. They discovered many additional dinosaur eggs, some from previously undiscovered fossil sites.

=== 1957 ===
- The first scientifically documented dinosaur eggs from India were discovered by M. Sahni.

=== 1964 ===
- The first scientifically documented dinosaur eggshell from Canada was discovered on the banks of the Milk River in southern Alberta.

=== 1966 ===
- Paleontologist U. Lehman made the first plausible report of ammonite egg fossils in the scientific literature. The apparent clutch of eggs was preserved in the sediment that filled in the living chamber of a harboceratid dating back to the Toarcian age of the Jurassic period. The fossil itself was discovered in a concretion incorporated into glacial drift that came from the Baltic region. The shell containing the putative eggs was a fully grown individual with a macroconch shell.

=== 1969 ===
- Paleontologist A. H. Müller made the second plausible scientific report of fossil ammonite eggs. These eggs were associated with another adult macroconch, that of Ceratites from the Muschelkalk of Germany. The fossil dated to the Upper Anisian age of the Triassic period.

=== 1970 ===
- Jim Jensen reported the discovery of dinosaur eggshell in the Early Cretaceous Cedar Mountain Formation of eastern Utah.
- German paleontologist H. Erben was the first to use scanning electron microscopy to study dinosaur eggshell. The level of detail was so much higher than that seen through light microscopy that Erben referred to what he saw as the egg's "ultrastructure".
- Folinsbee and his colleagues became one of the first research teams to study dinosaur eggs using mass spectrometry. They found that the eggshell of fossil eggs they attributed to the dinosaur Protoceratops (actually Oviraptor) had more delta Oxygen 18 compared to delta Oxygen 16 in the calcium carbonate of their shell. This implies that the mother's drinking water had a higher percentage of the heavier oxygen in its water molecules due to evaporation, which meant the environment was hot.

They also found that the carbon in the eggshell is mostly the heavier Carbon 13 rather than the lighter Carbon 12. This means the dinosaur were primarily feeding on C3 plants which use 3 carbon atoms in their photosynthesis products rather than C4 plants that use four.

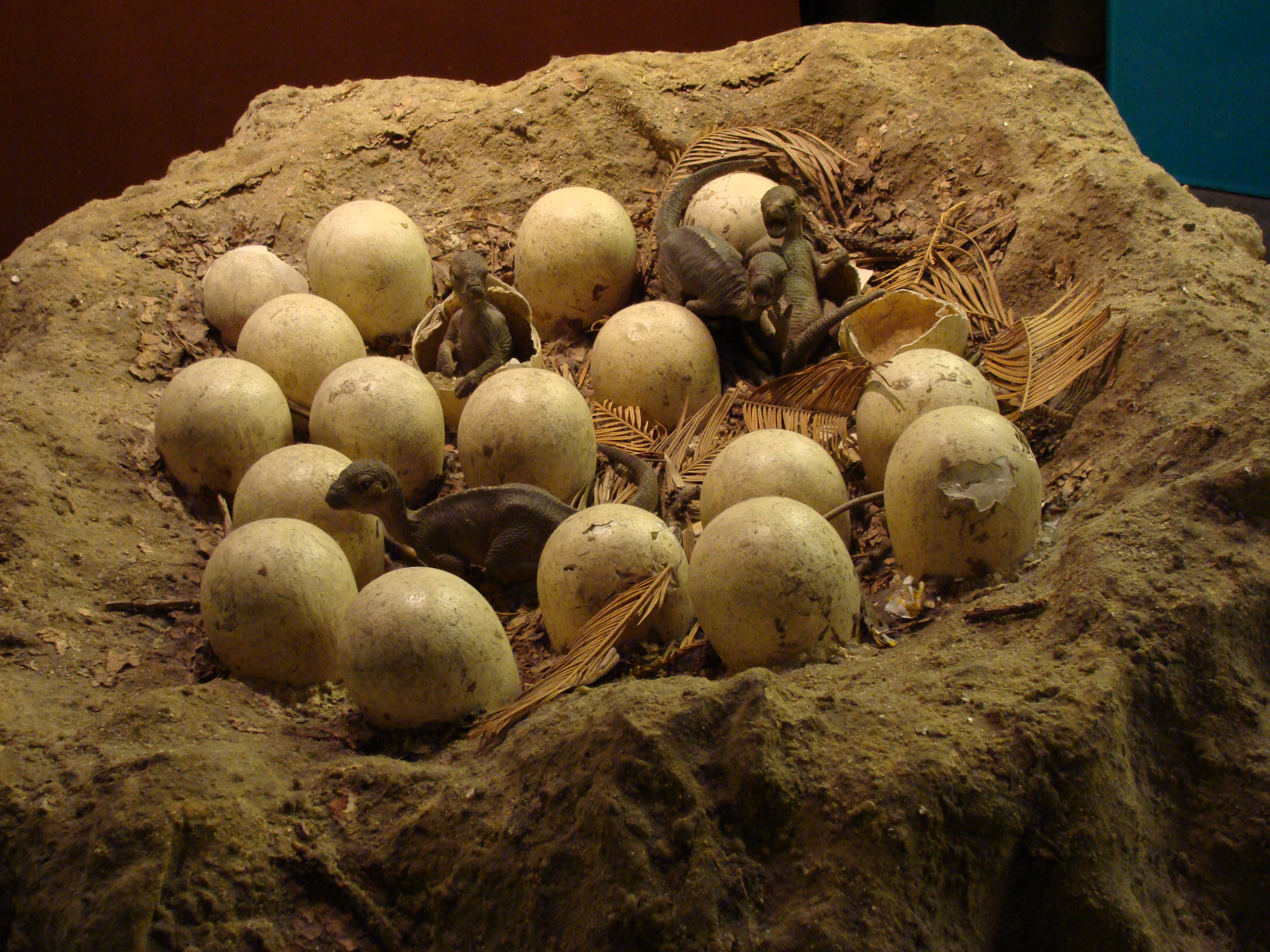
Reconstruction of a Maiasaura nest with eggs

=== 1975 ===
- Chinese paleontologist Zhao Zhi-Kui began developing the "parataxonomy" that serves as the basis for the scientific classification of fossil eggs.

=== 1978 ===
- Paleontologist Bill Clemens alerted fellow paleontologists Jack Horner and Bob Makela to the presence of unidentified dinosaur fossils in Bynum, Montana. While in town the owner of a local rock shop, Marion Brandvold, showed them two tiny bones of what Horner recognised as the remains of a baby duck-billed dinosaur. Horner also knew that this was an important find and convinced Brandvold to let him study her fossils at Princeton University. These fossilised baby Maiasaura were returned to Bynum and are now on display at the Montana Dinosaur Center. When in the early 2000s the fossils returned to Bynum, the name of The Montana Dinosaur Center was the Two Medicine Dinosaur Center. This important discovery led the next year to the Fran Tannenbaum discovery.

=== 1979 ===
- Fran Tannenbaum discovered the first whole dinosaur egg in North America at Egg Mountain, Montana
- Karl Hirsch disputed Romer and Price's claim to have discovered a Permian hard-shelled egg, since the fossil in question didn't show evidence for the calcite that should have composed the shell. Hirsch found enough phosphorus in the object's outer layer to propose that the fossil was actually an egg, with a leathery shell.
- Erben and others found isotope ratios of Carbon and Oxygen in French dinosaur eggs similar to those found in Mongolian dinosaur eggs by Folinsbee and others in 1970. The ratios are indicative of a diet of C3 plants and hot living conditions.

=== 1991 ===
- Jim Haywood and others were studying the nests of ground-nesting gulls buried by the Mount St. Helens eruption. They found that the volcanic ash was acidic enough to dissolve most of the eggshell in only two years.
- Sarkar found isotope ratios of Carbon and Oxygen in Indian dinosaur eggs similar to those found in Mongolian dinosaur eggs by Folinsbee and others in 1970. The ratios are indicative of a diet of C3 plants and hot living conditions.

=== Early to mid-1990s ===
- Russian paleontologist Konstantin Mikhailov brought attention to Zhao's classification system for egg fossil in the English language scientific literature.

== 21st-century paleontology ==
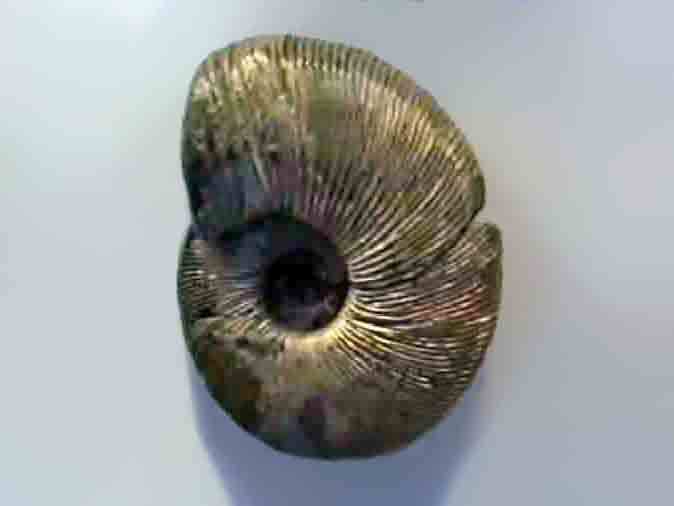
Pectinatites.

=== 2009 ===
- Steve Etches, Jane Clarke, and John Callomon reported the discovery of eight clusters of ammonite eggs in the Lower and Upper Kimmeridge Clay of the Dorset Coast in England. The eggs are subspherical to spherical in shape. Some are isolated but some were also found in association with the shells of perisphinctid ammonites. They were interpreted by the researchers as ammonite eggs sacks and are the best preserved specimens of such known to science. The parents of the egg sacks are thought to be two local ammonite genera co-occurring with the eggs, Aulacostephanus and Pectinatites.

=== 2019 ===
- A study on the structure of eggshells of eggs produced by Lufengosaurus, Massospondylus and Mussaurus, representing the oldest confirmed amniote eggshells reported so far, is published by Stein et al. (2019).
- Description of dinosaur egg fossils from the late Early Cretaceous Chaochuan Formation (Zhejiang, China) is published by Zhang et al. (2019), who name a new ootaxon Multifissoolithus chianensis.
- Dinosaurs eggs assigned to the oofamily Dendroolithidae are described from the Late Cretaceous Zhaoying Formation (China) by He et al. (2019), who name a new ootaxon Pionoolithus quyuangangensis.
- Dinosaurs eggs assigned to the oofamily Faveoloolithidae are described from the Upper Cretaceous (Coniacian–Santonian) siltstones within the Daeri Andesite of the Wido Volcanics (South Korea) by Kim et al. (2019), who name a new ootaxon Propagoolithus widoensis.

== See also ==
- Timeline of paleontology
