= Stalicoolithidae =

Stalicoolithidae Temporal range: Late Cretaceous

Egg fossil classification
- Basic shell type: †Dinosauroid-spherulitic
- Oofamily: †Stalicoolithidae; Wang, Wang, Zhao & Jiang, 2012

Oogenera
- Coralloidoolithus; Shixingoolithus?; Stalicoolithus

Oofamily of fossil eggs

Stalicoolithidae is an oofamily of fossil eggs.

== History ==
Stalicoolithid eggs were first discovered in 1971, but they were described initially as Dendroolithids, or as Spheroolithids, in the case of "Paraspheroolithus" shizuiwanensis and Shixingoolithus.

== Description ==
Stalicoolithids are distinguished from other oofamilies by several characteristics. Most significantly, they have secondary eggshell units in the outer zone, and three distinct subzones of the columnar layer. They have a unique mix of developmental characteristics, giving insight into the evolution of the amniotic eggshell.

== Parataxonomy ==
Stalicoolithidae contains at least three oogenera: Coralloidoolithus, Stalicoolithus, and Shixingoolithus. Shixingoolithus contains two oospecies: S. erbeni and S. qianshanensis. Also, the enigmatic Parvoblongoolithus could potentially be a stalicoolithid.
