= Reptile egg fossil =

Preserved remains of reptile eggs

Reptile egg fossils are the fossilized remains of eggs laid by reptiles. The fossil record of reptile eggs goes back at least as far as the Early Permian. However, since the earliest reptile eggs probably had soft shells with little preservation potential, reptilian eggs may go back significantly further than their fossil record. Many ancient reptile groups are known from egg fossils including crocodilians, dinosaurs, and turtles. Some ancient reptiles are known to have given live birth and are therefore not anticipated to have left behind egg fossils.

== Evolution and diversity ==
The earliest reptile eggshells probably had leathery membranes instead of hard shells. Eggs like this decay so quickly that fossilization is very unlikely. Therefore, the fossil record is too incomplete for scientists to determine what kinds of eggshell most fossil reptile groups had. A 5.9 cm by 3.79 cm fossil from the Lower Permian was described in 1939 by Alfred Romer and Lewellyn Price as the oldest hard-shelled fossil egg. However, in a 1979 paper, Karl Hirsch disputed Romer and Price's claim, since the fossil in question did not show evidence for a calcite shell. Hirsch found enough phosphorus in the object's outer layer to propose that the fossil was actually an egg with a leathery shell. If the contentious fossil really is a reptile egg, it is the oldest one known.

== Reptile groups with documented fossil eggs ==
=== Crocodilians ===
The earliest known fossil rigid eggs were laid by South African crocodilians during the Late Triassic or Early Jurassic. However, the rigid eggshell itself was probably much older than these specific fossils.

The oldest known fossil crocodilian eggs are from Early Cretaceous rocks of Galve, Spain. These eggs had microstructures identical to those of modern crocodiles. This suggests that once the crocodilian's rigid eggshell first evolved, it changed very little over time. Crocodilian eggshell is regarded as primitive because it only contains one type of calcite crystal and these crystals are arranged in "tight columns".

=== Dinosaurs ===
The eggs of the earliest dinosaurs are poorly known. The dinosaur eggshell was so resilient that it is the most common kind of egg fossil. Some theropod dinosaurs' eggshell microstructure are so similar to modern birds that it is almost impossible to distinguish the two. These very bird-like eggs are only referred to non-avian dinosaurs due to their size and age. Bird eggshell microstructure is complex and more similar to theropod dinosaurs than to crocodilians. The commonality in eggshell structure is more evidence that birds evolved from theropods.

=== Turtles ===
The oldest known semi-rigid fossil eggshells date to the Middle Jurassic of England. The egg specimen was originally called Oolithes bathonicae, but renamed Testudoflexoolithus. There are also semi-rigid turtle eggshells known from the Late Jurassic Morrison Formation of the western US. Fully rigid turtle eggshell is known from Late Jurassic strata in Portugal. Fossil turtle eggs are known from the marine White Limestone, Stonesfield Slate, and Mooreville Chalk formations. No modern reptile is known to lay their eggs on the seafloor, so these eggs likely originated in a different environmental setting. Ken Carpenter notes that while it is not possible to be completely sure how these eggs ended up on the seabed, some possibilities include carcasses of dead gravid females being washed out to sea and releasing its eggs by splitting open, carried out to sea by floods, or drifting out on mats of vegetation. At least two clutches of hard-shelled turtle eggs preserved in volcanic ash are known from the Canary Islands. These eggs were likely buried in the debris by large tortoises.

== See also ==
- Cephalopod egg fossil
- Fish egg fossil
- Timeline of egg fossil research
