= Phaceloolithus =

Phaceloolithus Temporal range: Late Cretaceous

Egg fossil classification
- Basic shell type: †Dinosauroid-spherulitic
- Oofamily: †Phaceloolithidae; Zeng & Zhang, 1979
- Oogenus: †Phaceloolithus; Zeng & Zhang, 1979

Oospecies
- †P. hunanensis Zeng & Zhang 1979 (type)

Oogenus of dinosaur egg

Phaceloolithus is an oogenus of dinosaur egg found in the Fenshui'ao Formation of the Dongting Basin of the Hunan Province of China. The eggs have a subspherical shape, measuring up to 168 mm on the long axis, and having a very thin shell.

== Distribution ==
Phaceloolithus is found at the Dongting Basin in Hunan. They are dated, on the basis of other fossil eggs, ostracods (seed shrimp), and charophytes (algae) found at the same site, to the late Cretaceous.

== Description ==
Phaceloolithus is nearly spherical, measuring 167–168 mm long and 140–150 mm across. The eggshell is very thin, measuring from 0.5 to 0.7 mm thick. Like most other non-avian dinosaur eggs, Phaceloolithus's shell is stratified into two layers: the prismatic layer on the outside, and the mammillary layer on the inside. The mammillae are compressed into groups of two or three, and the pore canals are well-developed.

== History ==
Phaceloolithus was first described as the sole species of the oofamily Phaceloolithidae in 1979 by Chinese paleontologists Zeng Demin and Zhang Jinjian, following its discovery in the Dongting basin of Hunan.

== Parataxonomy ==
While Phaceloolithus has always been considered an oospecies of Phaceloolithidae, there is dispute about whether or not this oofamily is synonymous with the later-named Dendroolithidae. The oofamilies were first synonymized by Fang et al. in 2003. This position was supported by Ribeiro et al. in 2014, but other authors have considered the two oofamilies distinct, and in his master's thesis, Daniel Barta argued against synonymy because the brevity of the description of Phaceloolithidae makes any further referrals to that oofamily uncertain. If the synonymy is correct, then Phaceloolithus would be a sister taxon to Dendroolithus and Paradendroolithus. If not, then Phaceloolithus would be the sole oogenus of Phaceloolithus.

== See also ==
- List of dinosaur oogenera
