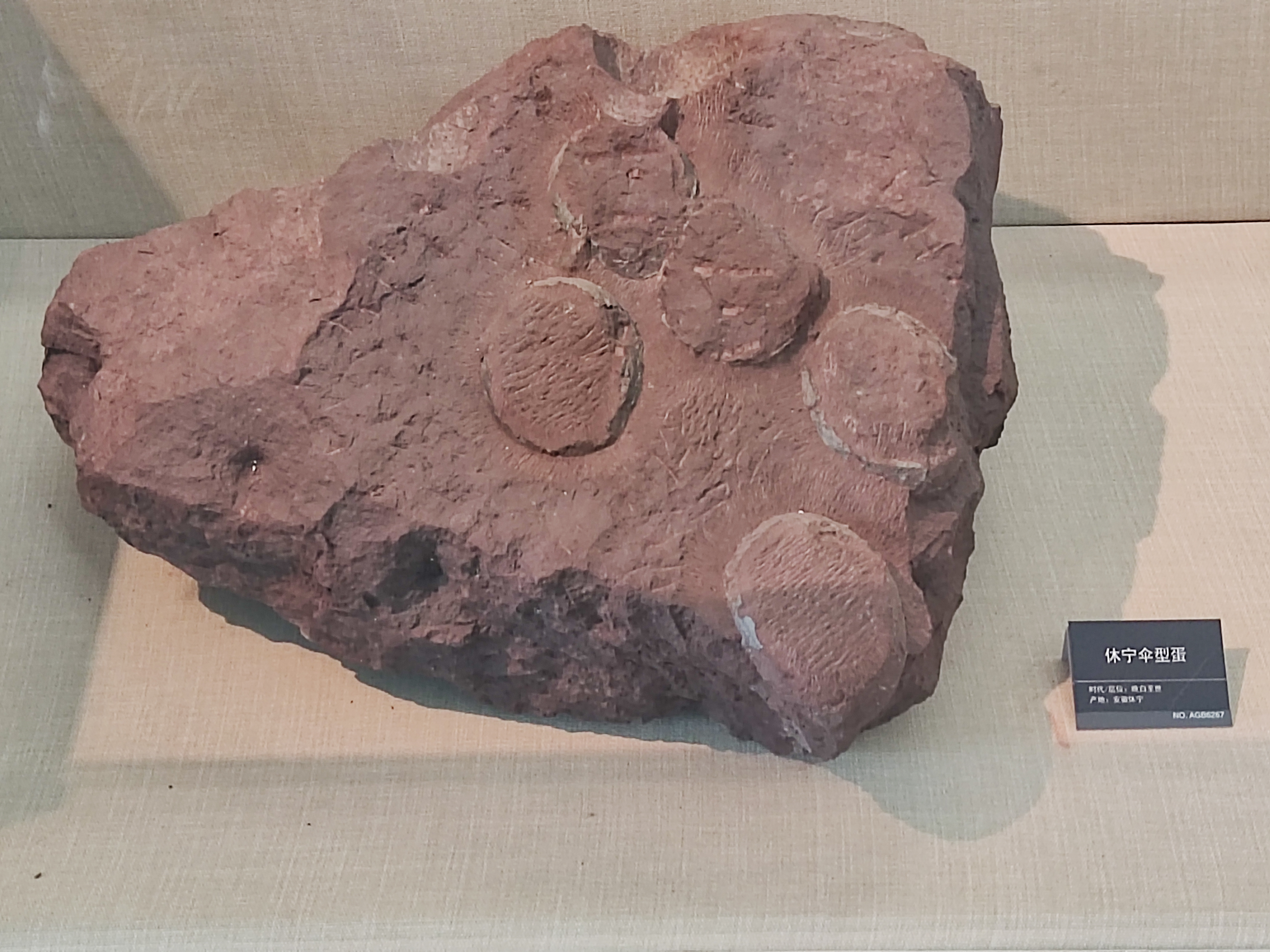
- Umbellaoolithus xiuningensis nest in the Anhui Geological Museum.

Egg fossil classification
- Basic shell type: †Dinosauroid-spherulitic
- Oofamily: †Umbellaoolithidae
- Oogenus: †Umbellaoolithus; Huang et al. 2017

Type oospecies
- †Umbellaoolithus xiuningensis Huang et al. 2017

= Umbellaoolithus =

Umbellaoolithus Temporal range: Cenomanian–Turonian

Fossil dinosaur eggs

Umbellaoolithus is an oogenus of dinosaur eggs found in the early Upper Cretaceous in Southern China.

== Description ==
The eggs are oval-shaped and measure on average 13.86 cm (5.46 in) long by 10.43 cm (4.11 in) wide. The eggshell is thin (average thickness: 0.75 mm (0.030 in)) and its outer surface is smooth. The shell units (the microscopic discrete crystal structures which make up all hard eggshells) have a distinctive microstructure. The cone layer is relatively thin, making up only one sixth of the eggshell, with the rest being the columnar layer. The shell units are irregularly shaped, with a mix of umbrella-shaped, triangular-shaped, and conical units. Sometimes two or three of these units are fused together. The pores are irregularly shaped and unevenly distributed within the eggshell.

The sole preserved clutch is incomplete, but contained at least nine eggs, placed with uneven spacing and depth in the ground, contrasting the regular circular nests characteristic of Elongatoolithidae. While incomplete, the arrangement of the eggs appears to have been unaltered in preservation, and the eggs were all laid with their long axes pointing in the same direction.

== Classification ==
Because parentage of fossil eggs is usually unknown, they are classified by their own parataxonomic system of oofamilies, oogenera, and oospecies. The oogenus Umbellaoolithus contains a single oospecies, Umbellaoolithus xiuningensis, which is the sole oospecies in the oofamily Umbellaoolithidae. Among other oofamilies, they show the most similarity to Similifaveoloolithidae.

== Discovery and naming ==
The eggs now classified as Umbellaoolithus were discovered by accident during a 2011 construction project in Xiuning County in Anhui Province of southern China. At that time, workers discovered two fossilized dinosaur nests, which were transferred to local governing authorities. One of these, now housed at the Anhui Geological Museum, was analyzed in detail by a team of Chinese paleontologists led by Huang Jiandong of the Anhui Geological Museum, who determined on the basis of its unique microstructural traits that they belonged to a previously unrecognized oofamily.

In 2017, Huang et al. gave this specimen the name Umbellaoolithus xiuningensis and erected a new oofamily, Umbellaoolithidae, for it. The name is derived from the Latin umbella meaning "umbrella" in reference to the distinctive umbrella-shaped shell units. The suffix -oolithus, Greek for "stone egg", is traditional for ootaxa. The specific epiphet "xiuningensis" refers to the location of discovery. The Chinese name of Umbellaoolithus xiuningensis is 休宁伞形蛋, which similarly translates to "Xiuning umbrella-shaped egg".

== Paleobiology ==
The identity of the parent of Umbellaoolithus is unknown. Isotope analysis of the carbon and oxygen preserved in the eggshell suggests that the parent fed on C3 plants, and inhabited a warm and dry environment. Sedimentary analysis shows that the nest was laid in a floodplain. Therefore, it is believed that these eggs were laid in the floodplain of a river in an arid or semi-arid environment. The nests seem to have been buried in the ground.

== Distribution ==
Umbellaoolithus is known from the uppermost portion of the Huizhou Formation in Anhui, China. It is found at the same site as Similifaveoloolithus qiyunshanensis, another type of dinosaur egg. This site is dated to the early Late Cretaceous (Cenomanian-Turonian). This formation is notable for discoveries not only of fossil eggs, but also fossil footprints (including Xiuningpus and Qiyunshanpus), and dinosaur skeletal remains (including the pachycephalosaur Wannanosaurus).
