= Pseudomegaloolithus =

Pseudomegaloolithus Temporal range: Maastrichtian

Egg fossil classification
- Basic shell type: †Dinosauroid-spherulitic
- Oofamily: †Megaloolithidae
- Oogenus: †Pseudomegaloolithus; Vianey-Liaud & Garcia, 2003

Oospecies
- P. atlasi

Pseudomegaloolithus is an oogenus of fossil Megaloolithid egg from Morocco. It is known from eggshell fragments which are distinguished from other Megaloolithid eggs because of its thin shells, fan-shaped eggshell units, and the structure of the nodes and ridges on the eggshell surface. Some egg fragments from India, France, and Peru (some of which had previously been classified as Megaloolithus pseudomamillare) may actually represent specimens of Pseudomegaloolithus.
