= Megaloolithidae =

Megaloolithidae Temporal range: 171.6–48.6 Ma

Egg fossil classification
- Basic shell type: †Dinosauroid-spherulitic
- Oofamily: †Megaloolithidae; Zhao, 1979

Oogenera
- Megaloolithus; Pseudomegaloolithus

Megaloolithidae is an oofamily of fossil egg of the Dinosauroid-spherulitic morphotype. They probably are the eggs of sauropods.

== Paleopathology ==
=== Multilayered shell ===
Megaloolithid eggs with multiple layers of eggshell have been preserved in the fossil record. Multilayered fossil eggs resemble those of modern forms in sometimes having incomplete extra layers and pore canals that don't properly align. The misalignment of the pore canals can prevent oxygen from getting to the embryo and cause it to suffocate. The term ovum in ovo has been used for multilayered dinosaur eggs although this is inaccurate use of the term. The greater abundance may indicate that these eggs were more prone to such pathologies, but are most likely due to a larger sample size of them. Megaloolithid eggs with a discretispherulitic morphotype account for the majority of dinosaur eggs preserved with this deformity.
