= Gekkoolithus =

Gekkoolithus Temporal range: Eocene-Miocene

Egg fossil classification
- Basic shell type: Geckoid
- Morphotype: Geckonoid
- Oofamily: †Gekkoolithidae
- Oogenus: †Gekkoolithus; Hirsch et al., 1996

Oospecies
- †G. columnaris Hirsch 1996 (type)

Gecko egg oogenus

Gekkoolithus is an oogenus of fossil gecko egg. Gecko eggs have not been well-studied, and their fossils are very rare, making classification of them difficult. Gekkolithus eggs are very similar to those of the modern Phelsuma delandis in size, shape, and structure.
