= Oblongoolithus =

Oblongoolithus Temporal range: Campanian ~80–70 Ma

Egg fossil classification
- Basic shell type: Ornithoid
- Morphotype: Ornithoid-ratite
- Oofamily: †Oblongoolithidae
- Oogenus: †Oblongoolithus; Mikhailov, 1996

Oospecies
- O. glaber

Dinosaur egg

Oblongoolithus is an oogenus of dinosaur eggs, from the Campanian Barun Goyot Formation of Mongolia. The oogenus contains one oospecies O. glaber, and is the sole described oospecies in the oofamily Oblongoolithidae.

These eggs are small and share many characteristics with elongatoolithids and laevisoolithids, which represent the eggs of theropods. Its outer surface is smooth, contrasting with the rough ornamentation of elongatoolithids. They are small and elongated in shape, with an estimated size of 10 by 4 centimetres (3.9 in × 1.6 in). The thickness of the eggshell ranges from 0.3 to 0.7 millimetres (0.012 to 0.028 in).

The fossils now assigned to Oblongoolithus consist of just six fragments of one egg. They were discovered in Ömnögovi Province of Mongolia by the Joint Soviet-Mongolian Expedition in the 90s.

== See also ==
- List of dinosaur oogenera
