= Folinsbee =

Folinsbee is a surname. Notable people with the surname include:

- John Fulton Folinsbee (1892–1972), American painter
- Robert Folinsbee (1917–2008), Canadian geologist

== Other ==
- 187679 Folinsbee, a minor planet orbiting between Mars and Jupiters orbits
