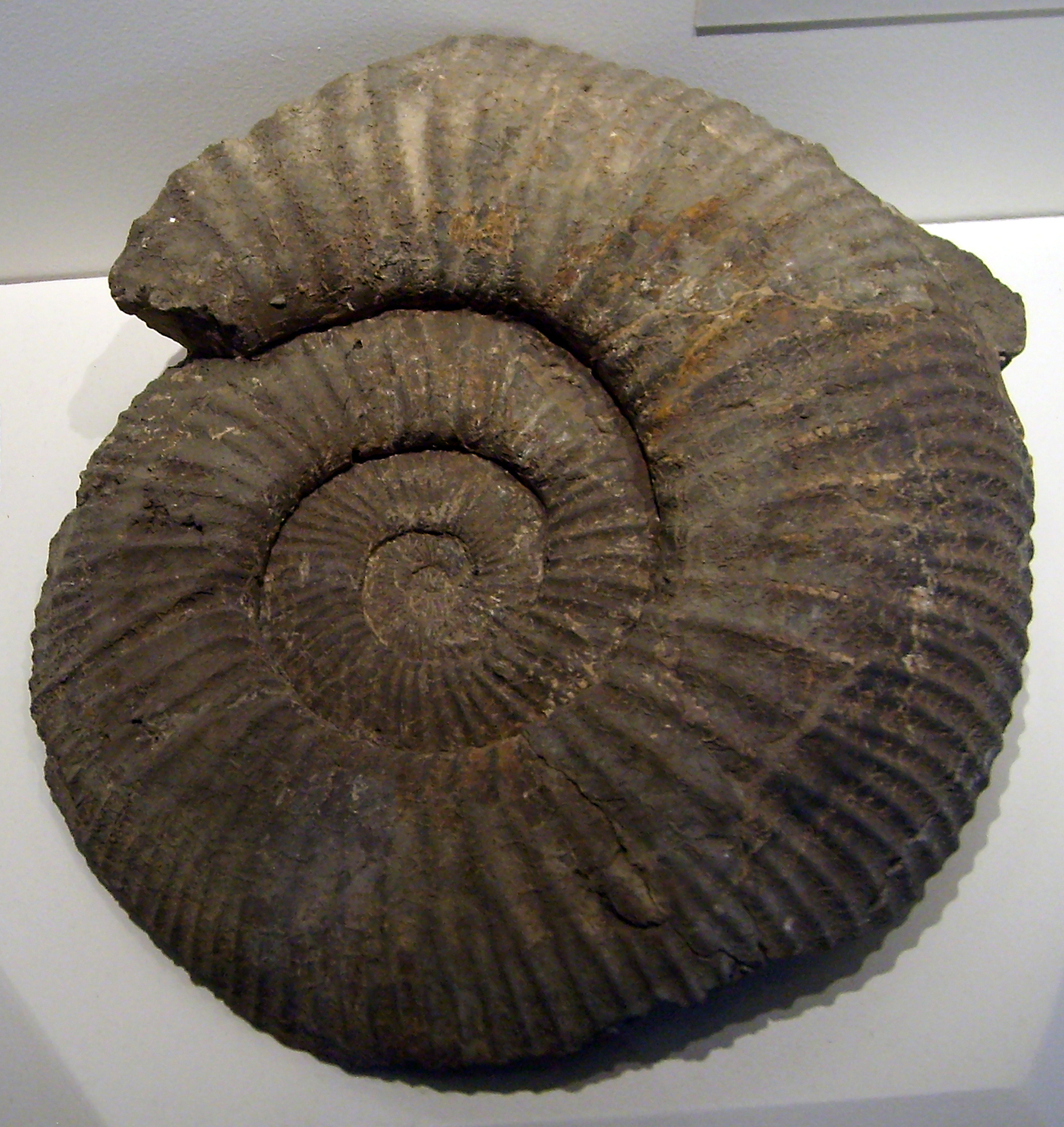
- P. groenlandicus in Geological Museum, Copenhagen

Scientific classification
- Kingdom: Animalia
- Phylum: Mollusca
- Class: Cephalopoda
- Subclass: †Ammonoidea
- Genus: †Pectinatites; Arkell (1947)

Species
- P. pectinatus (Phill.); P. paravirgatus; P. eastlecottensis; P. (Arkellites) hudlestoni; P. (Virgatosphincoides) encombensis; P. (Virgatosphinctoides) reisiformis; P. (Virgatosphinctoides) wheatleyensis; P. (Virgatoshinctoides) smedmorensis; P. (Virgatosphintoides) scitulus; P. (Virgatosphinctoides) elegans

= Pectinatites =

Pectinatites Temporal range: Tithonian, 149.3–149 Ma

Extinct genus of cephalopod

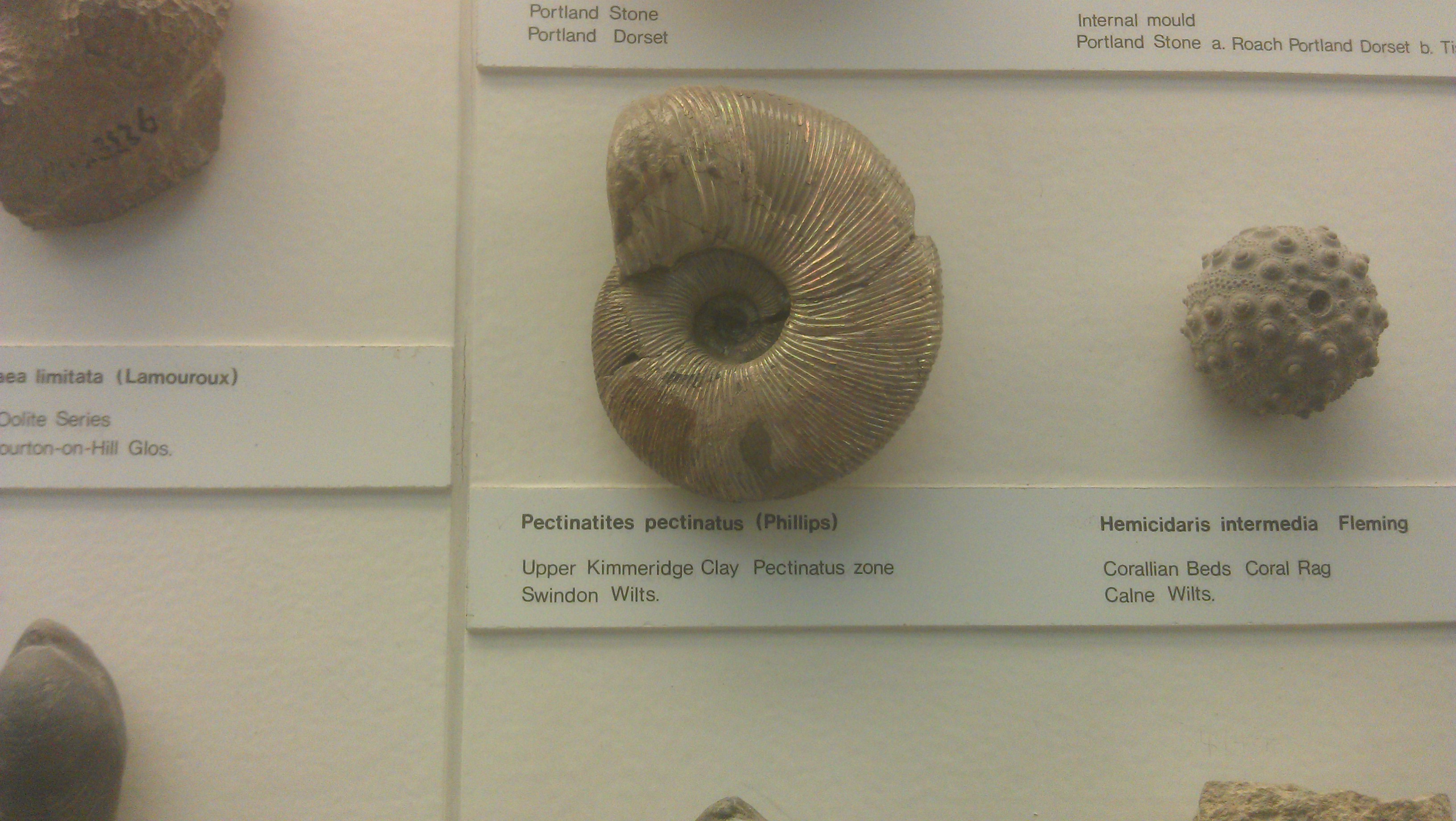
P. pectinatus from Kimmeridge Clay Formation, Swindon, Wiltshire, England at the Natural History Museum

Pectinatites is an extinct cephalopod genus belonging to the order Ammonoidea, that lived during the upper Tithonian stage of the Late Jurassic. They were fast-moving nektonic carnivores.

Clutches of eggs attributed to this genus have been discovered in the Kimmeridge Clay.
