= Testudoflexoolithus =

Testudoflexoolithus Temporal range: Upper Jurassic-Pleistocene

Egg fossil classification
- Basic shell type: †Testudoid
- Morphotype: †Spheruflexibilis
- Oofamily: †Testudoflexoolithidae
- Oogenus: †Testudoflexoolithus; Hirsch, 1996

Oospecies
- †T. bathonicae; †T. agassizi

Testudoflexoolithus is an oogenus of fossil turtle egg, containing two oospecies: T. bathonicae and T. agassizi.
