= Mazonova =

Mazonova Temporal range: Pennsylvanian

Egg fossil classification
- Oogenus: †Mazonova; Godfrey, 1995

Type oospecies
- †Mazonova helmichnus Godfrey, 1995

Mazonova is an oogenus of fossilized eggs from the Mazon Creek area in the Pennsylvanian of Illinois. They are laid in long strings of eggs enclosed in a gelatinous sheath containing one or two rows of eggs. It is unknown what kind of animal laid the eggs.

== Description ==
Mazonova is known from seven specimens. They are represented by fossilized impressions of long strands of eggs encased in a gelatinous sheath. In some specimens, the eggs are paired, whereas others have only a single row. The eggs are 1.5 to 1.7 mm in diameter, and the sheath is 3.0 to 3.8 mm in diameter.

== Classification ==
Paleozoic eggs are rare in the fossil record. Some coelacanth eggs (belonging to Rhabdoderma exiquum) are known, as well as the eggs of sharks, but Mazonova is quite distinct. They closely resemble the strands of eggs laid by some modern fish and amphibians, as well as opisthobranch mollusks. However, the eggs are far too large to be mollusk eggs, indicating they represent eggs of a vertebrate, though it is impossible to assign them to any order. There are several fish and amphibians from the Mazon Creek that could have spawned Mazonova.
