= Desmophyllites =

Desmophyllites Temporal range: Late Cretaceous

Scientific classification
- Kingdom: Animalia
- Phylum: Mollusca
- Class: Cephalopoda
- Subclass: †Ammonoidea
- Order: †Ammonitida
- Family: †Desmoceratidae
- Genus: †Desmophyllites; Spath, 1929

Desmophyllites is a small desmoceratitid ammonite characterized by a smooth and very involute shell that lived during the Santonian to Maachstrictian stages of the Late Cretaceous.

Shells of Desmophylites diphylloida from the upper Santonian are on order of 1.8 cm (0.7 in) in diameter. Those of Desmophylllites larteti from the upper Campanian are on order of 10.5 cm (~4 in) across.
