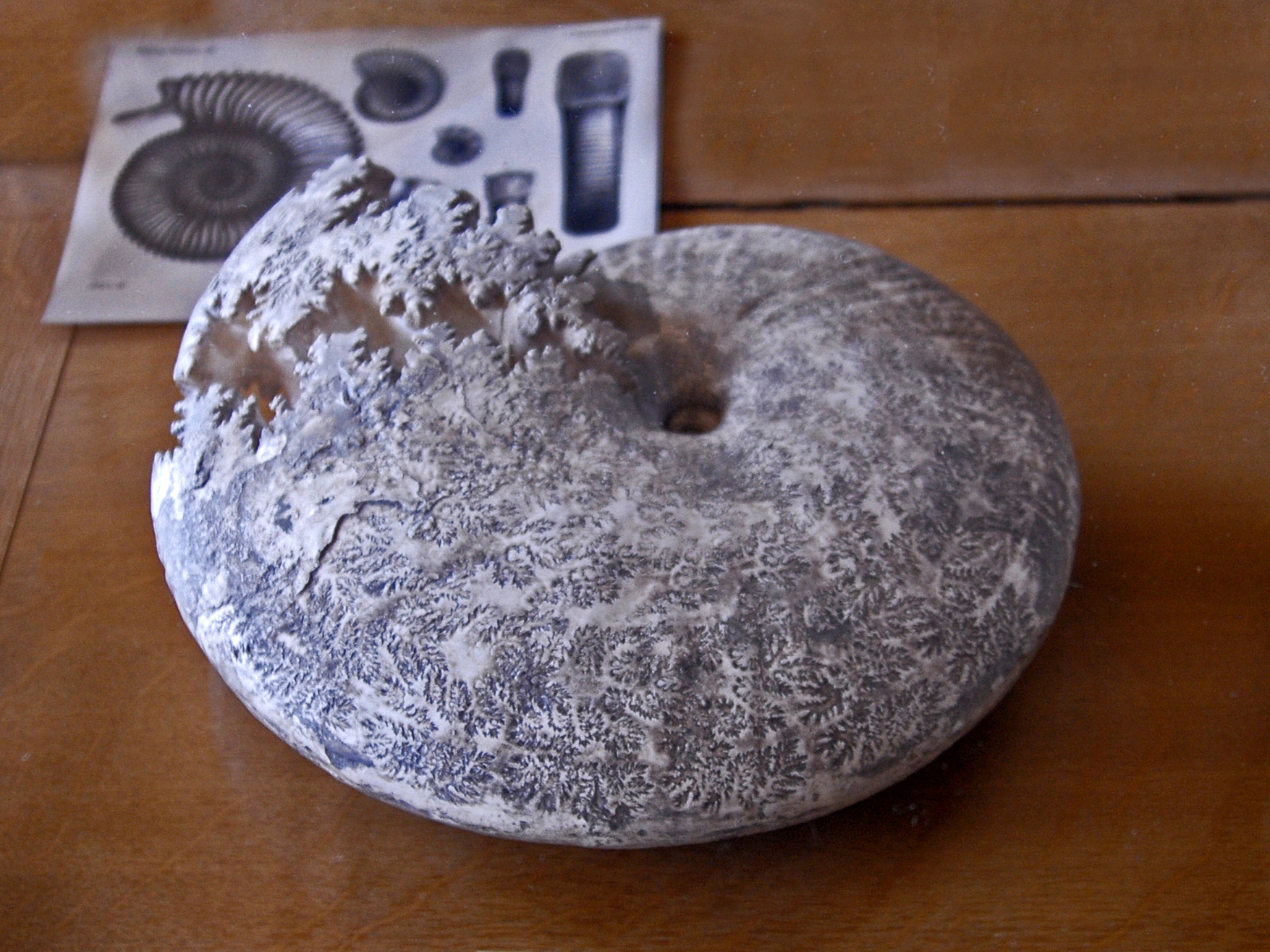
- Fossil shell of Aulacostephanus yo from France, on display at Galerie de paléontologie et d'anatomie comparée in Paris

Scientific classification
- Kingdom: Animalia
- Phylum: Mollusca
- Class: Cephalopoda
- Subclass: †Ammonoidea
- Order: †Ammonitida
- Family: †Aulacostephanidae
- Genus: †Aulacostephanus; Sutner & Pompeckj in Tornquist, 1896

= Aulacostephanus =

Aulacostephanus Temporal range: Tithonian

Genus of molluscs (fossil)

Aulacostephanus is an extinct ammonoid cephalopod genus from the Upper Jurassic Tithonian belonging to the perisphinctoidean family Aulacostephanidae.

Aulacostephanus produced a discoidal, strongly ribbed, evolute shell of moderate size, reaching diameters of 16 cm (~6.5in.), or so. Ribs diverge in pairs and threes from nodes on the umbilical shoulder and extend radially outward onto the ventro-lateral shoulder, but do not cross the venter, (the outer rim). Sides are flat, the venter steeply rounded, with an open bend or median groove running down the middle.

Clutches of eggs attributed to this genus have been discovered in the Kimmeridge Clay.

== Distribution ==
Jurassic sediments of Germany, the Russian Federation, Switzerland and the United Kingdom
