= Stalicoolithus =

Stalicoolithus Temporal range: Cenomanian-Santonian ~99–85 Ma

Egg fossil classification
- Basic shell type: †Dinosauroid-spherulitic
- Oofamily: †Stalicoolithidae
- Oogenus: †Stalicoolithus; Wang, Wang, Zhao & Jiang, 2012

Oospecies
- †Stalicoolithus shifengensis

Oogenus of dinosaur egg

Stalicoolithus is an oogenus of dinosaur egg from the Sanshui and Chichengshan Formations of the Tiantai Basin in Zhejiang Province. It is known from a single, complete fossil egg, notable for its spherical shape.

== See also ==
- List of dinosaur oogenera
