= Similifaveoloolithus =

Similifaveoloolithus Temporal range: Aptian ~125–113 Ma

Egg fossil classification
- Basic shell type: †Dinosauroid-spherulitic
- Oofamily: †Similifaveoloolithidae
- Oogenus: †Similifaveoloolithus; Wang et al., 2011

Oospecies
- †S. shuangtangensis Fang et al. 2003 (type); †S. gongzhulingensis Wang et al. 2006

Dinosaur egg

Similifaveoloolithus is an oogenus of fossil dinosaur egg from the Tiantai basin in Zhejiang Province, China. It is the sole known oospecies of the oofamily Similifaveoloolithidae.

== Description ==
Similifaveoloolithus gongzhulingensis is known from nine specimens, including five complete fossil eggs; S. shuangtangensis is known from two complete fossil eggs of the Aptian Quantou Formation. The eggs are spherical and the pores are very numerous and irregular, with a honeycomb-like appearance. They are 11–12 cm in diameter. The shell is composed of two or three superimposed layers of shell units. S. gongzhulingensis is distinguished from S. shuangtangensis by its thicker eggshell.

== Parataxonomy ==
Similifaveoloolithus is the only described oospecies of Similifaveoloolithidae. S. shuangtangensis was originally described as a species of Dendroolithus in 2003. However, Wang et al. (2011) considered it different enough from other ootaxa to be placed into a new oofamily and oogenus. S. gongzhulingensis was originally described as a species of Dictyoolithus, but it was reclassified as a species of Similifaveoloolithus by Wang et al. (2013), because it shares much more in common with S. shuangtangensis than with the Dictyoolithids.
