= Dendroolithus =

Dendroolithus Temporal range: Cenomanian-Maastrichtian ~99–66 Ma
- D. sanlimiaoensis, National Natural History Museum of China

Egg fossil classification
- Basic shell type: †Dinosauroid-spherulitic
- Oofamily: †Dendroolithidae
- Oogenus: †Dendroolithus; Zhao and Li, 1988

Type oospecies
- †Dendroolithus wangdianensis

Oospecies
- †Dendroolithus dendriticus; †Dendroolithus fengguangcunensis; †Dendroolithus guoqingsiensis; †Dendroolithus microporosus; †Dendroolithus verrucarius; †Dendroolithus wangdianensis; †Dendroolithus xichuanensis

Oogenus of dinosaur egg

Dendroolithus is an oogenus of Dendroolithid dinosaur egg found in the late Cenomanian Chichengshan Formation (Tiantai Group), in the Gong-An-Zhai and Santonian Majiacun Formations of China and the Maastrichtian Nemegt and Campanian Barun Goyot Formation of Mongolia. They can be up to 162 mm long and 130 mm wide. These eggs may have been laid by a Therizinosaur, Sauropod, or Ornithopod. The oospecies "D." shangtangensis was originally classified as Dendroolithus, however, it has since been moved to its own distinct oogenus, Similifaveoloolithus. This oogenus is related with embryos of the theropod Torvosaurus.
