= Trigonoolithus =

Trigonoolithus Temporal range: Lower Cretaceous

Egg fossil classification
- Basic shell type: †Dinosauroid-prismatic
- Oofamily: †Prismatoolithidae
- Oogenus: †Trigonoolithus; Moreno-Azanza et al., 2014

Oospecies
- Trigonoolithus amoae Moreno-Azanza et al. 2014

Trigonoolithus is an oogenus of dinosaur egg, representing a basal prismatoolithid. Its eggshell, like avian eggs, is composed of three structural layers, but cladistic analysis suggests that its parent was a non-avian theropod.

== History ==
Fossil eggshells now assigned to Trigonoolithus were first discovered in 2009 by Miguel Moreno-Azanza, José Manuel Gasca, and José Ignacio Canudo, three paleontologists from Universidad de Zaragoza. They recognized that the fossils represented a new oogenus of prismatoolithids, but the description would not be completed until 2014, when they published a description of the new oogenus and oospecies Trigonoolithus amoae in the paleontology journal Acta Palaeontologica Polonica.

== Distribution ==
Fossils of Trigonoolithus are found in abundance at the La Cantera site of the Blesa Formation in Teruel, Spain. This site is dated to the early Barremian age.

== Description ==
Trigonoolithus is known from numerous eggshell fragments, but no complete or near-complete eggs. The whole egg of T. amoae was probably highly elongated, similar to other prismatoolithids. The shell fragments vary between 330 and 1040 μm in thickness, including the prominent triangular protuberances ornamenting their outer surface.

Its eggshell is made up of three structural layers, with gradual boundaries between them. The middle layer, known as the prismatic layer, has a squamatic texture and the prismatic structure characteristic of Prismatoolithidae. It is three to four times thicker than the innermost layer (the mammillary layer), and two to three times thicker than the external layer.

Circular pores 10 μm in diameter cut through Trigonoolithus's shell to allow for gas exchange. They are angusticanaliculate (meaning the pores are long, straight, and narrow), similar to the pore systems of Prismatoolithus, Sankofa, and Protoceratopsidovum.

== Parataxonomy ==
Trigonoolithus is classified in the oofamily Prismatoolithidae, alongside Preprismatoolithus, Prismatoolithus, Protoceratopsidovum, Sankofa, and Spheruprismatoolithus.

Moreno-Azanza et al. performed multiple cladistic analyses to determine the phylogenetic position of Trigonoolithus. Because no complete Trigonoolithus eggs are known, its position was slightly unstable, but Trigonoolithus was consistently placed as the basalmost member of Prismatoolithidae, or in a polytomy with other non-avian theropods and birds.

== Paleobiology ==
Prismatoolithids were previously hypothesized to be eggs of hypsilophodonts or ceratopsians, but later research found that they in fact are the eggs of theropods, based on analysis of preserved embryos of Prismatoolithus levis which showed them to be Troodon formosus. Therefore, Trigonoolithus was also probably laid by a theropod. Based on its phylogenetic position, Moreno-Azanza et al. concluded it was most likely a non-dromaeosaurian, non-oviraptorid coelurosaur theropod dinosaur. Of the theropods found at La Cantalera (so far represented only by teeth), only aff. Paronychodon sp. and an indeterminate maniraptoran are possible parents of Trigonoolithus.
