= Continuoolithus =

Continuoolithus Temporal range: Late Santonian-Maastrichtian

Egg fossil classification
- Basic shell type: Ornithoid
- Morphotype: Ornithoid-ratite
- Oogenus: †Continuoolithus; Zelenitsky, Hills & Currie, 1996

Oospecies
- †C. canadensis Zelenitsky, Hills & Currie, 1996

Synonyms
- Spongioolithus hirschi Bray 1999

Dinosaur egg

Continuoolithus is an oogenus (fossil egg genus) of dinosaur egg found in the late Cretaceous of North America. It is most commonly known from the late Campanian of Alberta and Montana, but specimens have also been found dating to the older Santonian and the younger Maastrichtian. It was laid by an unknown type of theropod. These small eggs (measuring 77–123 mm (3.0–4.8 in) long) are similar to the eggs of oviraptorid dinosaurs (oofamily Elongatoolithidae), but have a distinctive type of ornamentation.

Continuoolithus nests would have been incubated under vegetation and sediment, unlike nests of Troodon and oviraptorids, which were incubated by brooding adults. Adaptations in the eggshell, such as high porosity and prominent ornamentation, would have helped the embryo breathe while buried. One fossil egg contains a tiny embryonic skeleton at an exceptionally young stage of development (perhaps eight to ten days old) showing the earliest stages of bone development.

== Description ==
Complete eggs range from 95 by 60 mm (3.7 by 2.4 in) to 123 by 77 mm (4.8 by 3.0 in) in size. They are elongated and ovoid shaped (i.e., with one blunt end and one pointed end). Known nesting traces contain from three to six eggs arranged parallel to each-other in linear rows. The outer surface of the egg is ornamented with coarse ornamentation, accounting for one fifth the total thickness of the shell. Unlike elongatoolithids, Continuoolithus's ornamentation pattern consists of randomly dispersed nodes (dispersituberculate ornamentation). The pores follow the angusticanaliculate type (i.e. narrow and straight pores). Continuoolithus had a remarkably high porosity and therefore a high rate of gas exchange, which is associated with incubation of eggs in covered nests.

Continuoolithus canadensis's eggshell was 0.94–1.28 mm (0.037–0.050 in) thick. Other specimens differ in shell thickness: some fragments referred to C. sp. have a slightly thinner shell, C. cf. canadensis fragments from Willow Creek have a thicker shell, and C. cf. canadensis from Milk River are thinner. Similar to most theropod eggs, its shell consists of two layers of calcite crystals. The inner layer, called the mammillary layer, is made of tightly packed cones called mammillae. Overlying this layer is the continuous layer, which is four to eight times thicker than the mammillary layer. In elongatoolithids and in Continuoolithus, this layer is distinctive because it is not subdivided into well-defined crystal units (hence the name continuous layer). While some division into prisms can be observed near the outer surface of the shell, this is mostly obscured by scale-like squamatic ultrastructure.

Two specimens of Continuoolithus preserve the shell membrane, a layer of fibrous proteins found in extant archosaur (bird and crocodylian) eggs beneath the hard crystalline shell. The original protein is not preserved, but the specimens do show networks of tubular fibers anchoring the mammillae.

== Paleobiology and parenting ==
Continuoolithus was most likely laid by a non-avian theropod dinosaur. Its microstructure is very similar to that of theropods; it differs from avian eggs in its relative size, its lack of a third eggshell layer, and its prominent ornamentation. Like many other types of non-avian theropod eggs, Continuoolithus eggs are typically found paired; this is because the parent dinosaurs had two functional oviducts, each of which would produce an egg simultaneously.

Comparing the Maastrictian-aged specimens to the older Campanian specimens of Continuoolithus and other types of theropod eggshells shows a trend of increasing eggshell thickness, which may be correlated with some theropod taxa increasing in body size in the late Cretaceous.

=== Nesting and incubation ===
The known nests of Continuoolithus eggs consist of three to six eggs arranged parallel to each other in a linear row. Multiple lines of evidence show that mother of the eggs would, after excavating the nest and laying a clutch of eggs, bury them in a thin layer of mud and vegetation. One nest is preserved with a carbonaceous covering, representing sediment or vegetation that covered the nest. Also, the eggs have a remarkably high rate of gas conductance, which correlates strongly with burial of nests because eggs covered in sediment cannot as readily exchange air and water with their environment as those left exposed. Also, the prominent nodes on the surface of the eggshell may have functioned to prevent debris from clogging the pores when the egg was buried. Thus, unlike Troodon eggs and elongatoolithids (the eggs of oviraptorosaurs), Continuoolithus would have been incubated in substrate rather than by a brooding adult. The heat from the decaying vegetation may have aided the incubation.

=== Embryo ===
One Continuoolithus egg contains embryonic remains representing a relatively early stage of development so that the skeleton was almost entirely cartilaginous, which has been largely replaced in the fossil by an amorphous calcite mass. Two long skeletal elements are recognizable, however. Both of them appear to be in the very earliest stages of bone formation (ossification). The shorter of the two (measuring 9 mm (0.35 in) long) is thought to be a femur because of its shape. The longer element (15.5 mm (0.61 in) long) is not developed enough to identify, but may be a tibia. The taxonomic identity of the embryo is impossible to determine, but based on comparisons to Troodon, Orodromeus, and Maiasaura, it is estimated to have been 60–70 mm (2.4–2.8 in) long. It clearly represents a very early stage of development (in fact, it is the youngest vertebrate skeleton ever discovered), both because of the lack of ossification and because of its tiny size relative to the egg; based on comparisons to the developmental patterns of modern birds, Horner (1997) estimated it may have died eight to ten days after fertilization.

== Classification ==
Only one oospecies of Continuoolithus has been named: C. canadensis. The microstructure of its eggshell closely resembles that of elongatoolithids, so it was classified in Elongatoolithidae by Wang et al. (2010). However, most authors do not include it in Elongatoolithidae, considering it to be of uncertain placement because it has different ornamentation and also shows similarity to Prismatoolithidae. Carpenter (1999) suggested that Continuoolithus is different enough to warrant its own oofamily. It belongs to the ornithoid-ratite morphotype, a grouping which primarily includes paleognathous birds and non-avian theropods.

Continuoolithus canadensis has one junior synonym, Spongioolithus hirschi, which was originally classified as a distinct oogenus and oospecies of Elongatoolithidae.

== History ==
Eggs have been known from the Two Medicine Formation in Montana since 1979. In 1990, Continuoolithus specimens, found at the Egg Mountain locality, were first described in detail by paleontologists Karl Hirsch and Betty Quinn, but they did not give them a parataxonomic name. At that time, prominent American paleontologist Jack Horner believed them to be eggs of Troodon based on the appearance of the embryonic remains. However, after further analysis of the embryo, Horner concluded that it could not be taxonomically identified. The eggs were conclusively shown not to be Troodon when the structurally quite distinct Prismatoolithus (previously thought to be eggs of Orodromeus) were shown to be Troodon by more thorough study of the preserved embryo.

In 1996, Canadian paleontologists Darla Zelenitsky, L.V. Hills and Phillip Currie named Continuoolithus based on newly discovered remains in Alberta. They noted similarity between the new specimens and the ?Troodon eggs of Two Medicine, but the Two Medicine eggs would not be formally assigned to Continuoolithus until Zelenitsky and Sloboda (2005), at which time they also reported the first occurrence of Continuoolithus in the Dinosaur Park Formation.

A nesting trace of Continuoolithus was excavated in 1994 at the Flaming Cliffs locality in Two Medicine. It was not prepared and described until 2012, when Rebecca Joy Schaff analyzed this nest and other Continuoolithus specimens extensively in her masters thesis at Montana State University. In 2015, she, and her advisor Frankie Jackson, along with David Varricchio and James Schmitt published these results in the journal PALAIOS.

In 2008, Ed Welsh and Julia Sankey published the first report of fossil dinosaur eggs from Texas, discovered in the Aguja Formation. They described several eggshell fragments, including some that were comparable to Continuoolithus, but perhaps more similar to the elongatoolithid Macroelongatoolithus in their ornamentation. In 2011, Kohei Tanaka et al. described numerous eggshell fragments from the Fruitland Formation in New Mexico, including a few fragments referable to Continuoolithus sp.

In 2017, a team of Canadian paleontologists led by Darla Zelenitsky reported the discovery of a pair of Continuoolithus shell fragments at the Willow Creek Formation in Alberta, representing the first fossils of the oogenus found in the Maastrichtian. The same year, Zelenitsky et al. also discovered the first Continuoolithus specimens in the Santonian, found at the Milk River Formation, also in Alberta. In 2025, Hedge et al. reported on new discoveries of Continuoolithu at the Mussentuchit Member of the Cedar Mountain Formation, and argued that Continuoolithus should again be classified as an elongatoolithid.

The oogenus and oospecies Spongioolithus hirschi was first named in 1999 by Emily Bray, based on numerous eggshell fragments discovered at the North Horn Formation. She classified it as a distinct type within Elongatoolithidae. However, this oospecies is indistinguishable from C. canadensis, so in 2018, Jared Voris, Zelenitsky, Therrien, and Tanaka synonymized the oospecies.

== Distribution and paleoecology ==
Continuoolithus canadensis is known from the Flaming Cliffs and the Egg Mountain localities (and possibly Sevenmile Hill too) of the Two Medicine Formation in Montana, from the Cedar Mountain Formation in Utah, from Devil's Coulee in the Oldman Formation in Alberta, and from the Dinosaur Park Formation in Alberta, all of which date to the Late Cretaceous (Campanian).

The Two Medicine Formation represents the coastal plains along the western side of the Western Interior Seaway. The Flaming Cliff locality formed in a well-drained overbank of an alluvial floodplain. The Egg Mountain locality also represents a floodplain overbank. The formation has a diverse assemblage of dinosaurs including theropods such as Troodon, Albertosaurus, ornithomimids and dromaeosaurs, as well as several types of hadrosaurs, ceratopsians, ankylosaurs, and smaller ornithischians such as Orodromeus. It also includes pterodactyloid pterosaurs, Champsosaurus, turtles, lizards, and mammals. Other types of eggs from Two Medicine include Montanoolithus, Prismatoolithus levis (the eggs of Troodon formosus), some small unidentified theropod eggs, P. hirschi, Triprismatoolithus, Tubercuoolithus, Spheroolithus albertensis (eggs of Maiasaura), S. choteauensis, eggs of Hypacrosaurus, and Krokolithes.

The Oldman Formation was formed by ephemeral rivers in a semi-arid environment characterized by seasonal precipitation. Like the Two Medicine Formation, the Oldman Formation is also known for its diversity of fossil eggs; in addition to Continuoolithus, eggs of Hypacrosaurus, Spheroolithus, Prismatoolithus, Porituberoolithus, Tristaguloolithus, and Dispersituberoolithus are also known. Dinosaurian skeletal remains include Troodon, tyrannosaurids, ankylosaurids, hadrosaurids, ceratopsids, and ornithomimids. Footprints of hadrosaurs are also known. The formation was also populated by multituberculate mammals, numerous types of turtles, Champsosaurus, sturgeons, and pterosaurs (including the giant Quetzalcoatlus).

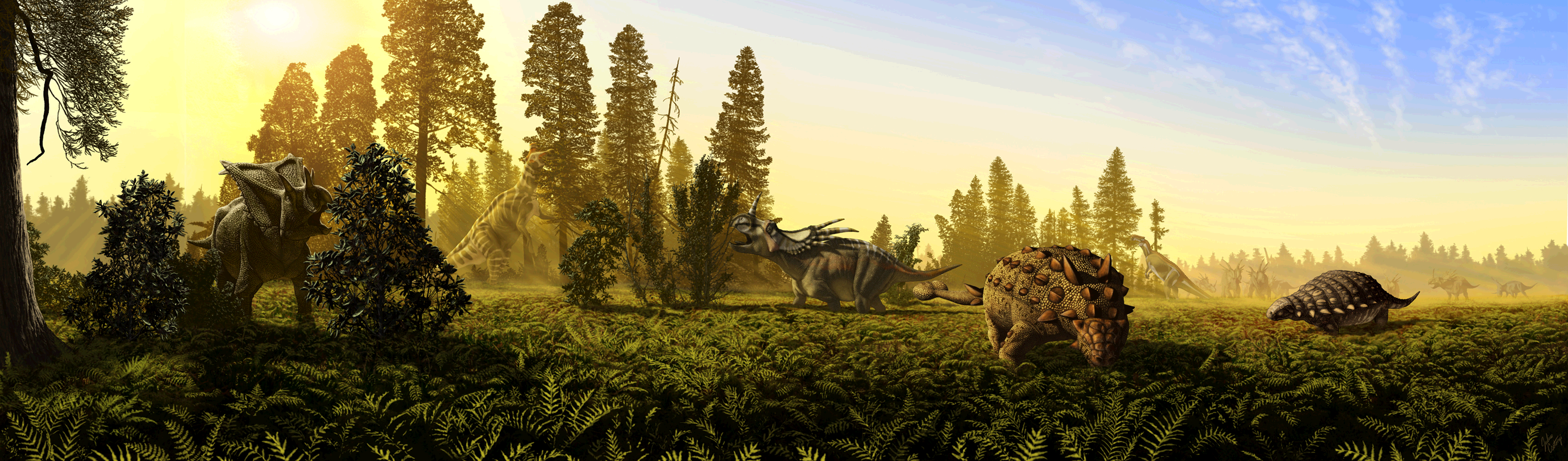
Artist's restoration of some megafaunal dinosaurs of the Dinosaur Park Formation.

The Dinosaur Park Formation is time-equivalent to the Oldman Formation, and both formations are part of the Belly River Group. It represents the deposits of a perennial, sinuous river system and paralic environments. It is widely known for its incredible diversity of dinosaurian fauna, representing over 50 valid taxa including theropods such as dromaeosaurs, caenagnathids, troodontids, ornithomimids, and tyrannosaurids, as well as ornithischians such as pachycephalosaurs, hadrosaurs, ceratopsians, ankylosaurs, and thescelosaurs. Other types of fossil eggs from the formation include Reticuoolithus, Porituberoolithus, Prismatoolithus, Spheroolithus, and Krokolithes.

Other Continuoolithus specimens, not classified into an oospecies, are known from the late Campanian of the Fruitland Formation (representing a well-drained river delta plain) in New Mexico, along with Porituberoolithus, Prismatoolithus, indeterminate theropod eggshells, Testudoolithus, and krokolithids. Also, fragments of C. cf. canadensis are known from the late Maastrichtian Willow Creek Formation in Alberta. This formation has relatively low dinosaurian diversity; eggs from the formation predominately belong to the ornithopod oogenus Spheroolithus, but some types of theropod eggs (Continuoolithus, Montanoolithus, Porituberoolithus, and Prismatoolithus) are known. C. cf. canadensis fragments were also found in the late Santonian Milk River Formation, wlong with Porituberoolithus, Prismatoolithus, Spheroolithus, and Triprismatoolithus. Maastrictian-aged Continuoolithus specimens have also been discovered in the North Horn Formation in Utah, a formation rich in dinosaur eggs, including Spheruprismatoolithus, Prismatoolithus, Ovaloolithus, and Spheroolithus.

== See also ==
- Dinosaur reproduction
- List of dinosaur oogenera
- Timeline of egg fossil research
