= Nanhsiungoolithus =

Nanhsiungoolithus Temporal range: Late Cretaceous ~89.8–66 Ma

Egg fossil classification
- Basic shell type: Ornithoid
- Morphotype: Ornithoid-ratite
- Oofamily: †Elongatoolithidae
- Oogenus: †Nanhsiungoolithus; Zhao, 1975

Oospecies
- N. chuetienensis Zhao, 1975

Fossil dinosaur eggs

Nanhsiungoolithus is an oogenus (fossil-egg genus) of dinosaur egg from the late Cretaceous of China. It belongs to the oofamily Elongatoolithidae, which means that it was probably laid by an oviraptorosaur, though so far no skeletal remains have been discovered in association with Nanhsiungoolithus. The oogenus contains only a single described oospecies, N. chuetienensis. It is fairly rare, only being known from two partially preserved nests and a few eggshell fragments.

== Description ==
The type specimen of Nanhsiungoolithus is a partial nest containing three mostly complete eggs and impressions. Another partial nest preserves two whole eggs, two incomplete eggs, and two impressions. Like other elongatoolithids, the eggs are found arranged in a circular pattern. The eggs are long and narrow, with an average length of 139.4 mm (5.49 in) and width of 68.4 mm (2.69 in). They are slightly asymmetrical, with one end slightly pointier than the other. Nanhsiungoolithus is distinctive for the smooth texture of its shell, contrasting the rough texture of other types of elongatoolithids.

The eggshell of Nanhsiungoolithus is on average just under 1 mm (0.039 in) thick. Like other members of its oofamily, its shell is divided into two structural layers: The inner layer, known as the mammillary layer, is composed of cone-shaped mammilla which are the bases of the crystalline units making up the eggshell. The outer layer is often called the continuous layer, because in most elongatoolithids the shell units in this layer are fused together. However, in Nanhsiungoolithus, the units are not fully fused and can still be seen as distinct columns.

Since the embryo must breathe, eggshells such as Nanhsiungoolithus have pores to allow for gas exchange. In Nanhsiungoolithus, the pores are sparsely spaced on most of the eggshell, but are much denser on the blunt end. The pores have more irregular-shaped openings than many related types of eggs.

== Parenting behavior ==
While no fossils of Nanhsiungoolithus have been found associated with a parent, multiple fossils confirm that elongatoolithid eggs were laid by oviraptorosaurian dinosaurs, who sat on their nests to incubate the eggs. Unlike some other dinosaurs, oviraptorosaurian parents did not bury their eggs.

== Classification ==
Fossilized eggs are classified by a parataxonomic system similar to Linnaean taxonomy. According to this system, Nanhsiungoolithus is an oogenus in the oofamily Elongatoolithidae. Along with Macroolithus and Elongatoolithus, it was the first oogenus ever given a formal parataxonomic name; it is a monotypic oogenus, with the single oospecies N. chuetienensis.

== History ==
Nanhsiungoolithus eggs were first discovered in Southern China by the pioneering Chinese paleontologist Yang Zhongjian. In 1965, he described several types of eggs from Nanxiong (Nanhsiung) in Guangdong, including two partial nests that would later be classified in Nanhsiungoolithus. He described them as members of the type "Oolithes" elongatus. In 1975, Chinese paleontologist Zhao Zikui created an early version of the modern parataxonomic system, with a hierarchical system of oofamilies, oogenera, and oospecies. Most of the specimens Yang classified as O. elongatus were classified as Elongatoolithus, but two of the partial nests were considered different enough to be placed in their own oogenus, Nanhsiungoolithus. Zhao chose the oogenus name to honor Nanxiong county, with the specific epithet chuetienensis meaning "from Chuetien", after the town nearest where the fossils were discovered. Nanhsiungoolithus eggs were first discovered outside of Guangdong only two years later, when China's Twelfth Geological Brigade discovered many new fossil egg sites in the Xichuan Basin in the Southwest of Henan. These eggs were not classified until 1998, when Zhao and his colleague Zhao Hong identified the fossils, identifying 8 eggshell fragments from the Majiacun Formation as Nanhsiungoolithus chuetienensis.

== Distribution and paleoecology ==
Nanhsiungoolithus is fairly rare, and has only been found in Guangdong and Henan, China. The fossils in Guangdong are found in the Nanxiong Basin, which is ancient river basin famously rich in fossil eggs. Here Nanhsiungoolithus eggshells are found in the very latest Cretaceous, alongside Macroolithus, Elongatoolithus, Apheloolithus, Prismatoolithus, Stromatoolithus, Ovaloolithus, and Shixingoolithus. The fossils in Henan are found at the Majiacun Formation, which is slightly older, dating from the Coniacian to the Santonian, and represents the depositions of a meandering stream system.

== See also ==
- List of dinosaur oogenera
- Dinosaur reproduction
