= Triprismatoolithus =

Triprismatoolithus Temporal range: Campanian

Egg fossil classification
- Basic shell type: †Dinosauroid-prismatic
- Oofamily: †Arriagadoolithidae
- Oogenus: †Triprismatoolithus; Jackson and Varricchio, 2010

Oospecies
- †T. stephensi Jackson and Varricchio, 2010 (type)

Dinosaur egg

Triprismatoolithus is an oogenus of dinosaur egg native to Teton County, Montana. It is classified in the oofamily Arriagadoolithidae, the eggs of alvarezsaurs.

== Distribution ==
Triprismatoolithus is known exclusively from Sevenmile Hill, a fossil site at the Two Medicine Formation in Teton County, Montana. It is the oldest known fossil egg site at that formation, dating to 80 million years ago, the early part of the Campanian.

== History ==
Fossil eggs are common from the upper part of the Two Medicine formation, but it was not until 2010 that paleontologists discovered eggs in the lower part, including Triprismatoolithus. They were discovered by two paleontologists from the University of Montana: Frankie D. Jackson and David J. Varricchio. It remained of uncertain classification (because no similar eggs were known) until 2012 when Agnolin et al. discovered similar eggs associated with Bonapartenykus, which they classified with Triprismatoolithus in a new oofamily, Arriagadoolithidae.

== Description ==
The type specimen of Triprismatoolithus is a complete egg measuring 30 mm by 75 mm, but several other incomplete eggs and eggshell fragments are known. The eggs were paired, similar to Continuoolithus. The eggshell is between ranges from 525 to 850 μm thick.

Triprismatoolithus is notable for having three structural layers, similar to birds and unlike most other non-avian dinosaur eggs. The second layer, known as the prismatic layer, is made up of closely packed calcite crystals, and exhibits irregular squamatic texture. It is five times thicker than the mammillary layer.

The surface of the eggshell of Triprismatoolithus is covered with low, rounded tubercles, similar to Arriagadoolithus.

== Classification ==
Triprismatoolithus shares many unique characteristics with Arriagadoolithus, so they are classified together in the oofamily Arriagadoolithidae. Triprismatoolithus contains a single oospecies: T. stephensi.

== Paleobiology ==
Triprismatoolithus has not been found associated with embryos or adult remains, so it is unknown precisely what kind of dinosaur laid the eggs. However, the closely related oogenus, Arriagadoolithus, was discovered closely associated with the alvarezsaurid Bonapartenykus, so it is likely that T. stephensi was also laid by an unknown alvarezaur or a closely related dinosaur.

Arriagadoolithids, like elongatoolithids, prismatoolithids, and Continuoolithus, are laid in pairs, which is interpreted as evidence that oviraptorosaurs, troodontids, and alvarezsaurs had two functioning oviducts, unlike birds which have only one.
