= Willow Creek Formation =

Geological formation in Alberta, Canada

- Stratigraphic range: Late Cretaceous–Paleocene
- Type: Geological formation
- Underlies: Porcupine Hills Formation
- Overlies: St. Mary River Formation

Lithology
- Primary: Shale, sandstone

Location
- Coordinates: 49.77208°N 113.36920°W
- Approximate paleocoordinates: 57.6°N 87.1°W
- Region: Alberta, Montana
- Country: Canada, United States
- Extent: Western Canada Sedimentary Basin

Type section
- Named for: Willow Creek
- Named by: G.M. Dawson
- Year defined: 1883
- Willow Creek Formation (Canada) Willow Creek Formation (Alberta)

The Willow Creek Formation is a stratigraphic unit of Late Cretaceous to Early Paleocene age in the Western Canada Sedimentary Basin of southwestern Alberta. It was first described by George Mercer Dawson in 1883 along the Willow Creek, a tributary of the Oldman River. Williams and Dyer defined the type section in 1930 at the mouth of Willow Creek, east of Fort Macleod.

The formation straddles the Cretaceous-Paleogene (K-Pg) boundary, which divides it into an upper, Early Paleocene member and a lower, Late Cretaceous member. Dinosaur remains are among the fossils that have been recovered from the Late Cretaceous portion.

== Lithology ==
The Willow Creek Formation is composed of non-marine varicolored shales, red beds and sandstones. The shales and red beds include calcite nodules and caliche deposits. The sandstones are soft, light grey, massively bedded and cross-bedded, with harder conglomeratic sandstones toward the base of the formation.

== Depositional environment ==
The sediments were eroded from the Canadian Cordillera, and were transported eastward by river systems and deposited in fluvial channel and floodplain environments. The caliche and red beds reflect deposition under arid to semi-arid climate conditions. This contrasts with the equivalent Scollard Formation north of the Bow River, which includes coal deposits indicative of a more humid environment.

== Distribution ==
The Willow Creek Formation is present in southwestern Alberta, south of the Bow River, and extends a short distance into northern Montana. It thins eastward from the foothills of the Canadian Rockies to its limit east of Vulcan, Alberta. Thicknesses exceeding 1000 meters have been reported.

== Relationship to other units ==
The Willow Creek Formation is overlain by the Porcupine Hills Formation, and underlain by the St. Mary River Formation. It grades into the equivalent Scollard Formation south of the Bow River at about 50° 30'N latitude, and into the Coalspur Formation in the southern foothills. The lower, Late Cretaceous member is correlated with the Frenchman Formation of Saskatchewan, and the upper, Early Paleocene member is correlated with the lower portion of the Ravenscrag Formation.

== Vertebrate paleofauna ==
- Tyrannosaurus rex
- Hadrosauridae indet.
- Leptoceatopsidae indet.
- Ornithopodia indet., most likely Thescelosauridae
- Dromaeosauridae indet.
- Oviraptorosauria indet.
- Troodontidae indet.

=== Ootaxa ===
Numerous eggshell fragments are known from the formation; over 85% of them belong to the ornithopod oogenus Spheroolithus.

- Spheroolithus cf. albertensis
- S. cf. choteauensis
- Continuoolithus cf. canadensis
- Montanoolithus cf. strongorum
- Porituberoolithus warnerensis
- Prismatoolithus cf. levis
- Prismatoolithus sp.

== See also ==
- List of dinosaur-bearing rock formations
