= Dinosaur egg =

Vessel for dinosaur embryo development

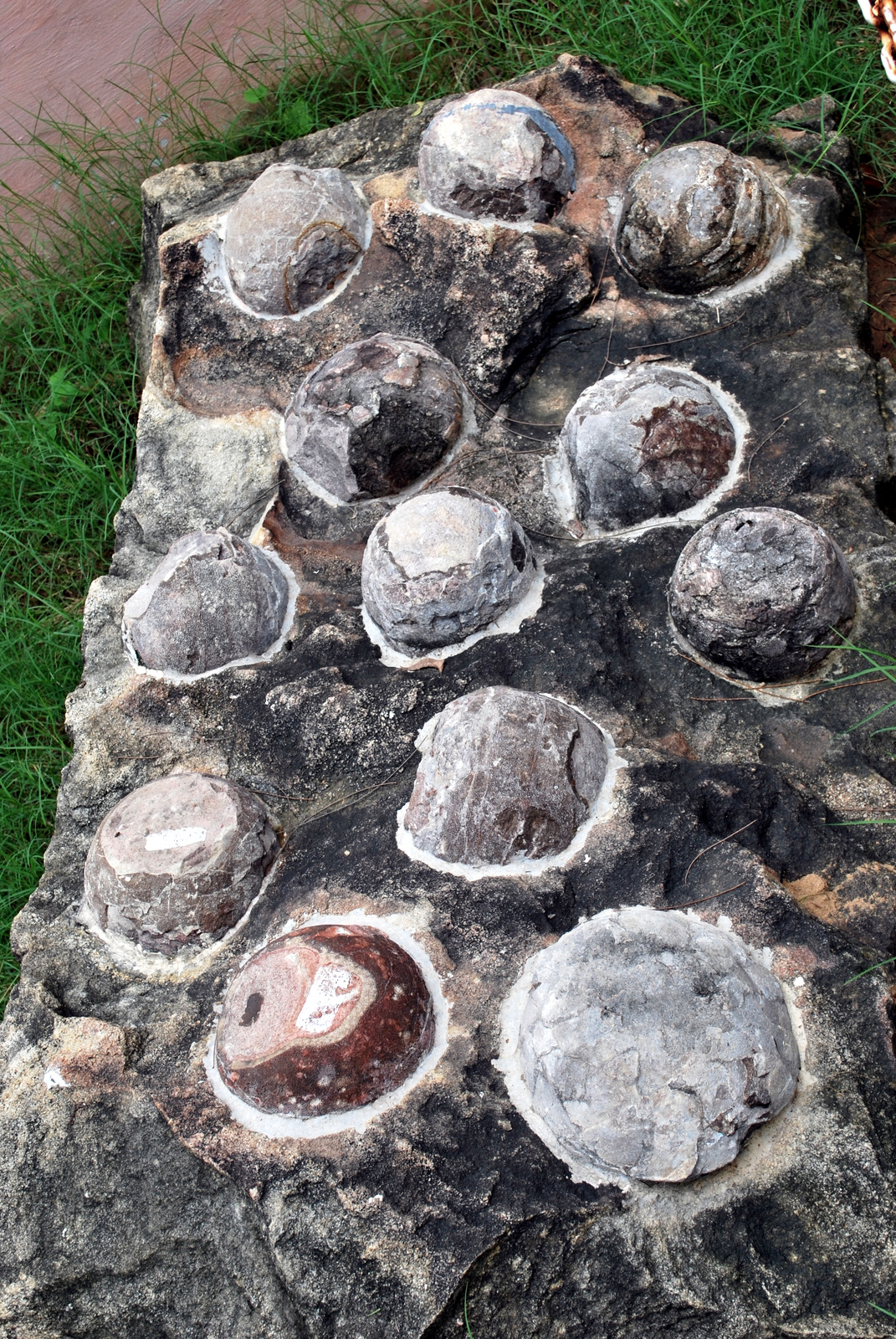
Fossilized sauropod eggs displayed at Indroda Dinosaur and Fossil Park

Dinosaur eggs are the organic vessels in which a dinosaur embryo develops. When the first scientifically documented remains of non-avian dinosaurs were being described in England during the 1820s, it was presumed that dinosaurs had laid eggs because they were reptiles. In 1859, the first scientifically documented dinosaur egg fossils were discovered in France by Jean-Jacques Pouech, although they were mistaken for giant bird eggs (birds were not yet recognized as dinosaurs at the time).

The first scientifically recognized non-avian dinosaur egg fossils were discovered in 1923 by an American Museum of Natural History crew in Mongolia. Dinosaur eggshell can be studied in thin section and viewed under a microscope. The interior of a dinosaur egg can be studied using CAT scans or by gradually dissolving away the shell with acid. Sometimes the egg preserves the remains of the developing embryo inside. The oldest known dinosaur eggs and embryos are from Massospondylus, which lived during the Early Jurassic, about 190 million years ago.

== History ==
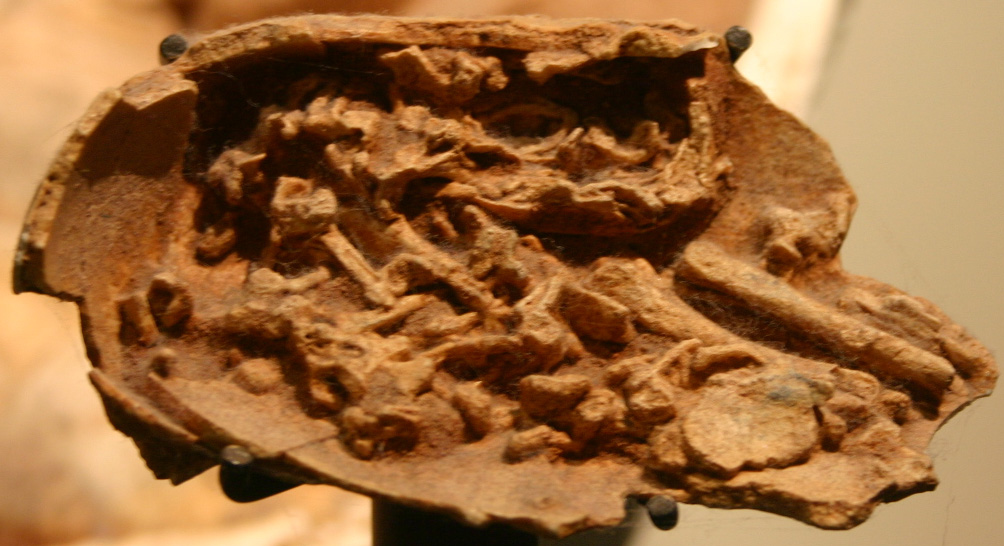
A Citipati osmolskae egg with preserved embryo, at the AMNH.

In 1859, the first scientifically documented dinosaur egg fossils were discovered in southern France by a Catholic priest and amateur naturalist named Father Jean-Jacques Pouech; he thought, however, that they were laid by giant birds. The first scientifically recognized dinosaur egg fossils were discovered serendipitously in 1923 by an American Museum of Natural History crew while looking for evidence of early humans in Mongolia. These eggs were mistakenly attributed to the locally abundant herbivore Protoceratops, but are now known to be Oviraptor eggs. Egg discoveries continued to mount all over the world, leading to the development of multiple competing classification schemes.

== Identification ==
Fossil dinosaur eggshell fragments can be recognized based on three important traits. Their thickness should be roughly uniform, they are usually slightly curved, and their surface is covered in tiny pores. Less frequently, the concave underside of the eggshell fragment will preserve bumps known as mammillae. Sometimes the embryo had absorbed so much of the calcium that the mammillae need a magnifying glass or microscope to be seen. However, there are many kinds of naturally occurring objects which can resemble fossil eggs. These can fool even professional paleontologists.

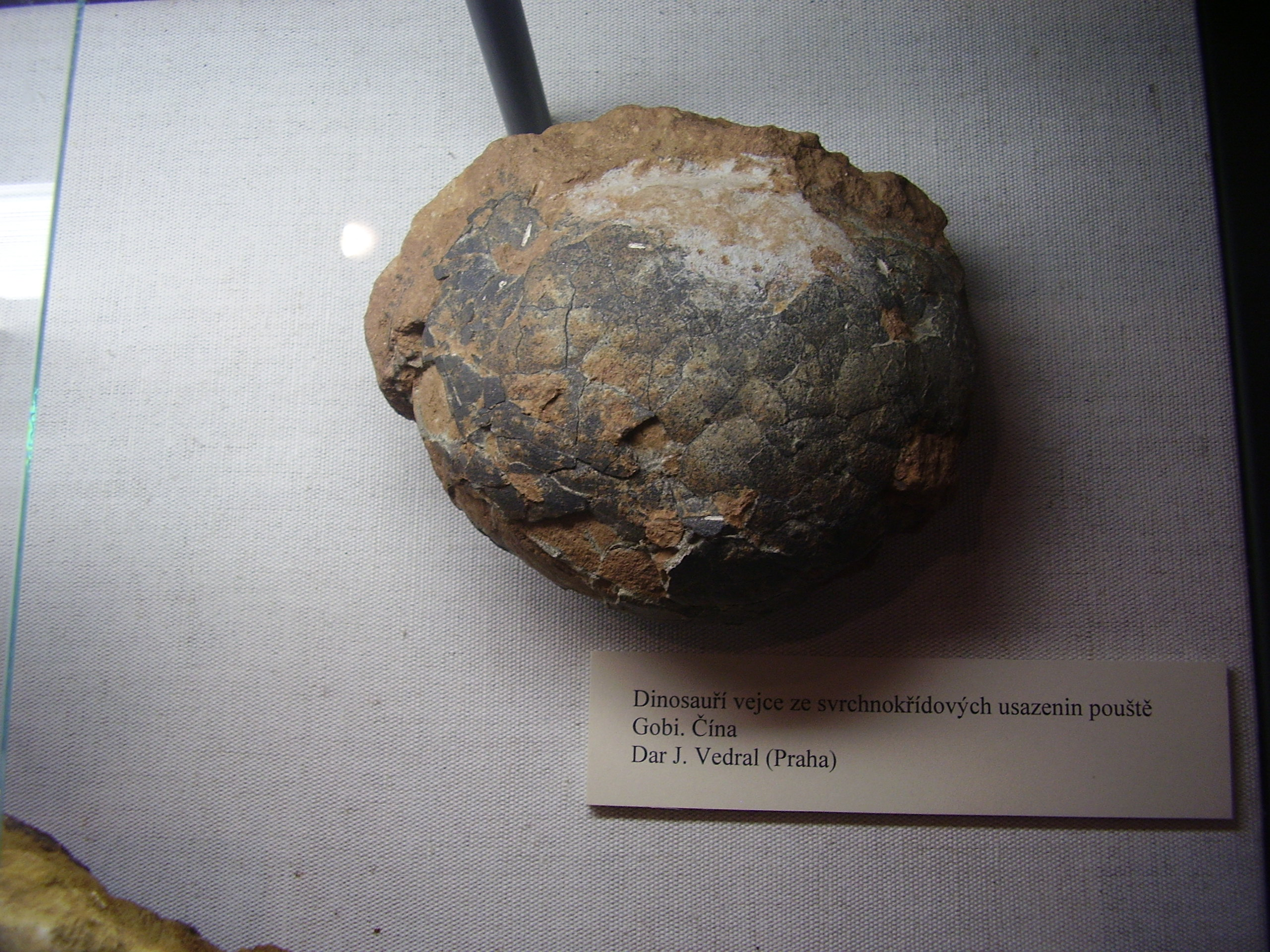
Fossilized dinosaur egg from the Gobi Desert, National Museum in Prague

=== False eggs ===
Calculus: Calculi are egg-like objects formed in the stomachs of ruminants such as cattle, deer, elk, and goats. Calculus formation is a defense mechanism protecting the ruminant's stomach from damage if it swallows a foreign object while grazing. After ingestion, the object is covered by the same material composing bone, calcium phosphate, and eventually vomited out of the animal's system. These "stomach stones" tend to range in size from 1 to 6 centimeters. Larger sizes are known but very rare. Sometimes tiny dimples cover the surface of a stomach stone, which can fool observers into thinking they are the pores of an egg. Fossil egg expert Ken Carpenter has described stomach stones as the most egg-like natural objects, noting that they are "the trickiest [egg-like] objects to correctly identify". Calculi are so egg-like that on one occasion a detailed description of a stomach stone misidentified as a fossil egg was published in the scientific literature. Calculi can be distinguished from real egg fossils because when they are broken open, they show the layers of calcium phosphate and the foreign object at the core. Multiple layers of eggshell are known in pathological eggs, but these layers don't go all the way down to its core the way a stomach stone's do. Calculi are often suspiciously intact, unlike fossil eggs, which are usually damaged. Stomach stones also lack distinct shells with their attending structural components like continuous or prismatic layers, mammillae, and pores.

Concretions: Concretions are formed when decaying organisms change the chemistry of their immediate surroundings in a manner that is conducive to minerals precipitating out of solution. These minerals accumulate in a mass roughly shaped like the region of altered chemistry. Sometimes the mass produced is egg-shaped. Most egg-shaped concretions have uniform interiors, however some form through the accumulation of mineral in layers. These layered concretions can be even harder to recognize than those with uniform interiors because the layers can resemble egg white and yolk. The yellow of the false yolk comes from minerals like limonite, siderite, and sulfur.

Concretions also generally lack distinct shells, although sometimes they can appear to have them if their outside surfaces have been case-hardened. Since their interiors are softer, erosion can separate the two, creating eggshell pseudofossils. Real egg fossils should preserve eggshell structures like pores, mammillae, and prismatic or continuous layers, which are not present in concretions. Any given concretion is unlikely to be exactly the same size as any other, so associations of egg-like objects of different sizes are probably not real eggs at all. Concretions can also be far larger than any real egg so an apparently unnaturally large "egg" has probably been misidentified.

Insect trace fossils: Sometimes the living or breeding chambers of an insect burrow are so perfectly egg-shaped that even a paleontologist can mistake a natural cast of these chambers for a fossil egg. Insect burrow fossils can sometimes be distinguished from real egg fossils by the presence of "scratch marks" on their surface left by the insect during the burrow's original excavation. Fossil insect pupae can also resemble eggs. After death and burial, the decomposition of a deceased pupa would leave a gap in the sediment that could be filled with minerals carried by groundwater, forming an egg-like cast. These pseudo-eggs can be recognized by their small size (usually not much longer than a centimeter or two) and lack of an eggshell with its typical anatomy.

Stones: The erosive effects of water can sometimes round rocks into egg-like shapes.

== Structure ==
Paleontologists' knowledge of the structure of dinosaur eggs is limited to the hard shell. However, it can be inferred that dinosaur eggs had an amnion, chorion, and an allantois, the three major membranes in modern bird and reptile eggs. Dinosaur eggs vary greatly in size and shape, but even the largest non-avian dinosaur eggs (Megaloolithus) are smaller than the largest known bird eggs, which were laid by the extinct elephant bird. Dinosaur eggs range in shape from spherical to highly elongated (some specimens three times longer than they are wide). Some elongated eggs are symmetrical, whereas others have one rounded end and one pointed end (similar to bird eggs). Most elongated eggs were laid by theropods and have an avian-like eggshell, whereas the spherical eggs typically represent non-theropod dinosaurs.

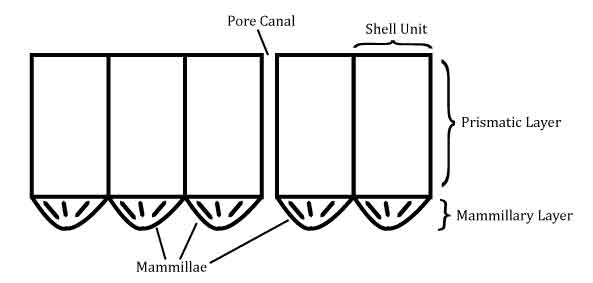
Diagram of a two-layered eggshell.

Fossil dinosaur eggshells, like modern bird and reptile eggshells, are made up of calcium carbonate crystal units. The basic arrangement and structure of these eggshell units (called the ultrastructure) is used to divide fossil eggs into several basic types, including the spherulitic, prismatic, and ornithoid basic types, which contain dinosaurs. Dinosaur eggs further classified by the microstructural aspects of the crystalline structure of the eggshell units and by the type of their pores and their shell ornamentation.

=== Layers ===
Dinosaur eggshells are divided into one, two, or three layers of distinct ultrastructure.

The innermost layer, known as the mammillary layer or the cone layer, is only found in theropod eggs (the prismatic and ornithoid basic types). It is composed of cone-shaped structures called mammillae at the base of each shell unit. Mammillae are the first part of the eggshell to form. Each mammilla forms from crystals radiating outward from an organic core until they touch neighboring mammillae and grow upwards into the next layer. In spherulitic eggs, the eggs of non-theropod dinosaurs, the eggshell units grow upward from their organic cores; the base of each eggshell unit is rounded, but is not a true mammilla because it does not have a distinct ultrastructure from the top of the unit.

The second layer is alternately called the prismatic layer, the columnar layer, the continuous layer, the crystalline layer, the cryptoprismatic layer, the palisade layer, the spongy layer, or the single layer. In this layer, the shell units can be distinct, partially fused together, or entirely continuous. In some dinosaur eggs, the prismatic layer exhibits squamatic ultrastructure, where the prismatic structure is obscured by a rough texture resembling lizard skin.

Though rare in non-avian dinosaurs, some theropod eggs and most bird eggs have a third layer (known as the external layer) made up of vertical calcite crystals.

=== Pore canals ===
In all eggs, the embryo must breathe. In egg-laying amniotes (including dinosaurs), pore canals cutting through the eggshell allow gas exchange between the embryo and the outside world. Dinosaur eggshells exhibit a lot of diversity in pore size, density, and shape. One early attempt at classification of dinosaurian eggs, proposed by the Soviet paleontologist A. Sochava, was based on grouping eggs by their pore systems. This system was abandoned when it was discovered that different eggs could have very similar pores, but pore systems continue to play an important role in modern eggshell parataxonomy. The density and width of the pores, combined with the eggshell's thickness can be used to predict the gas conductance of a dinosaur's egg. This can provide both information about nesting behavior and about the climate: eggs buried in sediment have higher rates of gas conductance than those laid in the open, and eggs laid in arid environments have lower gas conductance (to prevent water loss) than those laid in more humid conditions.

Paleontologist and fossil egg expert Kenneth Carpenter catalogued six types of pore systems:

1. Angusticanaliculate - Long, narrow, straight pores with low pore density. These eggs would have a low gas exchange rate, and therefore they were typically laid in dry areas.
2. Tubocanaliculate - Large diameter pores with funnel-shaped openings on both inner and outer surfaces of the shell. These eggs would have a high gas exchange rate, and therefore were probably buried in humid mounds.
3. Multicanaliculate - Numerous large, branching, and closely spaced pore canals. They have a high gas exchange rate, so like tubocanaliculate eggs they were probably also buried humid mounds.
4. Prolatocanaliculate - Pores vary in width throughout their length. Gas exchange water loss rates are variable, so these eggs could have been laid in many different environments. This type is subdivided into foveocanaliculate with larger pore openings, and lagenocanaliculate with narrower pore openings.
5. Rimocanaliculate - Very narrow slitlike pore canals. This pore system is seen in modern ostriches, so these eggs were laid in open nests, similar to how ostriches do today.
6. Obliquicanaliculate - These canals cut diagonally through multiple eggshell units instead of going between them like in other pore systems. Obliquicanaliculate pores are only found in a single oogenus: Preprismatoolithus.

=== Ornamentation ===
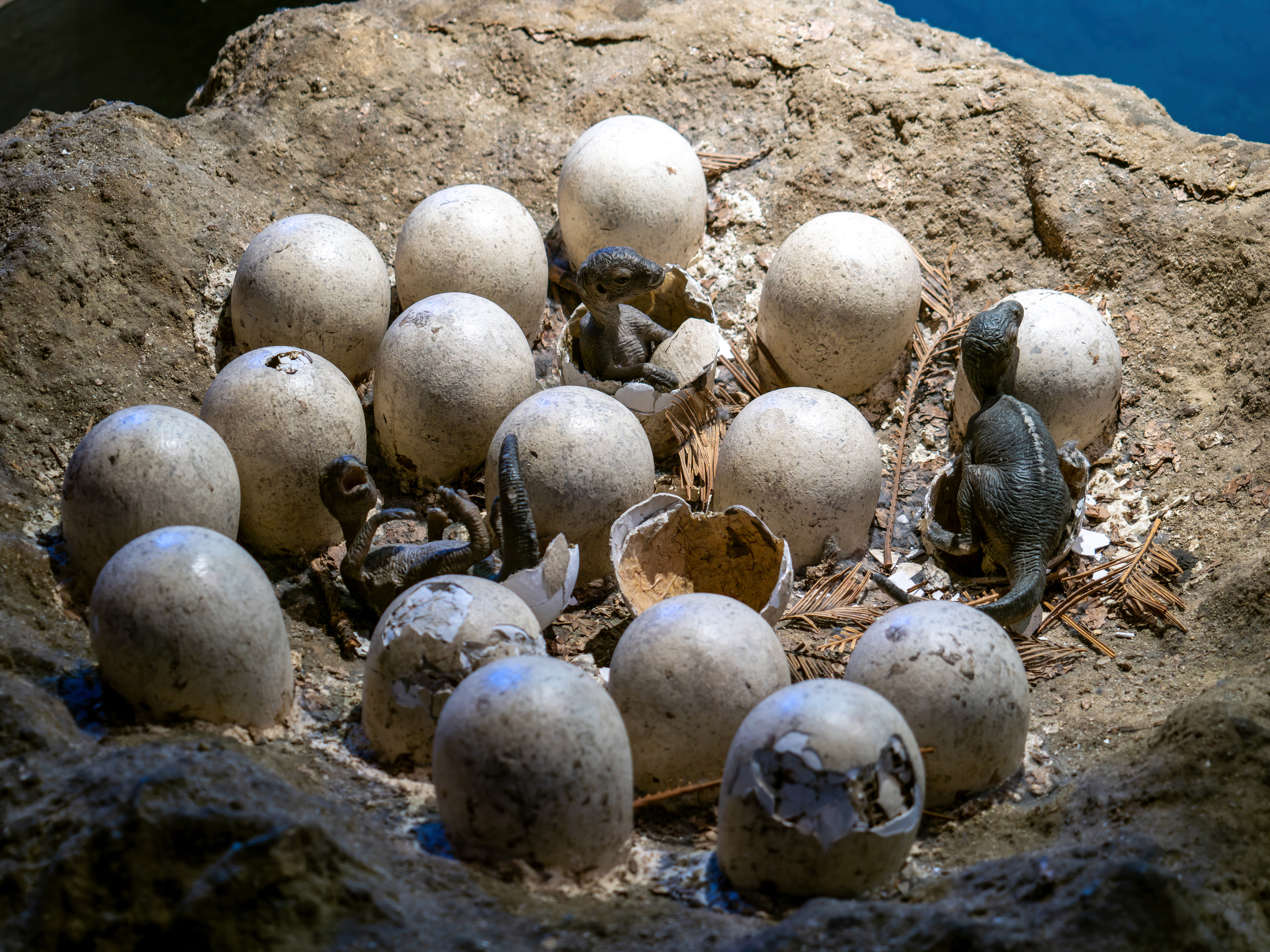
The dinosaur nest, a reconstruction from the National History Museum in London.

Unlike most modern eggs, many non-avian dinosaur eggs had a rough texture formed by nodes and ridges ornamenting the surface of their shell. This is predominant in Cretaceous dinosaur eggs, but very rare in eggs from the Jurassic or Triassic. Because of the lack of modern analogues, the purpose of eggshell ornamentation is unknown, but many functions have been proposed. Possibly, they provided extra strength to the eggshell without having pore canals too long for adequate gas exchange. They could also have helped keep substrate away from the pore openings of eggs that were buried, but modern turtles and crocodylians which bury their eggs have smooth eggshells, so this adaptation is not necessary for animals which bury their eggs. Another hypothesis, proposed by R. M. Mellon in 1982 in his senior thesis at Princeton University, is that the ridges and nodes would have formed pathways for gas to flow across the surface of the eggshell, preventing accumulation of too much CO_{2} and aiding the flow of oxygen and water vapor.

Since it varies from egg to egg, the texture of an eggshell's ornamentation is useful for classification. Six types of ornamentation were catalogued by Carpenter in 1999:

1. Compactituberculate - The dome-shaped tops of the shell units form a dense covering of nodes on the surface of the eggshell. This type of ornamentation is most commonly seen in megaloolithids.
2. Sagenotuberculate - The nodes and ridges form a netlike pattern interspersed with pits and grooves.
3. Dispersituberculate - Scattered nodes. This ornamentation is seen on the poles of elongated eggs, which may have allowed accumulations CO_{2} at the poles to escape between the nodes.
4. Lineartuberculate - Ridges, and chains of ridges and nodes form lines parallel to the long axis of the egg.
5. Ramotuberculate - Irregular chains of nodes, typically found as a transition between the lineartuberculate midsection and dispersituberculate ends of elongated eggs.
6. Anastomotuberculate - Ridges similar to lineartuberculate, but instead form wavy, branching, or anastomosing patterns resembling the water ripple marks in sand.

== Classification ==
The classification of dinosaur eggs is based on the structure of the egg shells viewed in thin section via microscope, although new techniques such as electron backscatter diffraction have been used. There are three main categories of dinosaur eggs: spherulitic (sauropods and hadrosaurs), prismatic, and ornithoid (theropods, including modern birds).

=== Oogenera ===
Oogenera are taxonomic names for types of eggshell. Nearly three dozen oogenera have been named for dinosaur eggs:

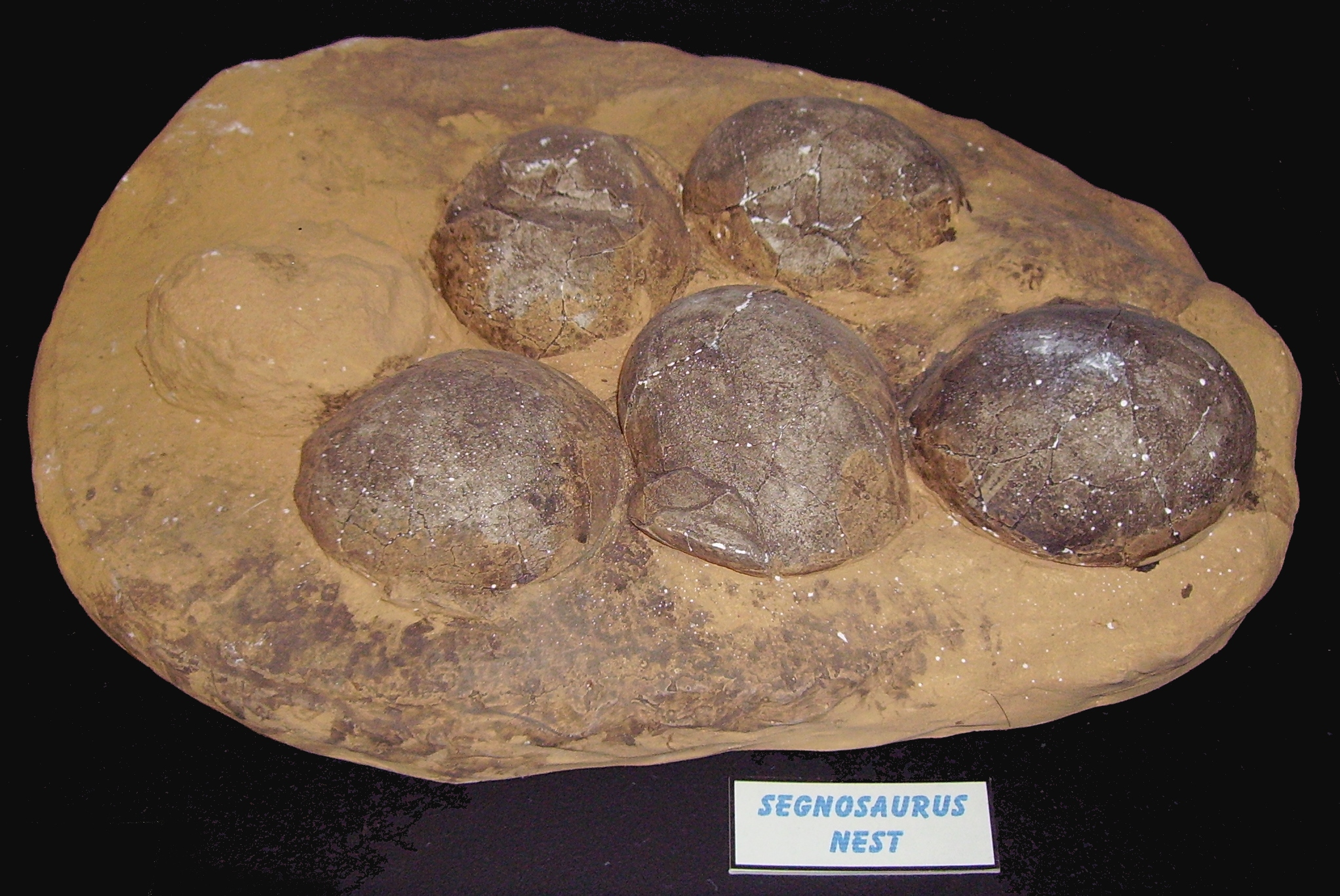
Therizinosaur nest and eggs (cf. Segnosaurus) in from Dinosaurland in Lyme Regis, England.

- Ageroolithus
- Apheloolithus
- Boletuoolithus
- Cairanoolithus
- Continuoolithus
- Dendroolithus
- Dictyoolithus
- Dispersituberoolithus
- Ellipsoolithus
- Elongatoolithus
- Faveoolithus
- Heishanoolithus
- Laevisoolithus
- Macroolithus
- Macroelongatoolithus
- Megaloolithus
- Nanshiungoolithus
- Oblongoolithus
- Ovaloolithus
- Pachycorioolithus
- Paraspheroolithus
- Phaceloolithus
- Placoolithus
- Porituberoolithus
- Polyclonoolithus
- Preprismatoolithus
- Prismatoolithus
- Protoceratopsidovum
- Pseudogeckoolithus
- Shixingoolithus
- Sphaerovum
- Spheroolithus
- Spheruprismatoolithus
- Stromatoolithus
- Subtiliolithus
- Tacuarembovum
- Trachoolithus
- Tristraguloolithus
- Youngoolithus

=== Embryos ===
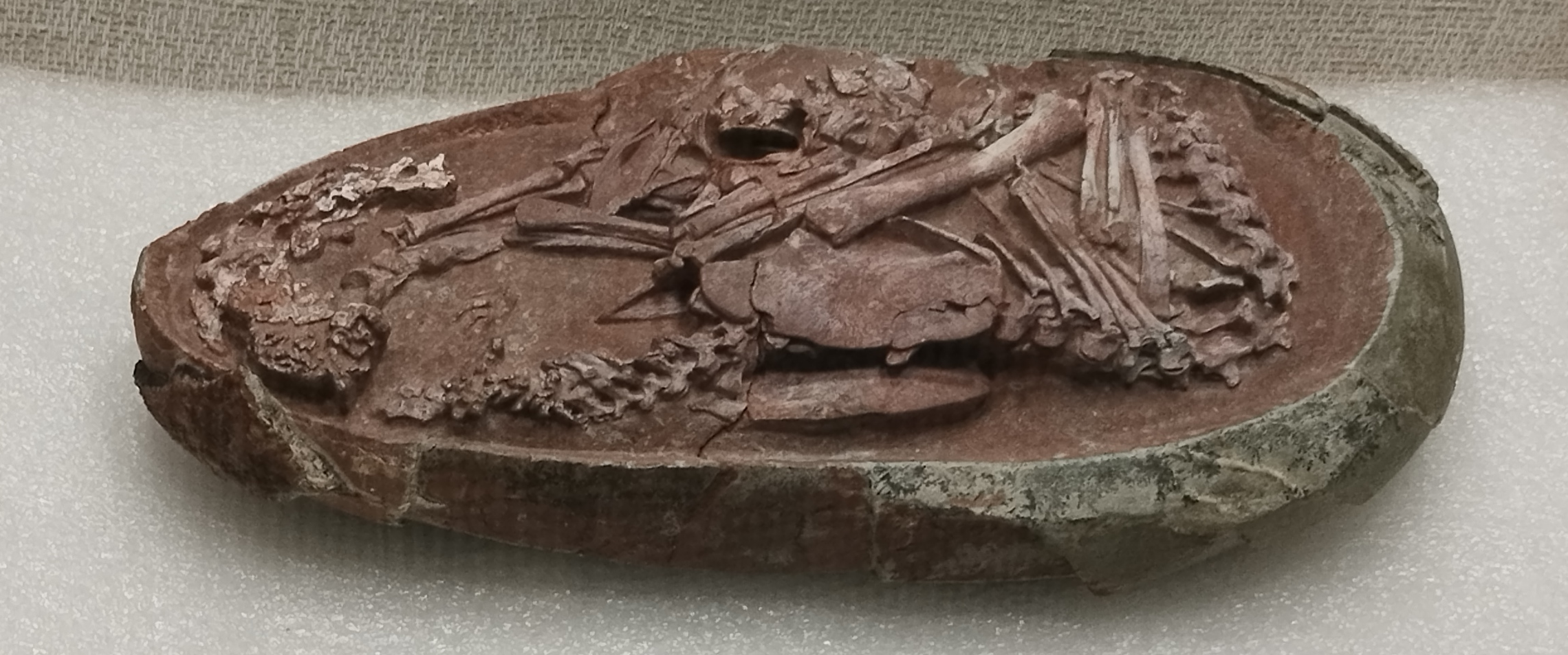
"Baby Yingliang", an especially well-preserved specimen of embryo-bearing Oviraptorid egg

Non-avian dinosaur embryos, the animal inside the eggs, are very rare but useful to understand ontogeny, heterochrony, and dinosaur systematics. Embryo fossils are known from:

- Beibeilong
- Citipati
- Heyuannia
- Hypacrosaurus
- Lufengosaurus
- Lourinhanosaurus
- Massospondylus
- Maiasaura
- Qianlong shouhu
- Troodon

== Taphonomy ==
The formation of fossil eggs begins with the original egg itself. Not all eggs that end up fossilizing experience the death of their embryo beforehand. Fossil eggs with open tops are common and could result from the preservation of eggs that hatched successfully. Dinosaur eggs whose embryos died were likely victims of similar causes to those that kill embryos in modern reptile and bird eggs. Typical causes of death include congenital problems, diseases, suffocation from being buried too deep, inimical temperatures, or too much or too little water.

Whether or not hatching was successful, burial would begin with sediments gradually entering any large openings in the shell. Even intact eggs are likely to fill with sediment once they crack under the strain of deep burial. Sometimes, though, fossilization can begin fast enough to prevent the eggs from being cracked. If the water table is high enough dissolved minerals like calcite can percolate through the pores of the eggshell. When the egg is completely filled it can become sturdy enough to withstand the weight of the overlying sediments. Not all fossil egg specimens are of complete specimens, however. Individual pieces of eggshell are much more robust than the entire egg and can be transported intact long distances from where they were originally laid.

When the egg is buried deeply enough, the bacteria decomposing it no longer have access to oxygen and need to power their metabolisms with different substances. These physiological changes in the decomposers also alter the local environment in a way that allows certain minerals to be deposited, while others remain in solution. Generally, however, a fossilizing egg's shell keeps the same calcite it had in life, which allows scientists to study its original structure millions of years after the developing dinosaur hatched or died. However, eggs can also sometimes be altered after burial. This process is called diagenesis. One form of diagenesis is a microscopic cross-hatched pattern imposed on the eggshell by the pressure of being buried deeply. If the pressure gets severe enough, sometimes the eggshell's internal microscopic structure can be completely destroyed. Diagenesis can also happen chemically in addition to physically. The chemical conditions of a decomposing egg can make it easy for silica to be incorporated into eggshell and damage its structure. When iron-bearing substances alter eggshell it can be obvious because compounds like hematite, pyrite, and iron sulfide can turn the shell blackish or rusty colors.

=== Depositional environments ===
Dinosaur eggs are known from a variety of depositional environments.

Beach sands: Beach sands were a good place for dinosaurs to lay their eggs because the sand would be effective at absorbing and holding enough heat to incubate the eggs. One ancient beach deposit in northeastern Spain actually preserves about 300,000 fossil dinosaur eggs.

Floodplains: Dinosaurs often laid their eggs on ancient floodplains. The mudstones deposited at these sites are therefore excellent sources of dinosaur egg fossils.

Sand dunes: Many dinosaur eggs have been recovered from sandstone deposits that formed in the ancient dune fields of what are now northern China and Mongolia. The presence of Oviraptor preserved in their life brooding position suggests that the eggs, nests, and parents may have been rapidly buried by sandstorms.

== Excavation and preparation ==
Usually the first evidence of fossil dinosaur eggs to be discovered are shell fragments that have eroded away from the original eggs and been transported downhill by the elements. If the source eggs can be found the area must be examined for more unexposed eggs. If the paleontologists are fortunate enough to have found a nest, the number and arrangement of the eggs must be estimated. Excavation must proceed to significant depth since many dinosaur nests include multiple layers of eggs. As the underside of the nest is excavated, it would be covered by material like newspaper, tin foil, or tissue. Afterwards, the entire block is covered in multiple layers of plaster-soaked strips of burlap. When the plaster is dried, the block is undercut the rest of the way and turned over.

The fine work of cleaning the egg fossils is performed in a laboratory. Preparation usually begins from the underside of the block, which tends to be the best preserved. Because of their fragility, cleaning fossil eggs requires patience and skill. Scientists use delicate instruments like dental picks, needles, small pneumatic engraving tools, and X-Acto knives. Scientists must determine at what point to stop cleaning based on their own criteria. If eggs are fully extracted they can be more fully studied individually at the cost of information regarding the spatial relationships between eggs or if the eggs had hatched. Commercial fossil dealers tend to expose only the bottom of the eggs since the topsides might be damaged by hatching and therefore less visually appealing to potential customers.

== Research techniques ==
=== Acid dissolution ===
Acids can be used to learn more about fossil eggs. Diluted acetic acid or EDTA can be used to expose the microstructure of shell that has been damaged by weathering. Acids are also used to extract embryo skeletons from the egg encasing them. Even fossilized soft tissue like muscle and cartilage as well as fat globules from the original egg yolk can be uncovered using this method. Amateur paleontologist Terry Manning has been credited with groundbreaking work developing this technique. First, the paleontologist must submerge the egg in a very dilute phosphoric acid bath. Since the acid solution can penetrate the egg, every few days the specimen must be soaked in distilled water to prevent the acid from damaging the embryo before it is even exposed. If embryonic fossil bone is revealed after drying from the water bath, the exposed fossils must be delicately cleaned with fine instruments like needles and paint brushes. The exposed bone is then coated with plastic preservatives like Acryloid B67, Paraloid B72, or Vinac B15 to protect it from the acid when submerged for another round. The complete process can take months before the whole embryo is revealed. Even then only about 20% of the eggs subjected to the process reveal any embryo fossils at all.

=== CAT scans ===
CAT scans can be used to infer the 3D structure of a fossil egg's interior by compiling images taken of slices through the egg in small regular increments. Scientists have tried to use CAT scans to look for embryo fossils contained inside the egg without having to damage the egg itself by physically extracting them. However, as of Ken Carpenter's 1999 book on dinosaur eggs, Eggs, Nests, and Baby Dinosaurs, all alleged embryos discovered using this method were actually false alarms. Variations in the type of infilling mineral or cement binding the infilling sediment into rock sometimes resemble bones in CAT scan images. Sometimes eggshell fragments that fell back into the egg when it hatched have been mistaken for embryonic bones. The use of CAT scans to search for embryonic remains is actually conceptually flawed since embryonic bones have not yet mineralized. Since the infilling sediment is their only source of minerals they will be preserved at basically the same density and therefore have poor visibility in the scan. The validity of this issue has been confirmed by performing Cat scans on fossil eggs known to have embryos inside and noting their poor visibility in the scan images. The only truly reliable way to discover a dinosaur embryo is to cut the egg open or dissolve some of its eggshell away.

=== Cathodoluminescence ===
Cathodoluminescence is the most important tool paleontologists have for revealing whether or not the calcium in fossil eggshell has been altered. Calcite in eggshell is either pure or rich in calcium carbonate. However, the calcite composing the egg can be altered after burial to include significant calcium content. Cathodoluminescence causes calcite altered in this fashion to glow orange.

=== Gel electrophoresis ===
Gel electrophoresis has been used in attempts to identify the amino acids present in the organic components of dinosaur eggshell. Contact with human skin can contaminate eggs with foreign amino acids, so only untouched eggs can be investigated using this technique. EDTA can be used to dissolve the calcite of the eggshell while leaving the shell's organic content intact. The resultant organic residue would be blended and then implanted into gel. Electricity would then be run through the sample, causing the amino acids to migrate through the gel until they stop at levels determined by their physical properties. Protein silver stain is then used to dye the amino acids and make them visible. The bands of amino acids from the dinosaur eggs can then be compared with the banding of samples with known composition for identification.

Gel electrophoresis is not necessarily a perfect means of discovering the amino acid composition of dinosaur eggshell because sometimes the amount or type of amino acids present could be altered during or after preservation. One potential confounding factor would be the heating of deeply buried egg fossils, which can break down amino acids. Another potential source of error is groundwater, which can leach away amino acids. These issues cast doubt as to whether the results these sorts of studies give are reliable as the actual composition of the eggshell's organic material in life. However, studies applying these techniques have made suggestive findings, including amino acid profiles in dinosaur eggs similar to those in modern birds.

=== Geneva lens measure ===
The Geneva Lens Measure is a device used to measure curved surfaces. It is most commonly used by opticians to measure lenses but can also be used by paleontologists to estimate the life size of dinosaur eggs from shell fragments. The instrument can be used to help estimate the size of fossil eggshells by measuring their curved surfaces. Since most eggs aren't perfectly round measurements from multiple parts of the egg with varying shell curvatures may be needed to get a full idea of the egg's size. Ideally an eggshell fragment being used to estimate the full size of an egg should be more than 3 cm long. Smaller eggshell fragments are better suited to other methods of study, like the Obrig radius dial gauge. The Geneva Lens measure gives units in diopters which must be converted to the radius in millimeters. Use of the Geneva Lens Measure to estimate the size of a fossil egg was first done by Sauer on fossil ostrich eggs.

=== Light microscopy ===
Light microscopy can be used to magnify the structure of dinosaur eggshell for scientific research. To do so an eggshell fragment must be embedded in epoxy resin and sliced into a thin section with a thin-bladed rock saw. This basic method was invented by French paleontologist Paul Gervais and has remained almost unchanged ever since. Horizontally cut thin sections are called tangential thin sections while vertically cut thin sections are called radial sections. Regardless of direction, the sample must be abraded by fine-grit sand or emery paper until it is translucent. Then the structure of the shell's calcite crystals or pores can be examined under a petrographic microscope. The calcite crystal structure of dinosaur eggshell can be classified by their effect on polarized light. Calcite is capable of acting as a polarizing light filter. When a microscopic thin section sample is rotated relative to polarized light it can eventually block all the light and seem opaque. This phenomenon is called extinction. Different varieties of dinosaur eggs with their different calcite crystal structures have different light extinction properties that can be used to identify and distinguish even eggs that seem very similar on the surface. To reconstruct the three-dimensional structures of the shell's pore channels scientists require a series of multiple radial sections.

=== Scanning electron microscopy ===
Scanning electron microscopy is used to view dinosaur eggshell under even greater magnification than is possible with light microscopy. However, this does not mean that scanning electron microscopy is necessarily the superior research method. Since both techniques provide differing amounts and types of information they can be used together synergistically to provide a more complete understanding of the specimen under scrutiny. Eggshell specimens best suited for scanning electron microscopy are those recently broken because such a break will usually occur along the plane of the eggshell's calcite crystal lattice. First, a small specimen would be covered with a very thin layer of gold or platinum. The specimen would then be bombarded with electrons. The electrons bounce back off the metal and due to their small size, can be used to form a detailed image of the specimen.

=== Mass spectrometry ===
Mass spectrometry is a method for determining eggshell composition that uses a device called a mass spectrometer. First, the eggshell sample must be powdered and placed in the mass spectrometer's vacuum chamber. The powder is vaporized by the heat of an intense laser beam. A stream of electrons then bombard the gaseous eggshell molecules, which breaks down the molecules in the eggshell and imbues them with a positive charge. A magnetic field then sorts them by mass before they are detected by the spectrometer. One application of mass spectrometry has been to study the isotope ratios of dinosaur eggshell in order to ascertain their diets and living conditions. However this research is complicated by the fact that isotope ratios can be altered post mortem before or during fossilization. Bacterial decomposition can alter carbon isotope ratios in eggs and groundwater can alter the oxygen isotope ratios of eggshell. More recently, uranium–lead (U–Pb) mass spectrometry has been applied directly to carbonate within dinosaur eggshells, providing absolute age estimates of egg-bearing strata.

=== X rays ===
X-ray equipment, like CAT scans, are used to study the interior of fossil eggs. Unlike CAT scans, x-ray imaging condenses the entire interior of the egg into a single two-dimensional image rather than a series of images documenting the interior in three dimensions. X-ray imaging in the context of dinosaur research has generally been used to look for evidence of embryonic fossils contained inside the egg. However, as of Kenneth Carpenter's 1999 book Eggs, Nests, and Baby Dinosaurs, all putative embryos discovered using x-rays have been misidentifications. This is because the use of x-rays to find embryos is conceptually flawed. Embryo bones are incompletely developed and will generally lack their own mineral content, as such the only source of minerals for these bones is the sediment that fills the egg after burial. The fossilized bones will therefore have the same density as the sediment filling the interior of the egg which served as the source for their mineral content and will be poorly visible in an x-ray image. So far the only reliable method for examining embryonic fossils preserved in dinosaur eggs is to physically extract them through means such as acid dissolution.

X-rays can be used to chemically analyze dinosaur eggshell. This technique requires pure shell samples, so the fossil must be completely free of its surrounding rock matrix. The shell must then be further cleaned by an ultrasonic bath. The sample can then be bombarded by electrons emitted by the same sort of probe used by scanning electron microscopes. Upon impact with the samples x-rays are emitted that can be used to identify the composition of the shell.

X-ray diffraction is a method for determining eggshell composition that uses X-rays to directly bombard powdered eggshell. Upon impact some of the x-rays will be diffracted at different angles and intensities depending on the specific elements present in the eggshell.

Allosterics

In order to test out how allosterics played a part in dinosaur egg size, scientists used modern day animal species such as birds, crocodiles, and tortoises in their experiment. They set the bird group as representing the theropods with the reptiles representing the sauropod group. The laid eggs of each species where compared with one another over the course of the study as well as against the fossilized eggs. The results that was retrieved from the experiment was that while sauropods laid smaller eggs in greater amounts each year, dinosaur of the theropod group was revealed to lay larger eggs less frequently over the years, similar to modern birds today.

== See also ==
- Baby Yingliang
