= Tipoolithus =

Tipoolithus Temporal range: Late Cretaceous

Egg fossil classification
- Basic shell type: Ornithoid
- Morphotype: Ornithoid-ratite
- Oofamily: †Laevisoolithidae
- Oogenus: †Tipoolithus; Garcia et al., 2003

Oospecies
- †T. achloujensis Garcia et al. 2003 (type)

Oogenus of fossil egg

Tipoolithus is an oogenus of fossil egg native to the Irbzer Formation in Morocco. Its classification is uncertain, but it most closely resembles Laevisoolithids, and like members of that oofamily, it was laid by an enantiornithine bird or small theropod.

== Description ==
Tipoolithus is known from 12 small fragments of eggshell, so characteristics of the whole egg (like size and shape) are unknown. The eggshell is thin, between 0.40-0.65 mm. The continuous layer is up to twice as thick as the mammillary layer.

It has an angusticanaliculate pore system, meaning that the pores a narrow, straight, and widely spaced on the eggshell, which is well adapted to a dry environment to prevent water loss through the eggshell. Tipoolithus resembles Porituberoolithus in its microstructure and thickness, and resembles Subtiliolithus in its pore system.

The eggshell of T. achloujensis seems to have dispersituberculate ornamentation, i.e., covered with randomly dispersed nodes, but some fragments show alignments or clusters of nodes, though none are complete enough to determine the full structure of its ornamentation. The nodes have sharp tips.

== Parataxonomy ==
Since the only known eggshells are poorly preserved, classifying Tipoolithus is difficult. It can certainly be classified into the Ornithoid-Ratite morphotype, and its similarity to Subtiliolithus suggests Laevisoolithid (Enantiornithes) affinities.
