= Tubercuoolithus =

Tubercuoolithus Temporal range: Campanian

Egg fossil classification
- Oofamily: incertae sedis
- Oogenus: †Tubercuoolithus; Jackson and Varricchio, 2010

Oospecies
- †T. tetonensis Jackson and Varricchio, 2010 (type)

Dinosaur egg

Tubercuoolithus is an oogenus of dinosaur egg from the early Campanian of Montana.

== Distribution ==
Tubercuoolithus is so far known only from the Two Medicine Formation in Montana, which is dated to the Campanian. The fossils were found in Teton County, at a locality dated to 80 million years old.

== Discovery ==
Fossil eggs are very common at the Two Medicine Formation, including the eggs of Troodon and Maiasaura. However, until 2010 no eggs were known from the lower half of that formation. Then, two paleontologists at the University of Montana, Frankie D. Jackson and David J. Varricchio, discovered a fossil egg site at Sevenmile Hill near the base of the formation. These discoveries included Tubercuoolithus, and constituted the oldest fossil eggs known from the Two Medicine.

== Description ==
Tubercuoolithus is similar to the Mongolian elongatoolithids in that its eggshell is composed of calcite and has two layers, a mammillary layer and a cryptoprismatic layer. However, it has quite distinctive ornamentation; the outer surface of Tubercuoolithus's eggshell is covered with domed nodes, arranged in long wavelike patterns (anastomotuberculate) or irregular chains (ramotuberculate). The eggshell thickness (including ornamentation) ranges between 831 μm and 1186 μm. The cryptoprismatic layer is roughly three times thicker than the mammillary layer. The pores are thin and straight.

Because it is known only from fragments, the size and shape of a complete Tubercuoolithus egg are unknown.

== Classification ==
It is uncertain which oofamily Tubercuoolithus should be classified in. It is similar in microstructure to Elongatoolithidae, but different in ornamentation. Its ornamentation is similar to that of Montanoolithus.
