= Ageroolithus =

Ageroolithus Temporal range: Cretaceous

Egg fossil classification
- Basic shell type: Ornithoid
- Morphotype: Ornithoid-ratite
- Oofamily: incertae sedis
- Oogenus: †Ageroolithus; Vianey-Liaud and López-Martínez, 1997

Oospecies
- A. fontllongensis Vianey-Liaud and Lopez-Martinez, 1997

Dinosaur egg

Ageroolithus is an oogenus of dinosaur egg. It may have been laid by a theropod.

== Distribution ==
Ageroolithus fossils are found in the early Maastrichtian Tremp Basin of Lleida, Spain, from the Upper Cretaceous of France, and from the Lower Cretaceous of Galve, Spain.

== History ==
Ageroolithus was first discovered and described in 1997 by the French paleontologist Monique Vianey-Liaud and the Spanish paleontologist Nieves López Martínez while excavating the Tremp Basin in Spain. Further specimens were discovered in Galve in 1998 and in France in 2000. In 2012, Albert Sellés described Ageroolithus-like eggshells from the Tremp Basin in his PhD thesis at the Universitat de Barcelona.

== Description ==
Ageroolithus fontllongensis was first described on the basis of nine eggshell fragments. Some more recently described eggshell fragments have been referred to A. aff. fontllongensis and cf. Ageroolithus. The eggshell has a smooth surface, and at 25–36 mm thick is thinner than most other eggs of the ratite morphotype. Erosion and recrystallization heavily affect most Ageroolithus specimens, but a few fragments are well enough preserved to observe the microstructure. It has two structural layers with a sharp dividing line between them. The inner layer, known as the mammillary layer, is composed of wedges and shows distinct growth lines, whereas the outer layer (the prismatic layer) is not clearly divided into units. It has narrow, straight pore canals measuring 15 to 25 μm in diameter.

The specimens referred to cf. Ageroolithus by Sellés in 2012 are very similar to Ageroolithus in thickness, ornamentation, and the ratio between prismatic and mammillary layers. They differ from Ageroolithus because their shell is composed of three structural layers instead of two.

== Parataxonomy ==
Ageroolithus has not been placed in any known oofamily, but it is classified in the ratite morphotype, alongside Elongatoolithidae, Laevisoolithidae, Medioolithidae, and Ornitholithidae. It contains a single oospecies: A. fontllongensis.

== See also ==
- List of dinosaur oogenera
