= Mirador del Cretaci =

Paleontological site in Catalonia, Spain

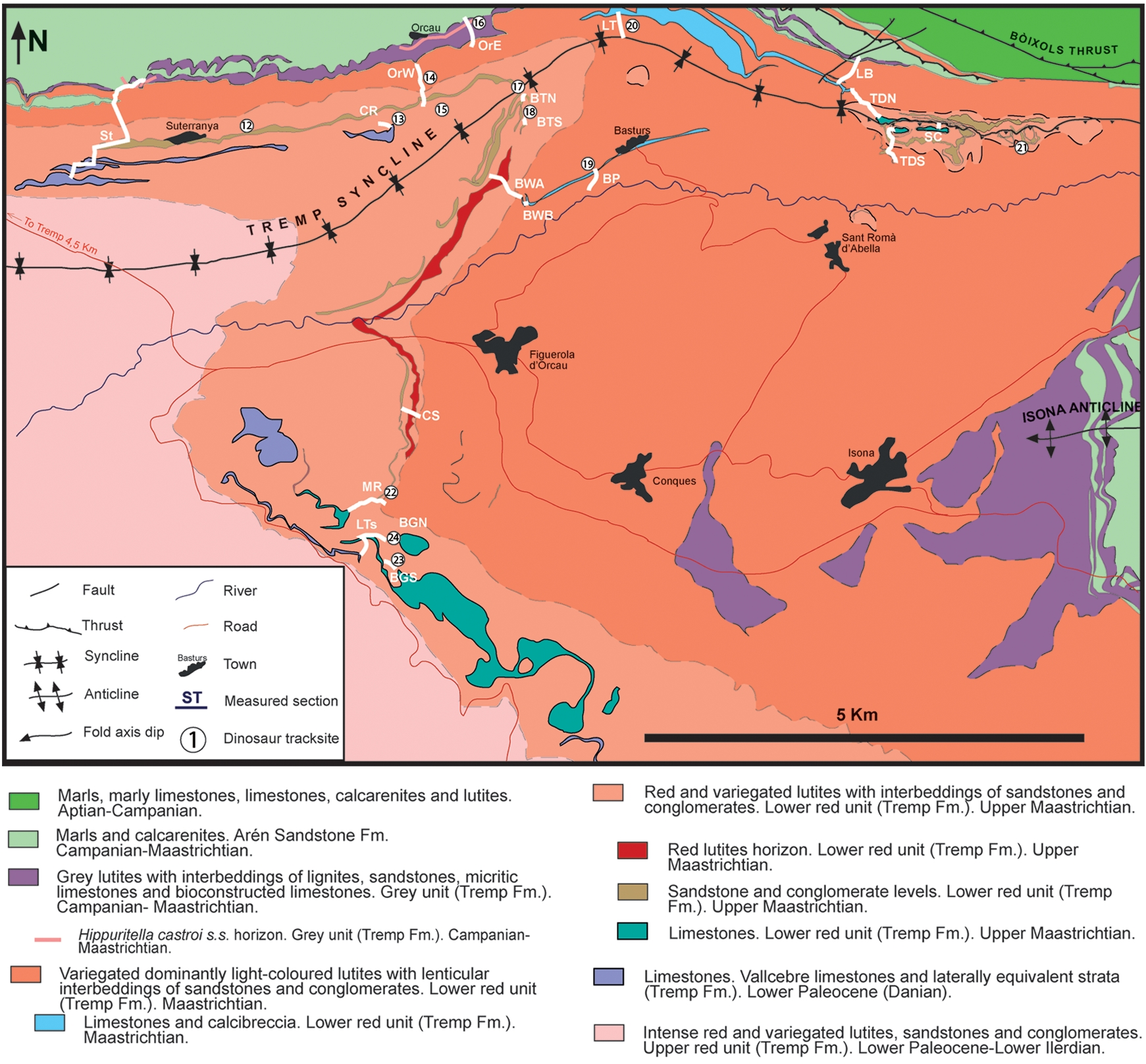
The Tremp Formation, of which Mirador del Cretaci is a part of

Mirador del Cretaci, also known as El Mirador, is a paleontological site in Catalonia, Spain. Mainly found at the site are fossils of dinosaur footprints, eggshell fragments and bone fragments, although the partial skeleton of the sebecid crocodyliform Ogresuchus is also known from this site.

== History ==
The Mirador del Cretaci site was not identified until the mid-20th century when a group of French, Dutch and German scientists traveled to the area to study the geology of this region. Sometime before their arrival in the region, the area had been partially looted and some of the looted fossils ended up in the collections of museums around the world - the rest were probably sold on a black market.

The Coll de Nargó Dinosaur Museum (Dinosfera) was eventually built to house the fossils found at Mirador del Cretaci.

The Mirador del Cretaci site was vandalised in 2015 and it was restored by 2019.
