= Pachycorioolithus =

Pachycorioolithus Temporal range: Albian

Egg fossil classification
- Oofamily: †Pachycorioolithidae; Lawver et al., 2016
- Oogenus: †Pachycorioolithus; Lawver et al., 2016

Oospecies
- †P. jinyunensis Lawver et al., 2016 (type)

Pachycorioolithus is an oogenus of small, thin-shelled fossil egg from the early Cretaceous in China. It probably belongs to a bird, though there is a possibility the parent was a non-avian theropod. It was named in 2016, based on a single specimen found in Zhejiang.

== Description ==
Pachycorioolithus is represented in the fossil record by a single, 80% complete fossil egg. It is elongated, measuring 50 mm (2.0 in) long by 32 mm (1.3 in) across, and smooth-surfaced. Thin pores (20 to 30 μm in diameter) cut through the eggshell.

The eggshell is very thin, measuring only 166 μm thick, and is composed of three structural layers: the mammillary, continuous, and external layers. Pachycorioolithus is unique for having an external layer thicker than its continuous layer, with an external to continuous layer ratio of 1.6:1. This sets it apart from nearly all other known eggs. An unnamed Brazilian fossil egg also has an external layer thicker than continuous layer, but only barely thicker. Also, a few modern bird eggs have a similar, extremely thick external layer. These examples appear to result from convergent evolution, as they represent isolated cases in different clades.

Based on its unique characteristics, Lawver et al. (2016) assigned Pachycorioolithus to its own monotypic oofamily, Pachycorioolithidae. Pachycorioolithidae is the only theropod oofamily endemic to East Asia.

== Parentage ==
Though no embryo was found in the egg, Pachycorioolithus can be referred to Theropoda by the characteristics of its eggshell. However, it is uncertain whether the parent was a bird or not. Most non-avian dinosaurs have a two- or one-layered eggshell, whereas birds typically have a three-layered eggshell (like Pachycorioolithus). However, most Mesozoic bird eggs have only two layers and some non-avian dinosaur eggs have three layers, so this trait alone cannot be used to identify bird eggs. Lawver et al. (2016) believed it likely that P. jinyunensis pertains to a bird because of its small size and extremely thin shell, but they could not exclude the possibility that it was laid by a small, non-avian, theropod.

== Distribution ==
The only known P. jinyunensis specimen was discovered in a quarry near Shuhong, a town in Jinyun County in Zhejiang. This site is part of the Liangtoutang Formation, dating to the Albian.

== Discovery and Naming ==
Pachycorioolithus was first described in 2016 by a team of paleontologists consisting of Daniel R. Lawver and Frankie D. Jackson of the Montana State University, Jin Xingsheng of the Zhejiang Museum of Natural History, and Wang Qiongying of the Jinyun Museum. It was based on a single egg specimen housed in the Jinyun Museum. They gave it the name Pachycorioolithus jinyunensis, from the Greek "pachys" (thick) and "corys" (helmet), a reference to its thick outer layer, combined with "oolithus", the standard suffix for oogenus names, meaning "stone egg". The specific epithet means "from Jinyun", the county where it was found.
