= Sankofa (oogenus) =

Sankofa Temporal range: Late Cretaceous

Egg fossil classification
- Basic shell type: †Dinosauroid-prismatic
- Oofamily: †Prismatoolithidae
- Oogenus: †Sankofa; López-Martínez & Vicens, 2012

Oospecies
- †S. pyrenaica López-Martínez and Vicens, 2012 (type)

Oogenus of prismatoolithid egg

Sankofa is an oogenus of prismatoolithid egg. They are fairly small, smooth-shelled, and asymmetrical. Sankofa may represent the fossilized eggs of a transitional species between non-avian theropods and birds.

== Etymology ==
The name Sankofa comes from the Ashante word "sankofa", meaning 'learning from the past', symbolized by a bird with an egg in its bill. The oospecific epithet pyrenaica refers to the Pyrenees, where the eggs were first discovered.

== Distribution ==
Sankofa pyrenaica is known solely from the Aren Formation, in the southern Pyrenees of Catalonia, Spain, dating from the Upper Campanian to Lower Maastrichtian.

== Description ==
Sankofa eggs are uniformly 7 cm long and 4 cm wide, and their eggshell averages 0.27 mm thick. The eggshell consists of two layers, the prismatic (or palisade) layer and the mammillary layer, similar to most other non-avian dinosaur eggshells. In Sankofa, these two layers have a gradual boundary, and the mammillary layer is much thinner than the prismatic. The prismatic has a slightly squamatic microstructure, very similar to the eggs of Troodon and other prismatoolithids, a step towards the fully squamatic texture of bird eggs. The eggshell has a smooth surface with no trace of ornamentation, and highly variable pore density.

The most significant characteristic of Sankofa is its shape: they are asymmetric, with an ovoid shape, like bird eggs. A morphometric analysis by López-Martínez and Vicens in 2012 found that it was an intermediate shape between avian and non-avian theropods, and also very similar to an enantiornithine egg from the Bajo de la Carpa Formation in Argentina, though their microstructures are quite different.

== Classification ==
Parataxonomically, Sankofa is classified in the oofamily Prismatoolithidae, because of its microstructure. Cladistic analysis found Sankofa to be in a polytomy with Protoceratopsidovum, Troodon eggs, and birds. The mosaic of avian and non-avian characteristics makes it uncertain whether S. pyrenaica was laid by a bird or a non-avian theropod, and provides further evidence for the theory that birds evolved from dinosaurs. It probably represents a transitional form between the two groups.
