= Liangtoutang Formation =

Geologic formation in China

- Stratigraphic range: Albian-Cenomanian; ~105.9–96 Ma
- Type: Geological formation
- Unit of: Tiantai Group
- Underlies: Chichengshan Formation
- Overlies: Tangshang Formation
- Thickness: About 300 m (980 ft)

Lithology
- Primary: Sandstone

Location
- Coordinates: 28.7°N 120.2°E
- Approximate paleocoordinates: 36.3°N 120.0°E
- Region: Zhejiang
- Country: China
- Extent: Huzhen Basin
- Liangtoutang Formation (China) Liangtoutang Formation (Zhejiang)

The Liangtoutang Formation, also referred to as the Laijia Formation is a geological formation located in Zhejiang, China. Its strata date back to the Albian to Cenomanian stages of the Cretaceous period, between 105.9 and 96 million years ago. The lithology primarily consists of red sandstone.

== Fossil content ==
Color key: Taxon / Reclassified taxon / Taxon falsely reported as present / Dubious taxon or junior synonym / Ichnotaxon / Ootaxon / Morphotaxon	Notes; Uncertain or tentative taxa are in small text; ~~crossed out~~ taxa are discredited.

=== Dinosaurs ===
==== Ornithischians ====
Ornithischians of the Liangtoutang Formation
Genus	Species	Location	Stratigraphic position	Material	Notes	Images
Jinyunpelta	J. sinensis			An almost complete skull and two partial postcranial skeletons	A ankylosaurine ankylosaurid	
Yueosaurus	Y. tiantaiensis			Partial postcranial skeleton	A thescelosaurine thescelosaurid	

==== Theropods ====
Theropods of the Liangtoutang Formation
Genus	Species	Location	Stratigraphic position	Material	Notes	Images
Therizinosauria Indet.	Indeterminate				A therizinosaur; informally known as "Tiantaisaurus sifengensis".	

=== Oofossils ===
Oofossil of the Liangtoutang Formation
Genus	Species	Location	Stratigraphic position	Material	Notes	Images
Macroelongatoolithus	M. xixiaensis					
Pachycorioolithus	P. jinyunensis					
Testudoolithus	T. jiangi					
