= Arriagadoolithus =

Arriagadoolithus Temporal range: Late Cretaceous

Egg fossil classification
- Basic shell type: †Dinosauroid-prismatic
- Oofamily: †Arriagadoolithidae
- Oogenus: †Arriagadoolithus; Agnolin et al., 2012

Oospecies
- Arriagadoolithus patagoniensis Agnolin et al., 2012 (Type)

Arriagadoolithus is the oogenus of fossil eggs which includes the eggs of the alvarezsaurid Bonapartenykus. Fossils of the creature were found in Patagonia; it may have brooded on its eggs.

== Description ==
Arriagadoolithus patagoniensis is known from two partial eggs both found associated with a skeleton of Bonapartenykus ultimus. The eggs are about 77 mm (3.0 in) in maximum width, but the length of the eggs and whether or not they were symmetric are unknown.

Unlike most non-avian dinosaur eggs, Arriagadoolithus's shell has three layers (external, prismatic, and mammillary). The shell is approximately 1 mm (0.039 in) thick.

The outer surface of its eggshell is covered with two distinct ornamentation patterns: the unique dendro-reticulate ornament, made up of randomly interconnecting ridges with nodes along the ridges or where they intersect; and the plexi-ramo-tuberculate ornament, made up of widely spaced irregularly shaped nodes and ridges. The dendro-reticulate ornamentation was found only on fragments.

The pores of Arriagadoolithus are unusually wide, with funnel-like openings up to 271 μm in diameter. The pores cut straight through the eggshell (representing a tubocanaliculate pore system) or obliquely (obliquicanaliculate pore system).

== Palaeobiology ==
Even though they contain no embryos, Arriagadoolithus eggs are known to belong to the alvarezsaurid dinosaur Bonapartenykus because the fossils were found in close association. It is possible that the Bonapartenykus was sitting on the eggs, representing another instance of brooding in dinosaur parents such as oviraptorids or Troodon. However, no nest was found associated with the remains, so Agnolin et al. 2012 believed that brooding is implausible. They alternately suggested that the eggs may not have been laid yet and were still inside the Bonapartenykus when they were fossilized.

Fossilized remains of fungal growths were discovered on the inside of the eggshell, similar to the discovery of fungi within a turtle egg in China. The fungus probably contaminated the Arriagadoolithus eggs while they still contained organic material.

== Classification ==
Arriagadoolithus is a monotypic oogenus containing A. patagoniensis. It is classified alongside Triprismatoolithus in the oofamily Arriagadoolithidae.

== Distribution ==
The two eggs of Arriagadoolithus were found in Río Negro Province, Patagonia, Argentina, though presumably the same type of eggs existed throughout Bonapartenykus's distribution, including Neuquén Province as well. It is dated to the Santonian to Maastrichtian stages of the Upper Cretaceous.
