= Irbzer Formation =

Geological formation in Morocco

- Stratigraphic range: Maastrichtian-Paleocene; ~70–60 Ma
- Type: Geological formation
- Area: Fes-Boulmane

Lithology
- Primary: Gray mudstone

Location
- Coordinates: 33°1′N 4°8′W
- Approximate paleocoordinates: 24°5′N 5°2′W
- Region: Fes-Boulmane
- Country: Morocco
- Irbzer Formation (Morocco)

The Irbzer Formation is a geological formation located in Morocco in the area of Fes-Boulmane of latest Cretaceous (Maastrichtian) to Paleocene age. The lower section of this formation consists of yellowish, cross-bedded calcareous sandstone containing shark teeth, while the layer above comprises phosphatic marls with vertebrate bone beds, including dinosaur remains.

== Description ==
The Irbzer Formation is 100–440 m thick, that records the transition from marginal-marine to continental environments. It is divided into three members: Lower member (20–190 m): begins with marine-influenced phosphatic sandstones, sandy limestones and marly limestones rich in marine fossils (shark teeth, mosasaurs, bivalves), then passes upward into thick white-to-varicoloured marls, often gypsiferous, with charophytes, ostracods and dinosaur eggshell fragments. Middle member (2–55 m): sharp-based terrigenous interval resting on an erosive disconformity; composed of red sandstones, channelized polymictic conglomerates and siltstones with cross-bedding, ripples and bioturbation, reflecting fluvial-alluvial deposition. Finally, the Upper member (25–170 m): dominantly varicoloured or gray marls with basal gypsum in many sections, thin sandstones and occasional charophyte levels; deposited in restricted lacustrine–floodplain settings.

== Paleoenvironment ==
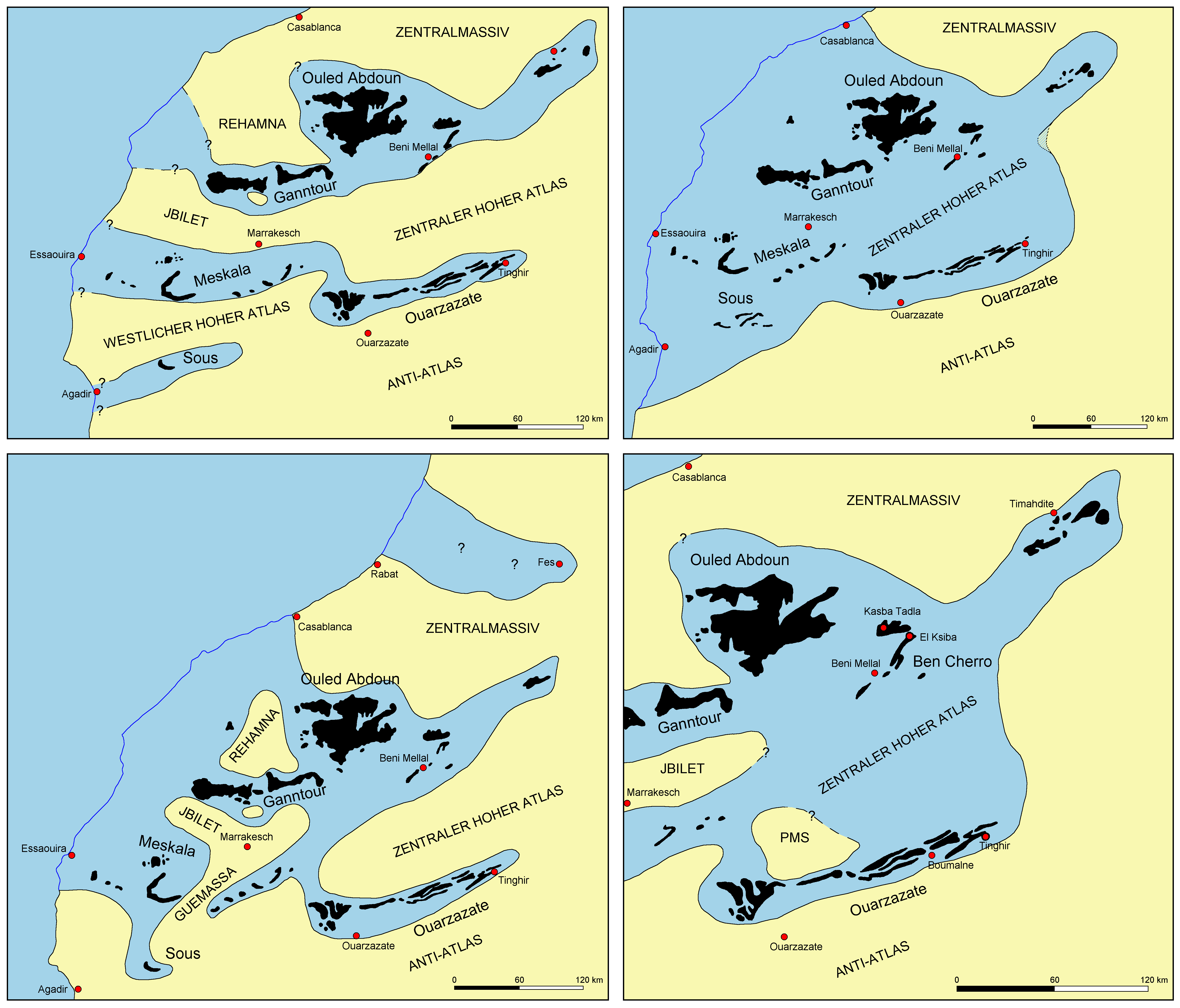
Reconstructions of the "Phosphate sea" of Morocco. The Irbzer Formation area is seen at the NE

During the Maastrichtian the inner area was situated within an anoxic marine setting, as revelated by bituminous, very oily and dolomitic black shells. Palynology of the underliying and coeval El Koubbat Formation has revelated an microbiota composed of Dinoflagellates, Pterospermopsis, Scolecodonts and Tasmanaceae.

The formation reflects a shallow marine to lagoonal setting, transitioning from fine sands to marls and limestones. The presence of marine organisms, including bivalves and gastropods, along with phosphatic layers containing fish remains, indicates periodic marine incursions, with intermittent lagoonal or nearshore conditions. Oxidation and sedimentary discontinuities suggest episodes of exposure or subaerial erosion. The overall environment was likely a shallow, low-energy, marginal marine setting with occasional deeper marine influences. No planktonic foraminifera are present, and the few benthic foraminifera offer limited ecological insights. However, ostracodes, though poorly preserved, are more abundant and provide significant information about the environment. The ostracode assemblage including indicates a shallow (0–20 m), oligohaline, moderately alkaline, and relatively warm limnic environment, likely permanent and near the shoreline, as suggested by the presence of isolated dinosaur teeth and eggshell fragments in these layers.

Marine Amniote fauna is known from coeval layers of the El Koubbat Formation, mostly Mosasaurs (Halisaurinae, Gavialimimus, Globidens, Mosasaurus, Prognathodontini) and Elasmosauridae plesiosaurs.

== Biota ==
Color key: Taxon / Reclassified taxon / Taxon falsely reported as present / Dubious taxon or junior synonym / Ichnotaxon / Ootaxon / Morphotaxon	Notes; Uncertain or tentative taxa are in small text; ~~crossed out~~ taxa are discredited.

=== Charophytes ===
Genus	Species	Location	Material	Notes	Images
Feistiella	F. sp.	Oudiksou syncline	Gyrogonites	A charophyte of the family Feistiellaceae	
Lagynophora	L. liburnica	Oudiksou syncline	Gyrogonites	A charophyte of the family Characeae	
Lamprothamnium	L. sp.	Oudiksou syncline	Gyrogonites	A charophyte of the family Characeae	
Porochara	P. stacheana	Oudiksou syncline	Gyrogonites	A charophyte of the family Characeae	
Sphaerochara	S. cf. edda	Oudiksou syncline	Gyrogonites	A charophyte of the family Characeae	
Stephanochara	S. sp.	Oudiksou syncline	Gyrogonites	A charophyte of the family Characeae	

=== Ostracods ===
Genus	Species	Location	Material	Notes	Images
Brachycythere	B. cf. gr. sapucariensis	El Koubbat	Valves	A marine Ostracod of the family Brachycytheridae	
Clithrocytheridea	C. senegali	El Koubbat	Valves	A marine Ostracod of the family Cytherideidae	
Costa	C. sp	El Koubbat	Valves	A marine Ostracod of the family Trachyleberididae	
Cytheretta	C.? koubbatensis	El Koubbat	Valves	A marine Ostracod of the family Cytherettidae	
Cytherella	C. sp	El Koubbat	Valves	A marine Ostracod of the family Cytherellidae	
Gomphocythere	G. achloujensis	Achlouj	Valves	A freshwater Ostracod of the family Limnocytheridae	
Oertliella	O. sp.	El Koubbat	Valves	A marine Ostracod of the family Trachyleberididae	
Rehacythereis	R. sp	El Koubbat	Valves	A marine Ostracod of the family Trachyleberididae	
Paracandona	P. occitanica	Achlouj	Valves	A freshwater Ostracod of the family Candonidae	
Paracypris	P. cf. mdaouerensis; P. sp.; P.? sp.	El Koubbat	Valves	A marine Ostracod of the family Paracyprididae	

=== Echinoderms ===
Genus	Species	Location	Material	Notes	Images
Cretasterias	C. reticulatus	Bakrit	Thousands of specimens	A sea star of the family Asteriidae	

=== Fish ===
Genus	Species	Location	Material	Notes	Images
Cretalamna	C. maroccana	Oukdiksou syncline	Teeth	A Shark of the family Otodontidae	Cretalmana reconstruction
Dalpiazia	D. strollleri	Oukdiksou syncline	Teeth	A Chondrichthian of the family Sclerorhynchidae	
Ganopristis	G. leptodoll	Oukdiksou syncline	Teeth	A Chondrichthian of the family Sclerorhynchidae	
Serratolamna	S. serrata	Oukdiksou syncline	Teeth	A Shark of the family Serratolamnidae	
Squalicorax	S. pristodontus; S. bassallii	Oukdiksou syncline	Teeth	A Shark of the family Anacoracidae	Squalicorax reconstruction

=== Crocodylomorpha ===
Genus	Species	Location	Material	Notes	Images
Krokolithidae	Indeterminate	Oukdiksou syncline	eggshells	Indeterminate Crocodilian eggshells	

=== Sauropoda ===
Genus	Species	Location	Material	Notes	Images
Megaloolithus	M. maghrebiensis; M. sp.	Achlouj 2, levels 17 to 19,	eggshells	Eggshells referred to Titanosauridae sauropods	Example of Megaloolithus
Pseudomegaloolithus	P. atlasi	Achlouj 2, level 18-19	eggshells	Indeterminate Sauropod eggshells	

=== Theropoda ===
Genus	Species	Location	Material	Notes	Images
Pseudogeckoolithus	P. tirboulensis	Achlouj 2, levels 17 to 19	eggshells	Theropod eggs referred to Maniraptora	
Rodolphoolithus	R. arioul	Achlouj 2, levels 18 to 19	eggshells	Indeterminate eggs likely laid by non-avian or avian theropods	
"Paronychodon"	"P. sp."	Oukdiksou syncline	Teeth	A theropod, probably related with Troodontidae or Unenlagiinae	
Tipoolithus	T. achloujensis	Achlouj 2, levels 18 to 19	eggshells	Theropod eggs, referred to an enantiornithine bird or small Coelurosaur	
