= Arriagadoolithidae =

Arriagadoolithidae Temporal range: Late Cretaceous

Egg fossil classification
- Basic shell type: †Dinosauroid-prismatic
- Oofamily: †Arriagadoolithidae; Agnolin et al., 2012

Oogenera
- Arriagadoolithus; Triprismatoolithus

Arriagadoolithidae is an oofamily of fossil eggs, representing the eggs of Alvarezsaurs.

== Description ==
The eggs are well stratified with three layers: the external, the prismatic, and the mammillary. The connection between prismatic and external layers is abrupt. The eggshell is similar to that of birds, and has ornamentation similar to that of Elongatoolithids.

== History ==
Previously, Arriagadoolithid eggs were considered to be Elongatoolithids, because the similarities in shell ornamentation. However, they have quite distinct eggshell structure, which was recognized by Jackson and Varricchio (2010) when they named a new oogenus, Triprismatoolithus. The oofamily was first described in 2012, following the discovery of fossil eggs associated with the Alvarezsaur, Bonapartenykus; Agnolin et al erected a new oogenus, Arriagadoolithus, and oofamily, Arriagadoolithidae, to contain Arriagadoolithus and Triprismatoolithus.

== Palaeobiology ==
Arriagadoolithus eggs are known to belong to Bonapartenykus, because the fossils were found in close association. Triprismatoolithus has not been found in association with any skeletal remains; however, the close resemblance between Triprismatoolithus and Arriagadoolithus implies that Triprismatoolithus may be the eggs of an as-of-yet unknown Alvarezsaurid.
