= Porcupine Hills Formation =

Hill formation in Alberta, Canada

- Stratigraphic range: Paleocene
- Type: Geological formation
- Underlies: erosional surface
- Overlies: Willow Creek Formation
- Thickness: up to 1,200 metres (3,940 ft)

Lithology
- Primary: Shale
- Other: Sandstone, mudstone, siltstone

Location
- Coordinates: 49.78753°N 113.88020°W
- Region: Alberta
- Country: Canada

Type section
- Named for: Porcupine Hills (Alberta)
- Named by: G.M. Dawson, 1883

The Porcupine Hills Formation is a stratigraphic unit of middle to late Paleocene age in the Western Canada Sedimentary Basin. It takes its name from the Porcupine Hills of southwestern Alberta, and was first described in outcrop by George Mercer Dawson in 1883.

== Lithology ==
The Porcupine Hills Formation is composed primarily of mudstones, siltstones and sandstones. The sediments were derived from the Canadian Cordillera during tectonic uplift and erosion in the late stages of the Laramide Orogeny, and were transported eastward by river systems and deposited in fluvial and floodplain environments.

The mudstones are characterized by well-developed paleosols and caliche nodules, and the sandstones are cross-bedded and cemented with calcite. In contrast to the Paskapoo Formation, an equivalent formation farther to the north, there are no coaly beds. This has given rise to the hypothesis that during the deposition of the Porcupine Hills Formation the climate was semi-arid, while the climate farther north was more humid.

== Distribution ==
The Porcupine Hills Formation is present in southwestern Alberta, from the Waterton River near the Canada–US border in the south to the Bow River near Calgary in the north. The upper limit is the present day erosional surface, so its original thickness can not be determined; however, the maximum recorded thickness is 1,200 metres (3,940 ft) in the Porcupine Hills.

== Relationship to other units ==
The Porcupine Hills Formation is exposed at surface or is overlain by Quaternary sediments. Its base is a thick sandstone that rests disconformably on a paleosol horizon of the underlying Willow Creek Formation.

In the north near the Bow River, the Porcupine Hills Formation grades into the equivalent Paskapoo Formation. It is correlated with upper part of the Ravenscrag Formation of southern Saskatchewan and the Fort Union Formation of Montana and North Dakota, which are not contiguous with it but are of similar age.
