= Rodolphoolithus =

Rodolphoolithus Temporal range: Upper Maastrichtian

Egg fossil classification
- Basic shell type: Ornithoid
- Morphotype: Ornithoid-ratite
- Oofamily: †Elongatoolithidae
- Oogenus: †Rodolphoolithus; Vianey-Liaud and Garcia, 2003

Oospecies
- †Rodolphoolithus arioul Vianey-Liaud and Garcia, 2003 (type)

Oogenus of elongatoolithid egg

Rodolphoolithus is an oogenus of elongatoolithid egg native to the Irbzer Formation of Morocco. It is known only from a single partial egg and several eggshell fragments, but it probably had a highly elongated shape like other Elongatoolithids. They have an eggshell with two layers: a mamillary layer and a continuous layer. The mamillary layer is relatively thick (compared to other Elongatoolithids); it is one-half to two-thirds the thickness of the continuous layer. The ornamentation of its outer surface is ramotuberculate, i.e. covered with low, irregular ridges. The pore system cannot be observed due to recrystallization of the fossilized eggshell. Like other Elongatoolithids, Rodolphoolithus was laid by small theropods.
