= Tristraguloolithus =

Tristraguloolithus Temporal range: Late Campanian

Egg fossil classification
- Basic shell type: Ornithoid
- Morphotype: Ornithoid-ratite
- Oogenus: †Tristraguloolithus; Zelenitsky, Hills & Currie, 1996

Dinosaur egg

Tristraguloolithus is an oogenus of dinosaur egg from the late Campanian of Alberta.

== See also ==
- List of dinosaur oogenera
