= Subtiliolithus =

Subtiliolithus Temporal range: Late Cretaceous

Egg fossil classification
- Basic shell type: Ornithoid
- Morphotype: Ornithoid-ratite
- Oofamily: †Laevisoolithidae
- Oogenus: †Subtiliolithus; Mikhailov, 1991

Subtiliolithus is an oogenus of fossil egg from the Nemegt Formation of Mongolia and the Ohyamashimo Formation of Japan. The eggs are notable for a very thin eggshell. It contains three oospecies: S. hyogoensis, S. kachchhensis and S. microtuberculatus. They were originally classified as a distinct oofamily, Subtiliolithidae, but numerous similarities to Laevisoolithus have led to their reclassification as Laevisoolithid eggs. A complete skeleton of Nanantius valifanovi was found associated with Subtiliolithus eggshells, indicating that the oogenus represents eggs of enantiornithine birds.
