= Frankie D. Jackson =

American paleobiologist

- Born: Alabama, U.S.
- Education: University of Montana (BA) Montana State University (PhD)
- Known for: Paleobiology; Oology; Macroevolution
- Scientific career
- Workplaces: Montana State University
- Doctoral advisor: David J. Varricchio

Frankie Jackson is an American academic whose career has focused on the evolution and fossil history of archosaur reproduction, particularly the study of fossil eggs. Her research on fossil eggs spans five continents, and has been foundational to our views of dinosaur nesting behavior.

== Early life and education ==
After moving to Montana, she studied geography at University of Montana and graduated with a Bachelor of Arts, with honors, following this with a PhD at Montana State University where she worked and taught for several decades. She was the first doctoral student granted a PhD in Earth Sciences at Montana State University.

== Career ==
=== Research ===
Jackson uses Scanning Electron Microscopy, histology, calculation of water vapor conductance rates, and other analytical techniques to identify eggshell and make paleoecological inferences. Her work has contributed to our understanding of theropod, sauropod, and turtle reproductive evolution.

A special focus has been the occurrence of pathologies and microbial infections in fossil eggs. Egg pathologies can be informative of the taphonomy of the eggshell, or the biology of the mother.

She has led important work on the reproductive behavior of living animals such as turtles and crocodylians

=== Public engagement ===
Jackson has used her dinosaur and avian reproductive research as the launching point for educational initiatives, including an NSF grant partnering undergraduate students with fossil egg researchers in China. She was featured in Luis Chiappe and Lowell Dingus' book about the discovery of sauropod nesting sites in Argentina, "Walking on Eggs".
