= Laevisoolithidae =

Laevisoolithidae Temporal range: Late Cretaceous

Egg fossil classification
- Basic shell type: Ornithoid
- Morphotype: Ornithoid-ratite
- Oofamily: †Laevisoolithidae; Mikhailov, 1991

Oogenera
- Laevisoolithus; Subtiliolithus; Tipoolithus

Laevisoolithidae is an oofamily of fossil eggs belonging to the Ornithoid-ratite morphotype. Their eggshells are smooth and very thin, typically less than a millimeter thick. Laevisoolithids may be the eggs of Enantiornithid birds. Eggs of the family were found in the Grès à Reptiles Formation of France and the Nemegt Formation of Mongolia.
