= Stromatoolithus =

Stromatoolithus Temporal range: Late Cretaceous (Cenomanian–Maastrichtian)

Egg fossil classification
- Basic shell type: †Dinosauroid-spherulitic
- Oogenus: †Stromatoolithus; Zhao et al., 1991

Oospecies
- S. albertensis Zelenitsky and Hills, 1997; S. europaeus Sellés et al., 2014; S. pinglingensis Zhao et al., 1991; S. porcarboris van der Linden et al., 2024

Synonyms
- S. albertensis: Spheroolithus albertensis Zelenitsky and Hills, 1997; S. europaeus: Spheroolithus europaeus Sellés et al., 2014; S. pinglingensis: Spheroolithus maiasauroides Mikhailov, 1994; S. porcarboris: Paraspheroolithus porcarboris van der Linden et al., 2024

Dinosaur ootaxon

Stromatoolithus is an oogenus of dinosaur egg known from the Late Cretaceous of what is now Asia, Europe, and North America. They were likely laid by hadrosauroid dinosaurs. The type oospecies is S. pinglingensis. Other species include S. porcarboris (formerly thought to be a oospecies of Paraspheroolithus), S. albertensis, and S. europaeus (both formerly thought to be oospecies of Spheroolithus).

== See also ==
- List of dinosaur oogenera
