= Apheloolithus =

Apheloolithus Temporal range: Maastrichtian ~72.1–66.0 Ma

Egg fossil classification
- Oofamily: incertae sedis
- Oogenus: †Apheloolithus

Oospecies
- †A. shuinanensis (type)

Oogenus of fossil eggs

Apheloolithus is an oogenus of fossil eggs from the Late Cretaceous Yuanpu and Pingling Formations of the Nanxiong Basin. Amateur paleontologist Donald Glut, in the appendix of his dinosaur encyclopedia, was unable to find the initial description of it, and speculated that it may not be a valid oogenus. Similarly, Molina-Perez and Larramendi listed Apheloolithus as a nomen nudum in their 2019 dinosaur encyclopedia.
