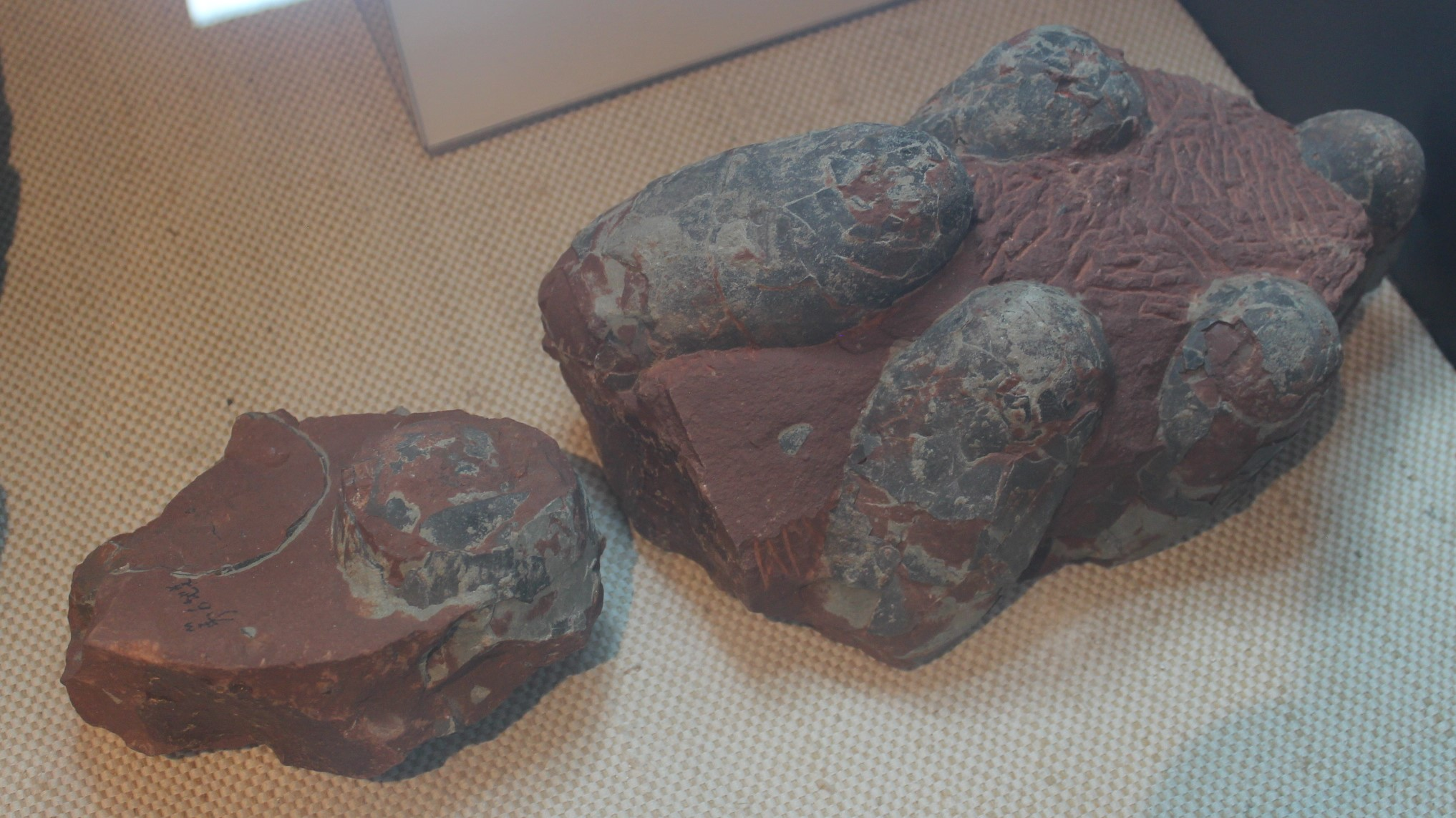
- Prismatoolithus tiantaiensis eggs, Paleozoological Museum of China

Egg fossil classification
- Basic shell type: †Dinosauroid-prismatic
- Oofamily: †Prismatoolithidae; Hirsch, 1994

Oogenera
- Preprismatoolithus; Prismatoolithus; Protoceratopsidovum; Sankofa; Spheruprismatoolithus; Trigonoolithus

= Prismatoolithidae =

Prismatoolithidae Temporal range: Late Cretaceous

Oofamily of fossil eggs

Prismatoolithidae is an oofamily of fossil eggs. They may have been laid by ornithopods or theropods.
