= Dinosaur reproduction =

Study of the reproduction of dinosaurs

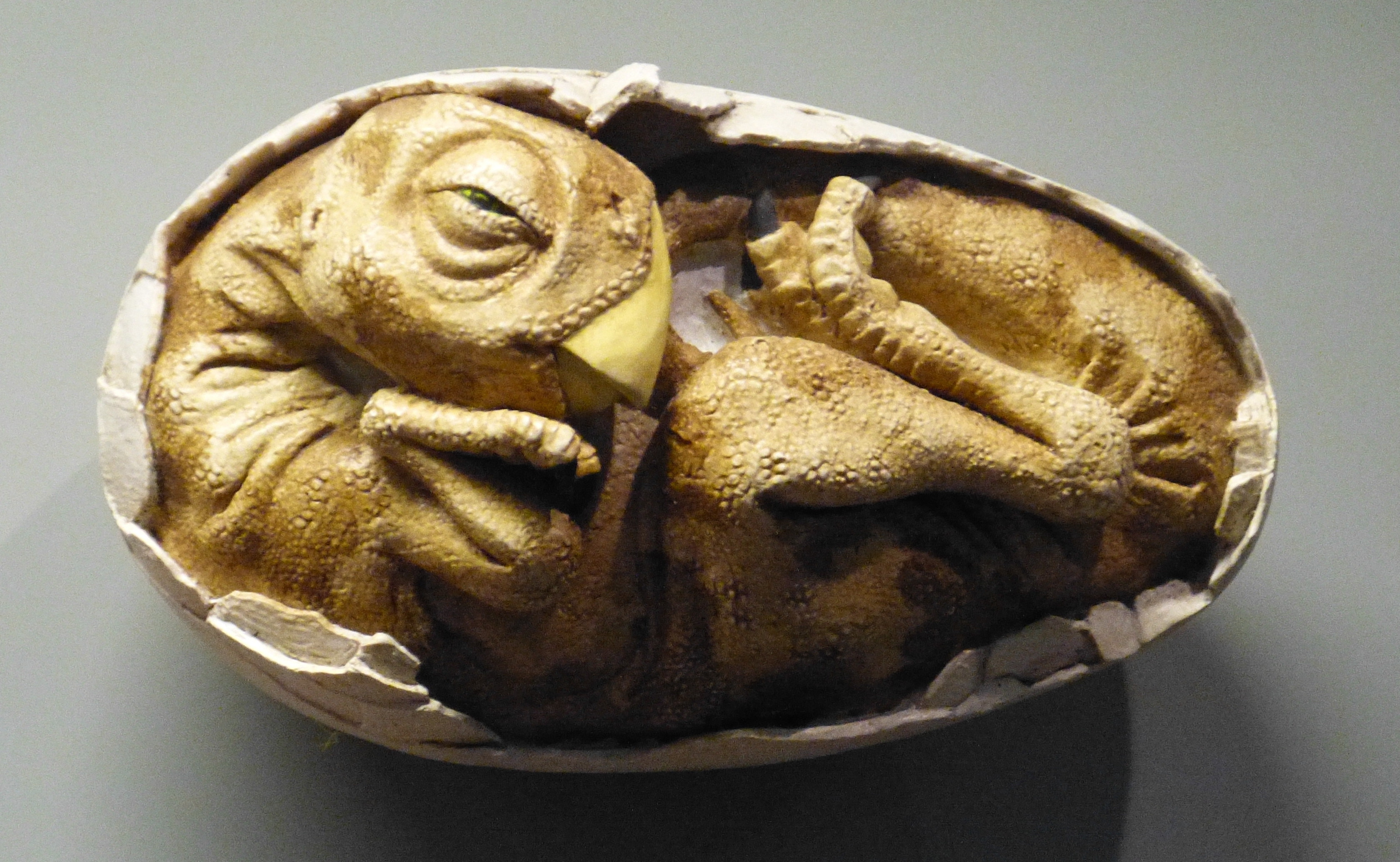
Model of a dinosaur egg

Dinosaur reproduction shows correlation with archosaur physiology, with newborns hatching from eggs that were laid in nests. Dinosaurs did not nurture their offspring as mammals typically do, and because dinosaurs did not nurse, it is likely that most dinosaurs were capable of surviving on their own after hatching. Although, parental care may have been required for some dinosaur species, as shown by fossil evidence. Dinosaur reproduction also required a mate; evidence of sexual dimorphism and courting displays have been found from fossil scrapings in sandstone and feathers on dinosaurs that lacked flight.

== Medullary bone ==
A discovery of features in a Tyrannosaurus rex skeleton provided more evidence that dinosaurs and birds evolved from a common ancestor and, for the first time, allowed paleontologists to establish the sex of a dinosaur. When laying eggs, female birds grow a special type of bone between the hard outer bone and the marrow of their limbs. This medullary bone, which is rich in calcium, is used to make eggshells. The presence of endosteally derived bone tissues lining the interior marrow cavities of portions of the Tyrannosaurus rex specimen's hind limb suggested that T. rex used similar reproductive strategies, and revealed the specimen to be female. Further research has found medullary bone in the theropod Allosaurus and the ornithopod Tenontosaurus. Because the line of dinosaurs that includes Allosaurus and Tyrannosaurus diverged from the line that led to Tenontosaurus very early in the evolution of dinosaurs, this suggests that dinosaurs in general produced medullary tissue. Medullary bone has been found in specimens of sub-adult size, which suggests that dinosaurs reached sexual maturity rather quickly for such large animals.

== Mating displays ==
=== Sexual dimorphism ===
Research and modern day birds suggest that dinosaurs had various methods of acquiring mates, ranging from biological traits such as sexual dimorphism, to mating displays such as dancing. Some dinosaurs, like Ornithomimids, had feathered arms resembling wings but their bodies were too heavy for flight. These wings were potentially used in mating displays, like some birds plumage does today. Older studies also suggest that dinosaurs like the Lambeosaurus may have used their specialized hollow horn structures to create vocalizations specific to mating. Both male and female fossils have been found, indicating these horn structures were not specific to one gender but these specialized hollow horns could have been brightly colored in order to distinguish males from females of the same species. Hesperosaurus fossils have potential sexual dimorphism in the shape of their back plates, with males having rounder and wider back plates while female's have taller more diamond shaped back plates. These plates may have displayed colors and been a sign of health in males, while female's plates acted as defense, like a cow's horns.

=== Mating behavior ===
Large scrapes in the sandstone of Colorado suggests that dinosaurs may have danced in order to impress a potential mate, a behavior seen in their successors, birds. The scrapings in the sandstone were interpreted to be evidence of mating displays areas or courtship sights, as there was no evidence of eggs in the area.

== Parental care ==
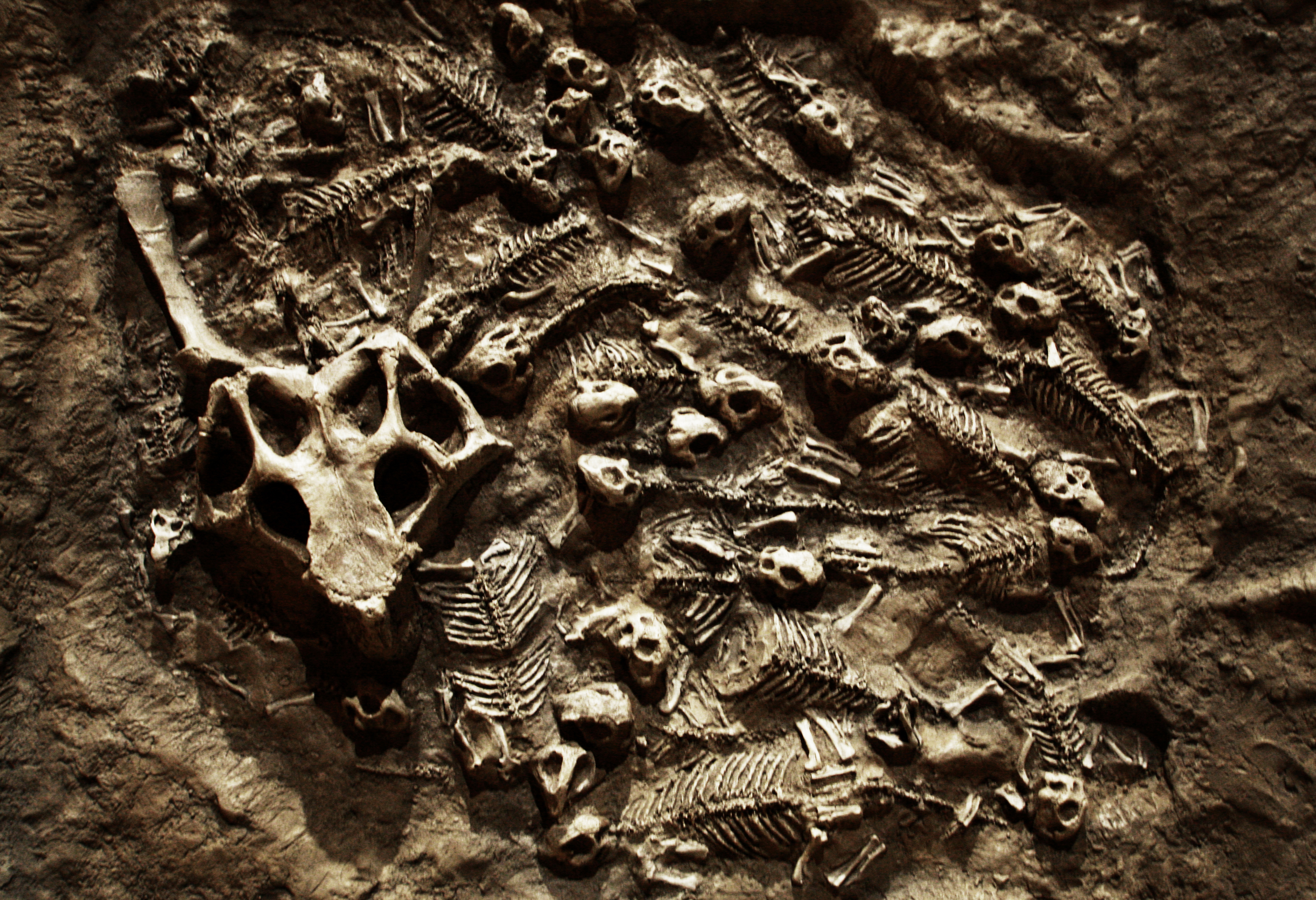
Psittacosaurus nest

Many dinosaurs fossils reflect instances of parental care and egg care. One fossil of the Pisttacosaurus sp. shows thirty-four juveniles of similar size buried along with an adult, a presumed care-taker. The bone development of the juveniles suggests a slow growth rate, and the overall amount of young found together indicates post-hatching growth that was dependent on extensive parental care. An assemblage of Protoceratops andrewsi juveniles were found of similar size and age, suggesting that they were from the same nest. These dinosaurs were found without the presence of egg shells in an oval-shaped nest, meaning that these animals grew together after hatching, potentially with some parental care.

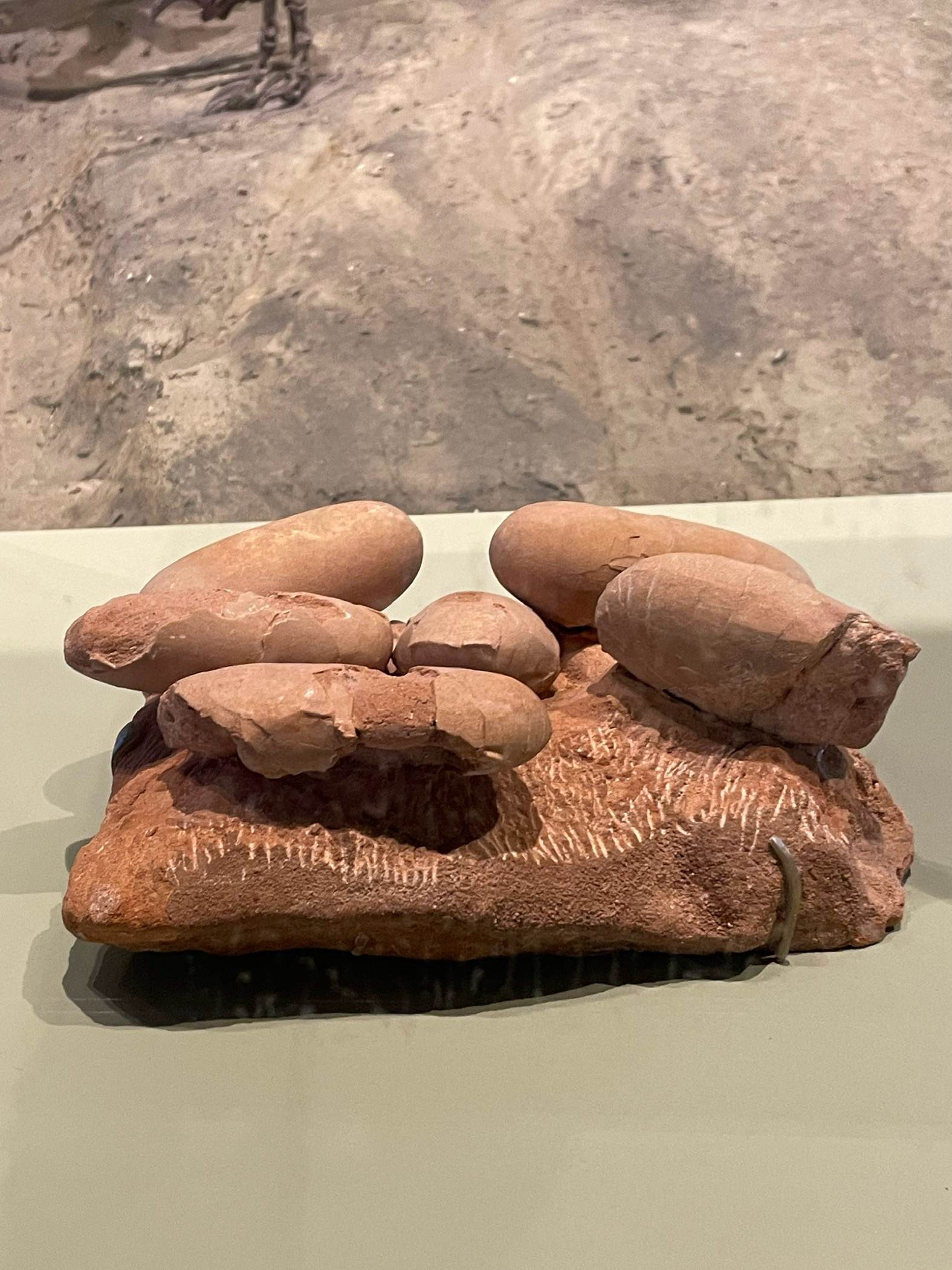
An Oviraptorosaurian nest, species unidentified

=== Nest building ===
Two main types of nest construction have been highlighted in fossils. Mound-nesting, as seen in modern archosaurs, were built-up nests made of mostly plant materials or soil. Eggs were then laid in the mound and covered to incubate through organic heat sources like decomposition of the plant material. These mound nests would allow the eggs to incubate without needing to be sat on and rotated. Mound-nesting was the only option for larger dinosaurs, like sauropods, that were unable to sit on their eggs to provide warmth. The eggs of hadrosaurs have been associated with fine-grain pedogenic sediments, where eggs were left to incubate via microbial respiration. Early dinosaur eggs also lacked color, suggesting that the eggs did not need to blend in with the environment to avoid predation, as they were hidden in mounds while incubation occurred. Other dinosaurs may have incubated their eggs using their body heat and feathers, like oviraptors and troodontids which have been documented sitting over their eggs in semi-open nests that were at least partly exposed during incubation.

== Ornithopod reproduction ==
=== Hadrosaur reproduction ===
==== In the Dinosaur Park Formation ====
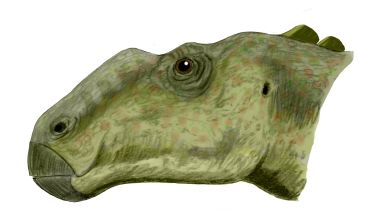
The head of Gryposaurus notabilis.

In a 2001 review of hadrosaur eggshell and hatchling material from Alberta's Dinosaur Park Formation, Darren Tanke and M. K. Brett-Surman concluded that hadrosaurs nested in both the ancient upland and lowlands of the formation's depositional environment. The upland nesting grounds may have been preferred by the less common hadrosaurs, like Brachylophosaurus or Parasaurolophus. However, the authors were unable to determine what specific factors shaped nesting ground choice in the formation's hadrosaurs. They suggested that behavior, diet, soil condition, and competition between dinosaur species all potentially influenced where hadrosaurs nested.

Sub-centimeter fragments of pebbly-textured hadrosaur eggshell have been reported from the Dinosaur Park Formation. This eggshell is similar to the hadrosaur eggshell of Devil's Coulee in southern Alberta as well as that of the Two Medicine and Judith River Formations in Montana, United States. While present, dinosaur eggshell is very rare in the Dinosaur Park Formation and is only found in two different microfossil sites. These sites are distinguished by large numbers of pisidiid clams and other less common shelled invertebrates like unionid clams and snails. This association is not a coincidence as the invertebrate shells would have slowly dissolved and released enough basic calcium carbonate to protect the eggshells from naturally occurring acids that otherwise would have dissolved them and prevented fossilization.

In contrast with eggshell fossils, the remains of very young hadrosaurs are actually somewhat common. Tanke has observed that an experienced collector could actually discover multiple juvenile hadrosaur specimens in a single day. The most common remains of young hadrosaurs in the Dinosaur Park Formation are dentaries, bones from limbs and feet, as well as vertebral centra. The material showed little or none of the abrasion that would have resulted from transport, meaning the fossils were buried near their point of origin. Bonebeds 23, 28, 47, and 50 are productive sources of young hadrosaur remains in the formation, especially bonebed 50. The bones of juvenile hadrosaurs and fossil eggshell fragments are not known to have preserved in association with each other, despite both being present in the formation.
