= Preprismatoolithus =

Preprismatoolithus Temporal range: Late Jurassic

Egg fossil classification
- Basic shell type: †Dinosauroid-prismatic
- Oofamily: †Prismatoolithidae
- Oogenus: †Preprismatoolithus; Zelenitsky & Hills, 1996

Trace fossil

Preprismatoolithus is a Late Jurassic oogenus. The species P. coloradensis is described by John Foster as being "of the prismatic basic type," with subspherical eggs about 10 cm (4 inches) in diameter. This oospecies was first attributed to "hypsilophodontid" dinosaurs, although an initial lack of associated embryo material made confirming the egg-layer's identity impossible. After a finding in Portugal associated prismatic basic types with embryos, it now is known to be theropod.

Eggshell present in great abundance at the so-called "Young Egg Locality" which seems to have been a dinosaur nesting ground. Congeneric eggshell fossils are found at additional Colorado sites including the Fruita Paleontological Area, the Uravan Locality and Garden Park.

== See also ==
- Dinosaurs of the Morrison Formation
