= Protoceratopsidovum =

Protoceratopsidovum Temporal range: Campanian ~84–72 Ma

Egg fossil classification
- Basic shell type: †Dinosauroid-prismatic
- Oofamily: †Prismatoolithidae
- Oogenus: †Protoceratopsidovum; Mikhailov, 1994

Oospecies
- †P. sincerum Mikhailov, 1994 (type); †P. minimum Mikhailov, 1994; †P. fluxuosum Mikhailov, 1994

Dinosaur egg

Protoceratopsidovum is an oogenus of dinosaur egg from Mongolia. Despite its name (which means "eggs of Protoceratops"), it does not represent the eggs of a protoceratopsid, but rather the eggs of maniraptoran theropods.

== Description ==
Protoceratopsidovum eggs are extremely abundant in the Djadokhta and Barun Goyot Formations. P. sincerum and P. minimum eggs both have a smooth surface, whereas those of P. fluxuosum have fine ornamentation around the equatorial part. The eggs are elongated and asymmetrical, with a two-layered prismatic shell generally resembling the eggs of Troodon. They were laid in pairs.

== Parataxonomy ==
The eggs of Protoceratopsidovum are classified in the oofamily Prismatoolithidae. They were originally thought to be eggs of Protoceratops (hence the name) because they are extremely common at the same sites as Protoceratops. However, more recent research has cast doubt on this: a cladistic analysis in 2008, by Zelenitsky and Therrien, found them to be the eggs of maniraptorans.

== Palaeobiology ==
The shape, structure, and arrangement of eggs of Protoceratopsidovum and its relatives provide some insight into the palaeobiology of fossil eggs. Their asymmetrical shape (resembling bird eggs) suggests that the process of egg formation was similar to that of birds. Unlike bird eggs (which are laid one at a time), Protoceratopsidovum eggs were laid in pairs because the mother would have two functioning oviducts which would both lay a single egg simultaneously, contrasting with modern birds, which have only one functional oviduct. Though no fossils of parents incubating Protoceratopsidovum eggs have been found, their identification as maniraptoran eggs would imply that they were incubated.

== See also ==
- List of dinosaur oogenera
