= Laevisoolithus =

Laevisoolithus Temporal range: Maastrichtian ~70–66 Ma

Egg fossil classification
- Basic shell type: Ornithoid
- Morphotype: Ornithoid-ratite
- Oofamily: †Laevisoolithidae
- Oogenus: †Laevisoolithus; Mikhailov, 1991

Laevisoolithus is an oogenus of fossil egg. Its sole oospecies, L. sochavai, is native to the Nemegt Formation in Mongolia. Laevisoolithus is characterized by its thin, smooth eggshells. These eggs were probably laid by a bird or a small theropod.
