= Montanoolithus =

Montanoolithus Temporal range: Late Cretaceous

Egg fossil classification
- Basic shell type: Ornithoid
- Morphotype: Ornithoid-ratite
- Oofamily: †Montanoolithidae; Zelenitsky and Therrien, 2008
- Oogenus: †Montanoolithus; Zelenitsky and Therrien, 2008

Oospecies
- †M. strongorum Zelenitsky and Therrien, (2008) (type)

Montanoolithus is an oogenus of fossil egg found in Montana and Alberta. They were probably laid by a dromaeosaur or a caenagnathid.

== Distribution ==
The type specimen of Montanoolithus was found in the Two Medicine Formation on the Blackfeet Reservation. Other specimens are known from the Oldman Formation in Alberta. All Montanoolithus fossils yet discovered date to the Late Cretaceous.

== Description ==
Montanoolithus strongorum is known from several eggshell fragments and a partial egg clutch (with five preserved eggs). When complete, this clutch likely had at least twelve eggs, arrayed in pairs in a ring, similar to the Asian oviraptorid clutches. The most complete egg is elongated, measuring 125 mm (4.9 in) long by 60 mm (2.4 in) wide, and slightly asymmetrical. The outer surface of its shell is ornamented with anastomosing ridges.

Montanoolithus's eggshell ranges from 0.70 to 0.85 mm thick, and is composed of two layers. The outer layer, called the columnar layer (or squamatic zone, so named because of the peculiar texture of the layer), is twice as thick as the inner mammillary layer. The two layers are divided by a gradual boundary. The mammillae (the cone-shaped structures in the mammillary layer which make up the base of each eggshell unit) are formed by wedge-shaped crystals.

== Palaeobiology ==
Cladistic analysis shows Montanoolithus to be maniraptoran eggs, more basal than troodontids, but more derived than oviraptorids. Maniraptorans are only represented at the Two Medicine formation by Troodon (whose eggs are already known), dromaeosaurs, and caenagnathids. Therefore, the parent of Montanoolithus was probably a dromaeosaur or a caenagnathid.

The mother of the Montanoolithus eggs made a mound-shaped nest out of sand, and laid the eggs in a ring around the top. The nest was made from freshly deposited sand (perhaps near to a river), or in a poorly vegetated area. Even though no parent was found with the eggs, it is likely based on its identification as a maniraptoran that the eggs were incubated, since this behavior has been observed in both troodontids and oviraptorids. The pairing of the eggs suggests that, like other maniraptorans, the egg-layer of Montanoolithus had two functioning oviducts which would each form an egg simultaneously.

== Parataxonomy ==
Montanoolithus is classified in its own oofamily, Montanoolithidae, which is related to the eggs of oviraptorids, troodontids, and birds. It contains a single oospecies: M. strongorum.
