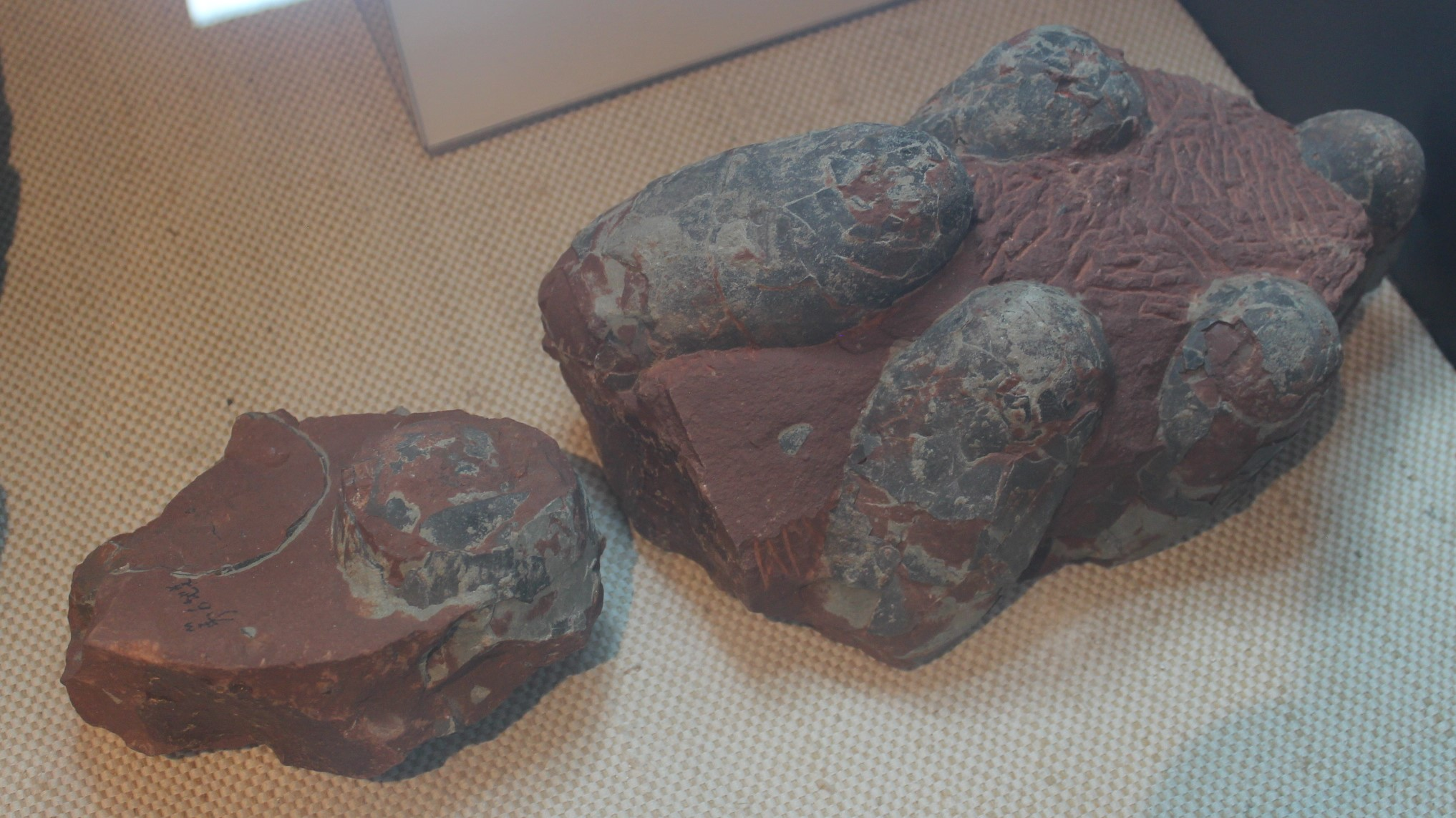
- Prismatoolithus tiantaiensis eggs, Paleozoological Museum of China

Egg fossil classification
- Basic shell type: †Dinosauroid-prismatic
- Oofamily: †Prismatoolithidae
- Oogenus: †Prismatoolithus

Oospecies
- P. caboti; P. gebiensis; P. hanshuiensis; P. heyuanensis; P. hirschi; P. hukouensis; P. ilekensis; P. jenseni; P. levis; P. matellensis; P. tenuis; P. tiantaiensis; P. trempii

= Prismatoolithus =

Prismatoolithus Temporal range: Hauterivian-Maastrichtian ~130–66 Ma

Dinosaur egg

Prismatoolithus is an oogenus of dinosaur egg from the Cretaceous (Hauterivian-Maastrichtian) and possibly also the earliest Paleocene. They likely belonged to troodontids.
