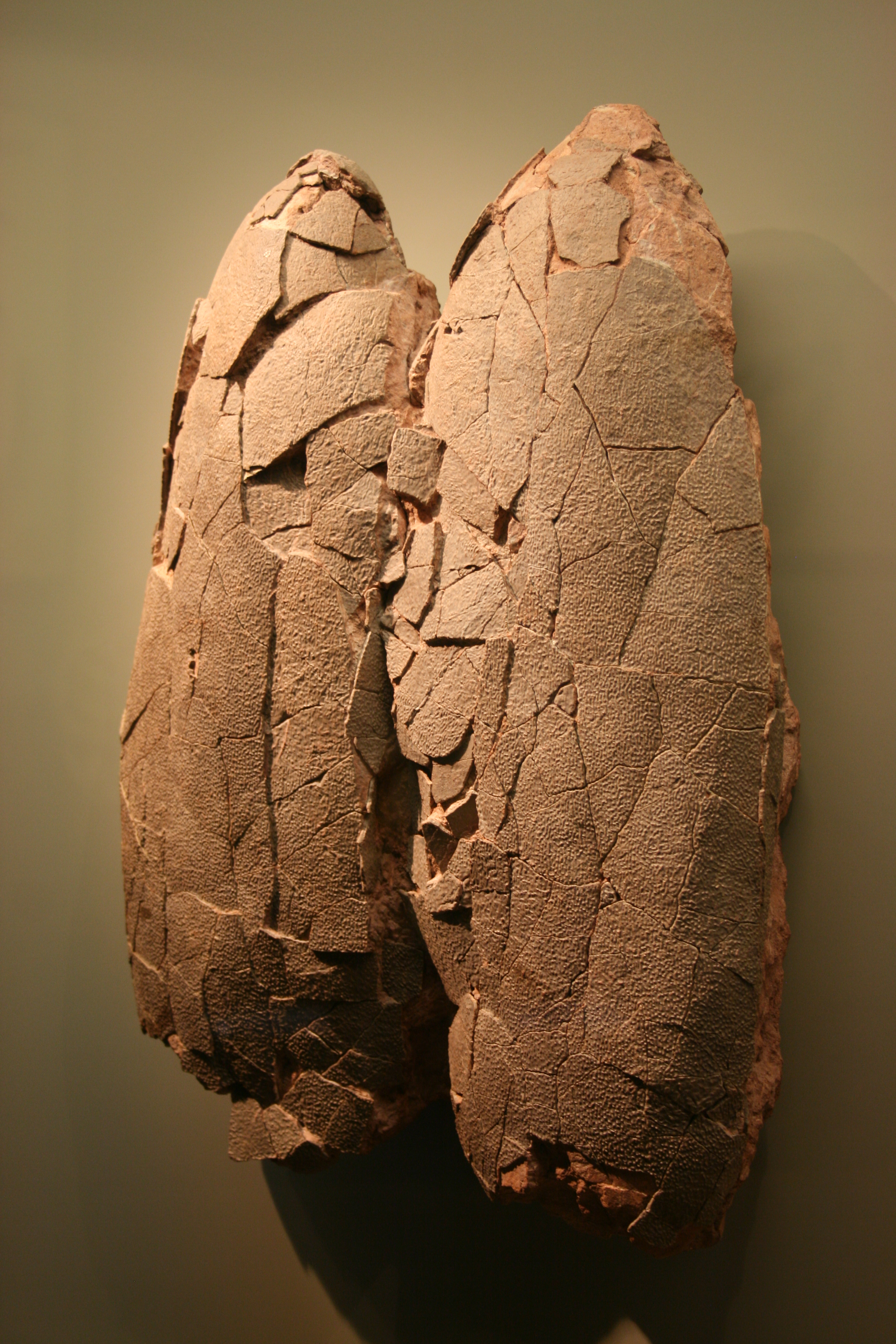
- Macroelongatoolithus eggs in the Naturhistorisches Museum Wien

Egg fossil classification
- Basic shell type: Ornithoid
- Morphotype: Ornithoid-ratite
- Oofamily: †Elongatoolithidae
- Oogenus: †Macroelongatoolithus; Li et al., 1995

Synonyms
- Oogenus synonymy: Boletuoolithus Bray, 1998; Longiteresoolithus Wang and Zhou, 1995; Megafusoolithus Wang et al, 2010; Oospecies synonymy: Oolithes carlylensis Jensen, 1970; Megafusoolithus qiaoxiaensis Wang et al, 2010; Longiteresoolithus xixiaensis Wang and Zhou, 1995; Macroelongatoolithus xixiaensis Li et al, 1995; Macroelongatoolithus zhangi Fang et al, 2000; Macroelongatoolithus goseongensis Kim et al, 2011

= Macroelongatoolithus =

Macroelongatoolithus Temporal range: Cretaceous, 145–66 Ma

Oogenus of dinosaur egg

Macroelongatoolithus is an oogenus of large theropod dinosaur eggs, representing the eggs of giant caenagnathid oviraptorosaurs. They are known from Asia and from North America. Historically, several oospecies have been assigned to Macroelongatoolithus, however they are all now considered to be a single oospecies: M. carlylensis.

== History of discovery ==
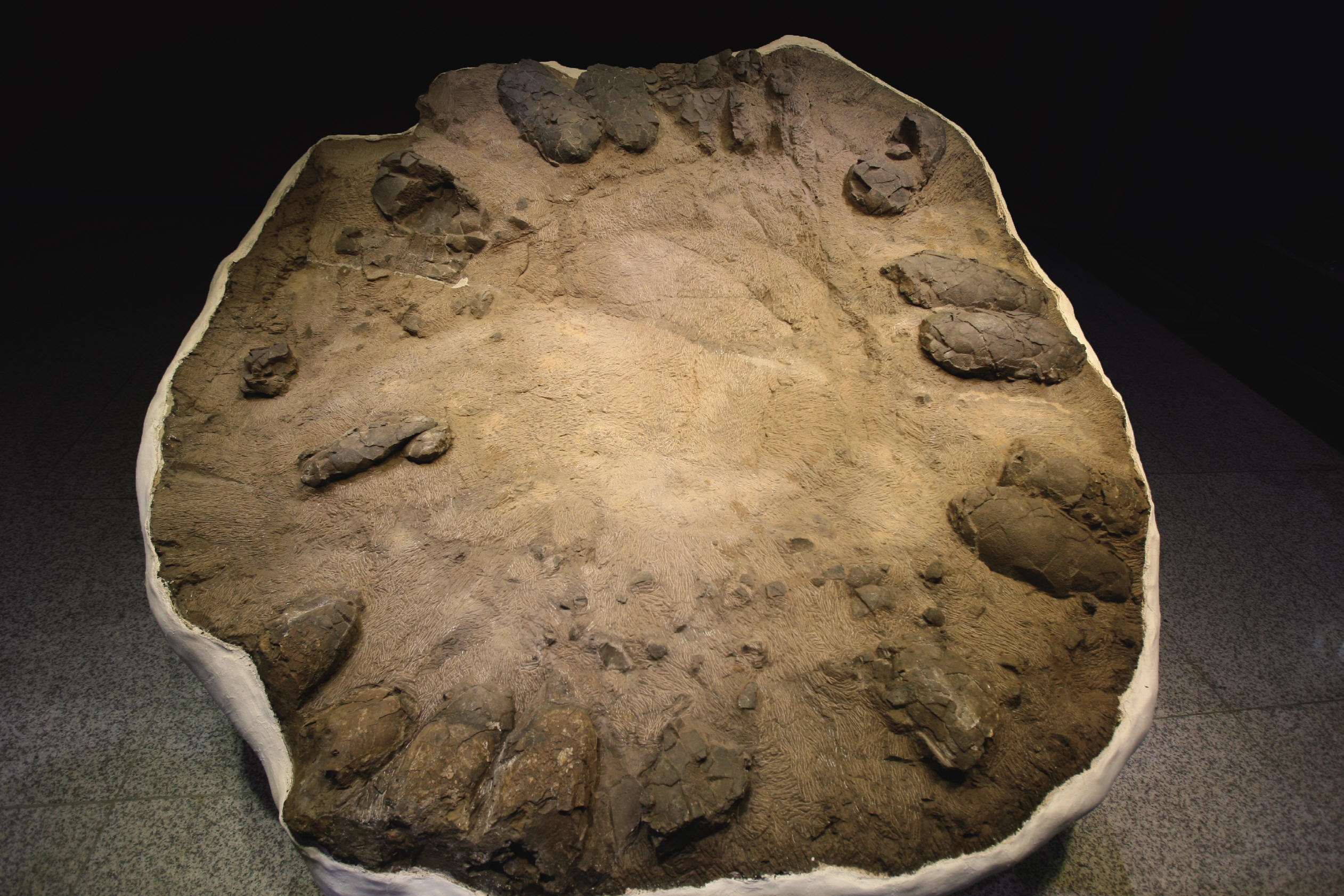
Macroelongatoolithus nest (MNHM-nat201153) from Aphaedo Island, South Korea

"Oolithes" carlylensis was described in 1970 by James Jensen. In 1998, O. carlylensis was moved to a new oogenus, Boletuoolithus, which was then classified as a Spheroolithid. Macroelongatoolithus was first described in 1995 by Li et al., with a single oospecies: M. xixiaensis. It was classified in the oofamily Elongatoolithidae. Later in the same year, Wang and Zhou described Longiteresoolithus xixiaensis, which they placed into a new oofamily, Macroelongatoolithidae. These three oospecies are now considered synonymous, and generally classified in Elongatoolithidae. Since M. carlylensis was named first, it has priority, but the name was corrected to M. carlylei to follow ICZN provisions.

== Description ==
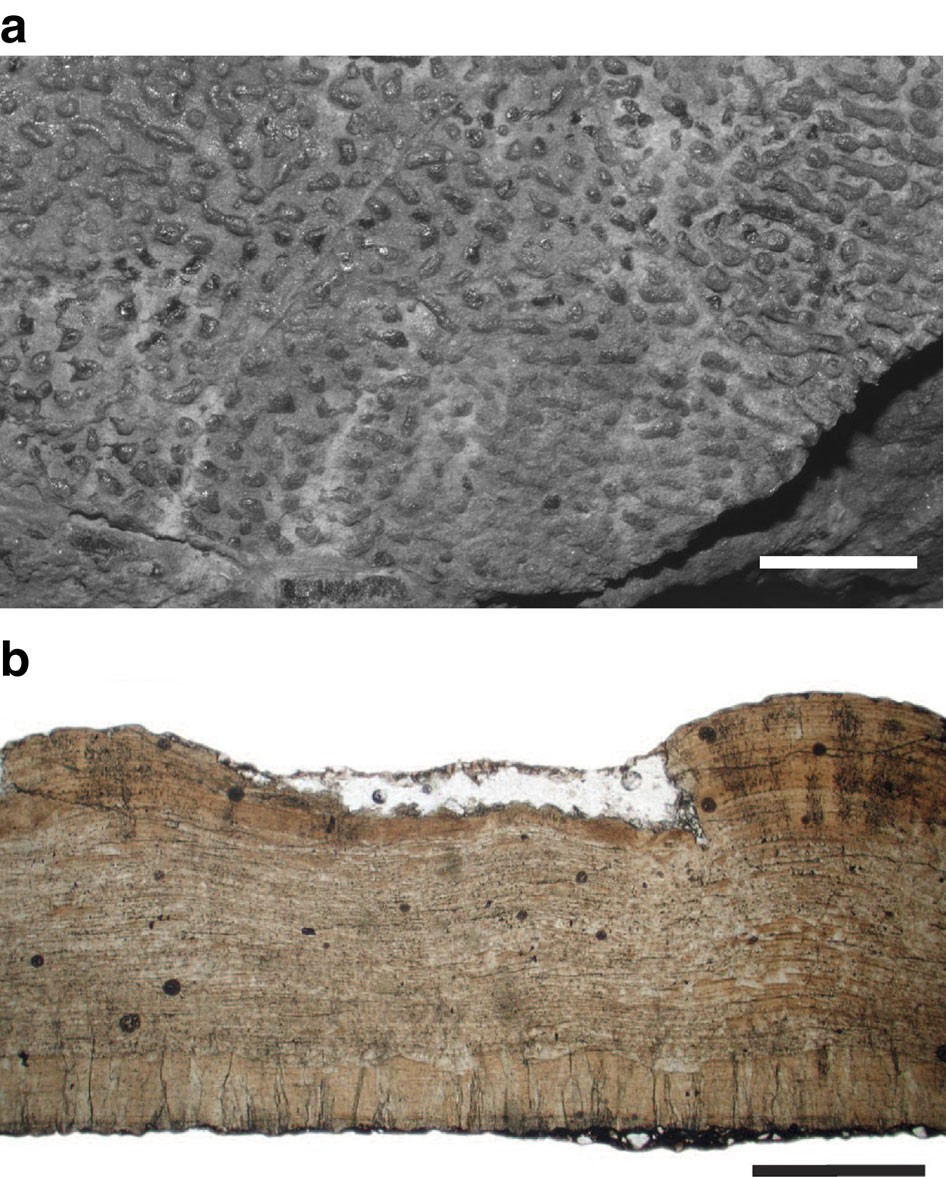
Eggshell surface (a) and microstructure (b) of Macroelongatoolithus eggs associated with Beibeilong

Macroelongatoolithus eggs are most notable for their large size. They are at least 34 centimetres (13 in) long, but the largest specimens are over 60 centimetres (24 in) long. They are also very elongated, usually roughly three times longer than they are wide. They are often found in large clutches of up to 26 eggs, with the eggs forming a ring 2–3.3 metres (6.6–10.8 ft) in diameter. The shell is typically between 1.38 mm and 4.75 mm thick.

Like other elongatoolithids, Macroelongatoolithus's eggshell is divided up into two structural layers, and the outer layer (called the continuous layer) is not divided up into distinct shell units, unlike other oofamilies. In Macroelongatoolithus, the boundary between the continuous layer and the mammillary layer (the inner layer of the eggshell, also called the cone layer) is wavy, but clearly defined. The ratio of the thickness of the two layers varies from 2:1 to 8:1.

The surface ornamentation of the eggshells is variable, even on a single egg. It is usually lineartuberculate (nodes forming linear ridges), ramotuberculate (nodes forming irregular, meandering chains), or dispersituberculate (scattered nodes).

Macroelongatoolithus specimens are extremely variable in size, shape, and microstructure, even in eggs laid by a single individual. For example, within a single clutch, the egg lengths can vary by several centimeters. The high amount of variability is probably due to their large size.

== Classification ==
Macroelongatoolithus has a convoluted parataxonomic history. Several oospecies have been described, but currently they are all considered synonyms of M. carlylei. While it is occasionally classified into a separate oofamily, Macroelongatoolithidae, the general consensus is that it is a member of Elongatoolithidae. Two other oospecies have also been described: M. zhangi and M. goseongensis, but both are now considered synonymous with M. carlylensis. The oogenus and oospecies Megafusoolithus qiaoxiaensis is also a junior synonym of Macroelongatoolithus carlylei.

== Paleobiology ==
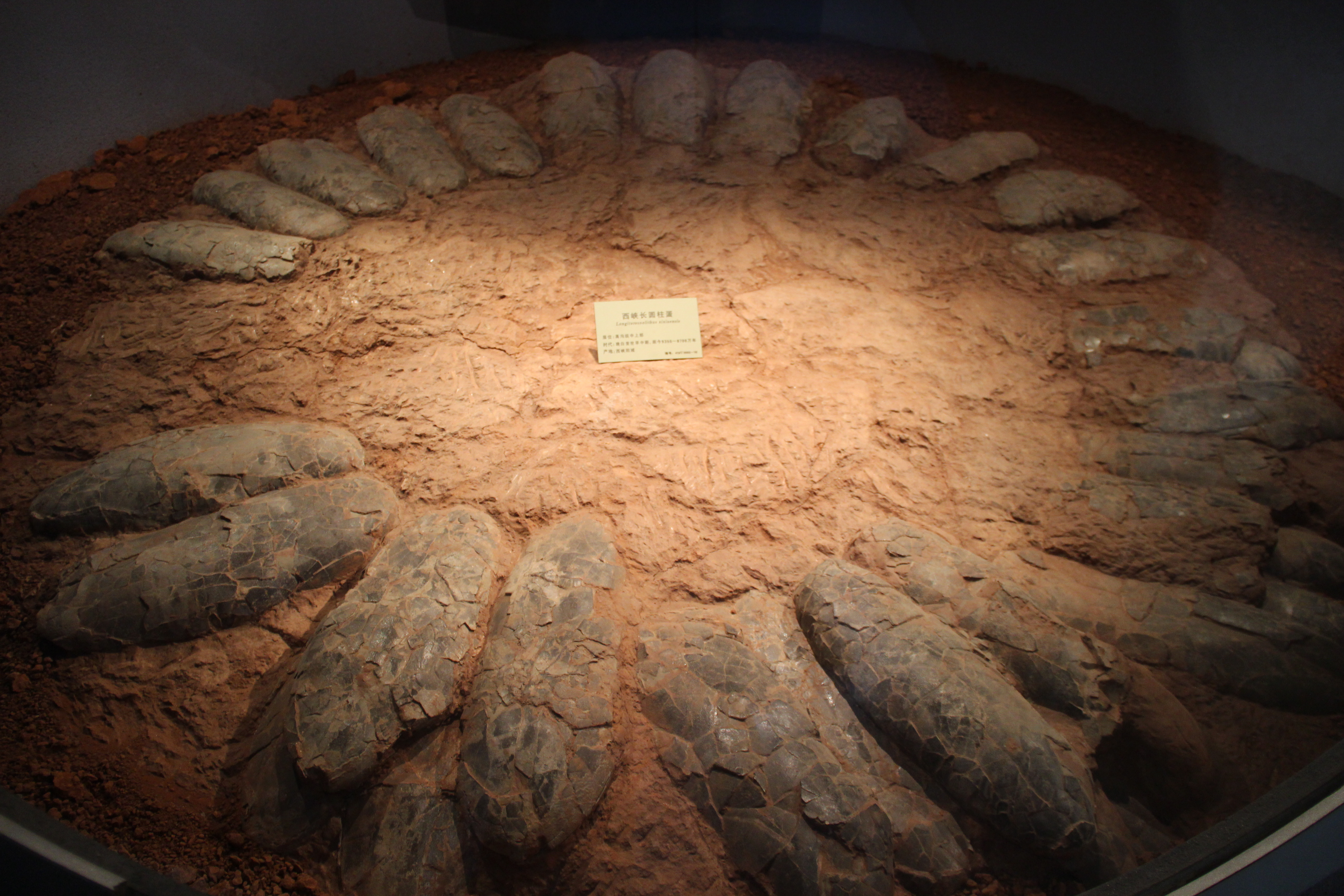
Macroelongatoolithus (41HV003-16) nest with eggs

While they were once considered to be the eggs of large tyrannosaurids (like Tarbosaurus) on the basis of their huge size, egg shape and microstructural evidence suggests they are eggs of gigantic oviraptorosaurs (like Beibeilong or Gigantoraptor). Macroelongatoolithus eggs closely resemble those of oviraptorosaurs (Elongatoolithidae), which are largely known for their brooding adult-nest associations, embryonic remains, and unique nests. In 2017 the caenagnathid Beibeilong was described, based on an embryonic specimen (named "Baby Louie") associated with 6 to 8 Macroelongatoolithus eggs and partial nest. The discovery of Beibeilong further concludes that the oogenus Macroelongatoolithus was laid by large oviraptorosaurs, in this case caenagnathids.

The gas conductance of the eggshells indicate that Macroelongatoolithus nests were buried in vegetation or sediments. Like other elongatoolithids, Macroelongatoolithus eggs are laid in pairs because the parents had two functional oviducts and thus laid two eggs simultaneously. The nests have unusually large volume of eggs compared to the body size of the parents, which could mean that multiple females would contribute to a single nest. Association of other oviraptorids with their eggs suggests extensive parental care was typical for elongatoolithids.

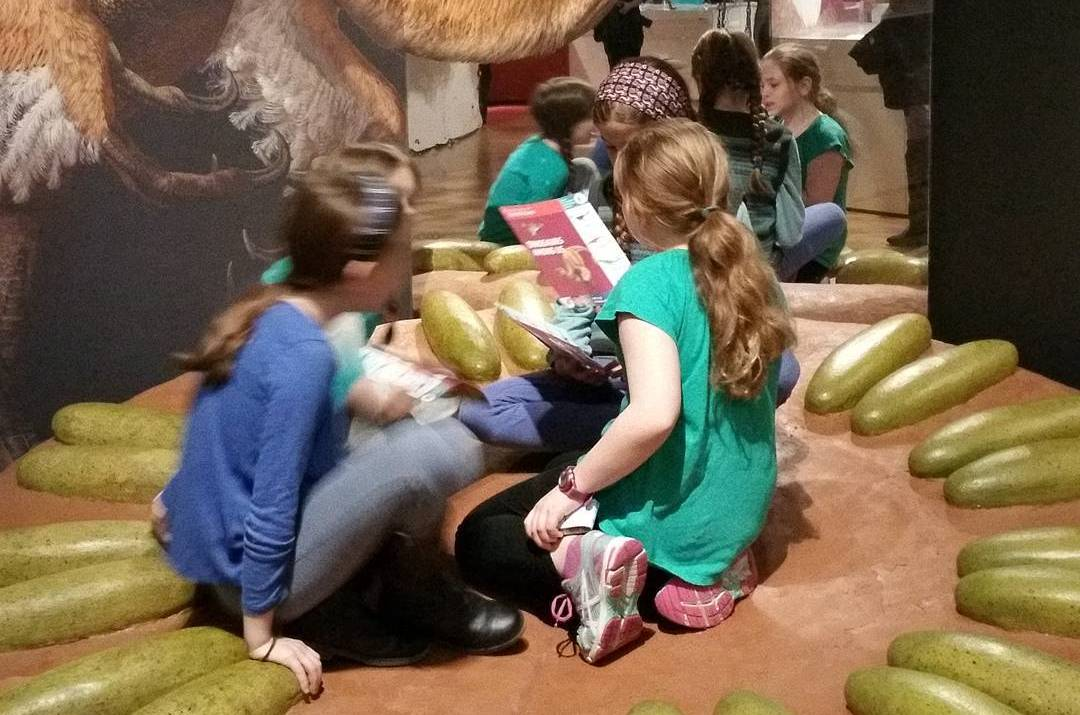
Reconstructed Gigantoraptor nest, American Museum of Natural History

In 2018, Kohei Tanaka and team examined the egg clutches of numerous oviraptorosaur specimens, including egg clutches of Macroelongatoolithus, in order to correlate the nest configuration and body size to incubation behaviour. Their results showed that eggshell porosity indicates that the eggs of almost certainly all oviraptorosaurs were exposed in the nest without an external covering. Though most oviraptorosaur nests have eggs arranged in a circular fashion, the morphology of the nest is different in smaller and larger species in that the center of the nest is highly reduced in the former species, and becomes significantly larger in the latter species. This nest configuration suggest that whereas smallest oviraptorosaurs probably sat directly on the eggs, a large, Gigantoraptor-sized animal likely sat on the area devoid of eggs. Tanaka and colleagues pointed out that this adaption was beneficial to avoid egg-crushing and could have allowed some body-contact during incubation in these giant oviraptorosaurs.

== Paleoecology ==
=== Distribution ===
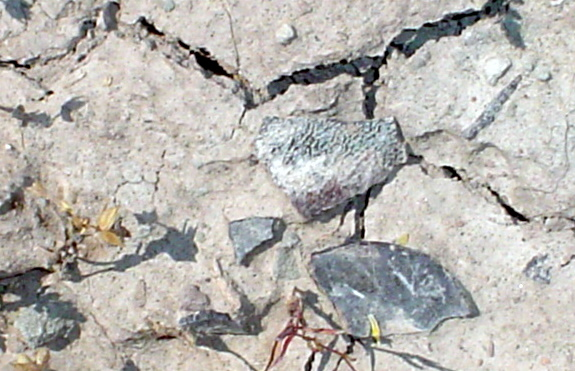
Macroelongatoolithus eggshell fragments in the Wayan Formation of Idaho

Macroelongatoolithus eggs have been found in the United States, China, and South Korea, ranging in age from Early Cretaceous to Maastrichtian. More specifically, it is known in North America from the Cedar Mountain, Dakota, Kelvin, and Naturita Formations of Utah, the Wayan Formation of Idaho, the Blackleaf Formation of Montana, the Thomas Fork Formation of Wyoming, and the Willow Tank Formation of Nevada. In China, it is known from the Liangtoutang and Chichengshan Formations in Tiantai County, Zhejiang Province, from the Gaogou, Sigou, Majiacun, and Zoumagang Formations in Henan Province, China. It is known in South Korea from the Goseong Formation near Tongyeong and from the Ilseongsan Formation, Sinan, South Korea.

The presence of Macroelongatoolithus in the United States indicates that there was likely a giant oviraptorosaur present during the Late Cretaceous in North America. Also, the fact that they have been found in both Asia and North America is evidence of an Albian-Cenomanian interchange of fauna between the two continents.

== See also ==
- List of dinosaur oogenera
- Elephant bird, the avian dinosaur that laid the largest egg.
