= List of stratigraphic units with dinosaur trace fossils =

This is a list of stratigraphic units dinosaur trace fossils have been recovered from. Although Dinosauria is a clade which includes the descendant taxon Aves (modern birds), this article covers only stratigraphic units containing Mesozoic forms. Units listed are all either formation rank or higher (e.g. group).

== Coprolites ==
Name	Age	Country	Province/State	Description
Aguja Formation	Campanian	Mexico; United States	Chihuahua; Texas	
Blesa Formation	Early Cretaceous	Spain	Teruel	
Cerroa del Pueblo Formation	Late Cretaceous	Mexico	Coahuila	
Dinosaur Park Formation	Late Campanian	Canada	Alberta	
Frenchman Formation	Late Maastrichtian	Canada	Saskatchewan	
Portland Formation	Pliensbachian to Toarcian	United States	Connecticut; Massachusetts	
Sânpetru Formation	Late Maastrichtian	Romania	Brasov județ	
Wealden Group	Early Cretaceous	United Kingdom	England	
Whitemud Formation	Maastrichtian	Canada	Alberta	

== Eggs or nests ==
Name	Age	Country	Province/State	Description
Allen Formation	Middle Campanian	Argentina	Mendoza; Neuquén; Río Negro	
Allison Formation		Canada	Alberta	
Anacleto Formation		Argentina	Mendoza; Neuquén; Río Negro; Buenos Aires	
Angostura Colorada Formation				
Ankarafantsika Formation		Madagascar	Mahajanga	
Aréen Formation	Late Cretaceous	Spain	Huesca	
Asencio Formation				
Bagua Formation				
Bajo de la Carpa Formation		Argentina	Neuquén; Río Negro	
Barun Goyot Formation	Middle Campanian (?)	Mongolia	Ömnögovi Province	has a few alternate spellings
Bayan Shireh Formation	Cenomanian to Santonian	Mongolia		has many alternate spellings
Blesa Formation	Early Cretaceous	Spain	Teruel; La Rioja	
Calizus de Lychnus Formation				
Camadas de Alcobaça	Kimmeridgian	Portugal		
Camadas de Guimarota	Late Jurassic	Portugal		
Camadas de Montejunto		Portugal		
Camarillas Formation		Spain	Teruel; La Rioja	
Castellar Formation		Spain	Teruel; La Rioja	
Cedar Mountain Formation	Barremian to basal Cenomanian	United States	Utah	
Colorado Formation		Argentina		
Dakota Formation		United States	Nebraska	
Dinosaur Park Formation	Late Campanian	Canada	Alberta	
Djadochta Formation	Middle Campanian	Mongolia		has many alternate spellings
Doshuul Formation				
El Gallo Formation		Mexico	Baja California	
Fruitland Formation		United States	Colorado; New Mexico	
Gaogou Formation		China	Henan	
Gres d'Alet Formation				
Hasandong Formation		Republic of Korea		
Ialovachsk Formation				
Intertrappean Beds		India	Andhra Pradesh	
Iren Dabasu Formation	?Campanian	China	Inner Mongolia	
Jindong Formation		China	Zhejiang	
Kaiparowits Formation	Late Campanian	United States	Utah	
Kallanakurichi Formation		India	Tamil Nadu	
Khodzhaosmansk Formation		Kyrgyzstan		
Kitadani Formation	Aptian to Albian	Japan	Chūbu-chihō	
Laguna Colorada Formation	?Norian	Argentina	Santa Cruz	
Lameta Formation		India	Gujarat; Madhya Pradesh; Maharashtra	
Los Alamitos Formation		Argentina	Río Negro Province	
Los Blanquitos Formation		Argentina	Salta	
Manrakskaya Svita				
Marilia Formation		Brazil	Minas Gerais	
Marnes rouges de Roquelongue Formation		France	Aude	
Marnes Rouges Inferieures Formation		France	Aude	
Majiacun Formation				
Meeteetse Formation		United States	Wyoming	
Mercedes Formation		Uruguay		
Mooreville Chalk Formation	Early Maastrichtian	United States	Alabama; Mississippi	
Morrison Formation	Time	United States	Colorado; Wyoming	
Nanchao Formation		China	Henan	
Nichkesaisk Formation				
Oxford Clay	Callovian	United Kingdom	England	
Patcham Formation		United Kingdom	England	
Purbeck Beds	Berriasian	United Kingdom	England	
Quantou Formation		China	Jilin	
Quxian Formation		China	Sichuan	
Rio Colorado Formation		Argentina	Neuquén; Río Negro Province	
Sainshand Svita		Mongolia	Dornogovi Province	
St. Mary River Formation		Canada	Alberta	
Sangping Formation		China	Henan	
Seonso Conglomerate Formation		Republic of Korea		
Shanyang Formation		China	Shaanxi	
Sigou Formation		China	Sichuan	
Solnhofen limestone	Kimmeridgian	Germany	Bavaria	
Stonesfield Slate		United Kingdom	England	
Subashi Formation		China	Xinjiang	
Takli Formation		South Africa		
Tangshang Formation		China	Hebei	
Tendaguru Formation	Kimmeridgian	Tanzania		
Thomas Fork Formation		United States	Idaho	
Tremp Formation		Spain	Huesca	Many in situ nesting sites of sauropods, designated UNESCO Global Geopark in 2018
Two Medicine Formation	?Late Santonian to Late Campanian	United States	Montana	
Villalba de la Sierra Formation				
Vilquechico Formation		Peru		
Wahweap Formation		United States	Arizona; Utah	
Wangshi Group		China	Shandong	
Wayan Formation		United States	Idaho	
Wessex Formation	Barremian	United Kingdom	England	
Willow Creek Formation		Canada	Alberta	
Yixian Formation	Barremian	China	Liaoning	
Yuanpu Formation		China	Guangdong	
Zhaoyin Formation				
Zhoutian Formation	Turonian–early Coniacian	China	Jiangxi	
Zoumagang Formation		China	Henan	

== See also ==
- List of dinosaur-bearing rock formations

== Sources ==
- Weishampel, David B.; Dodson, Peter; and Osmólska, Halszka (eds.): The Dinosauria, 2nd, Berkeley: University of California Press. 861 pp; ISBN 0-520-24209-2.
