= Gaogou Formation =

Geological formation in China

- Stratigraphic range: Cenomanian-Coniacian; ~96–88 Ma
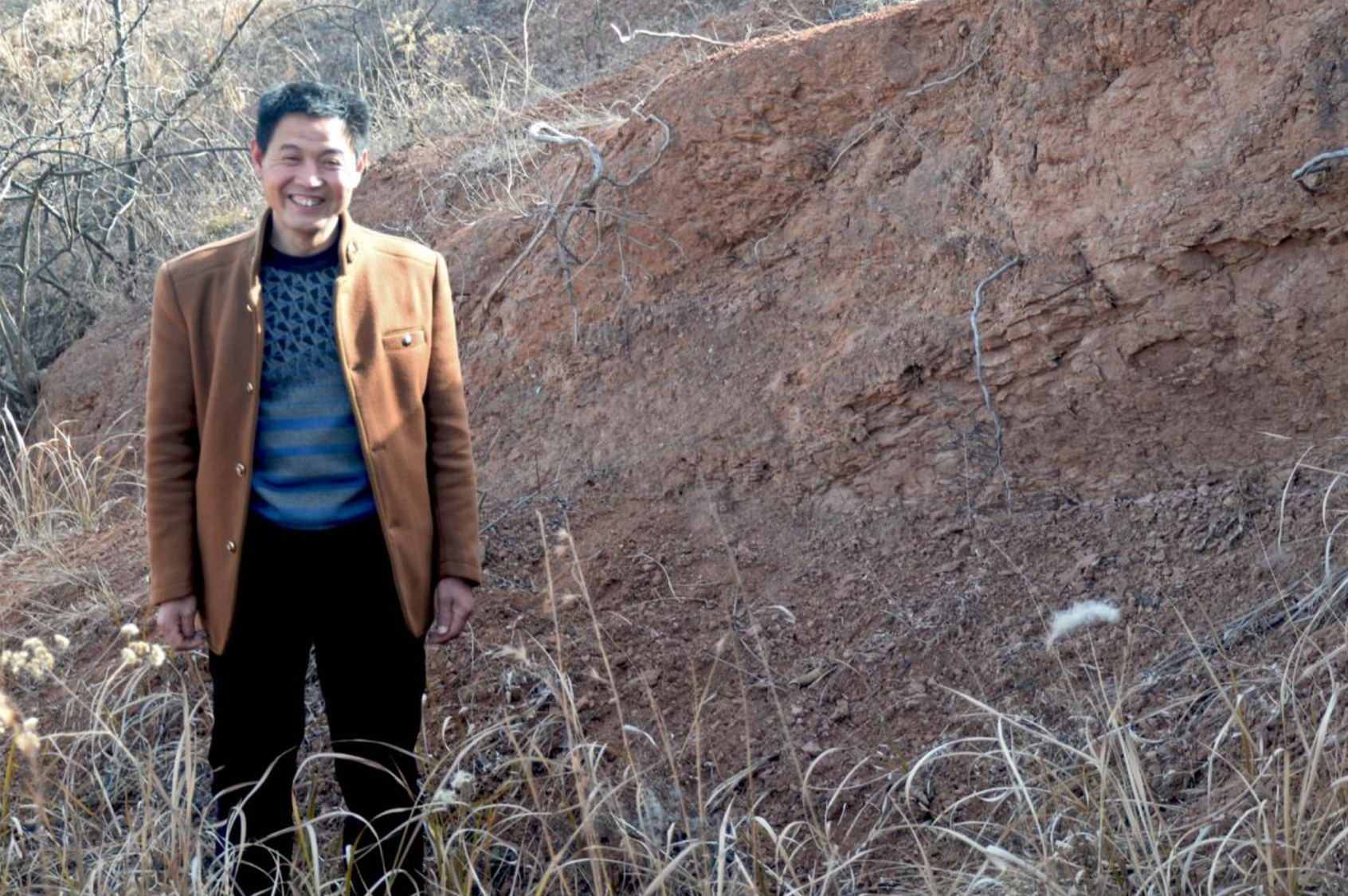
- Zhang Fengchen at the Gaogou Formation
- Type: Geological formation
- Sub-units: Upper Member, Lower Member
- Underlies: Majiacun Formation
- Overlies: Baiwan Formation

Lithology
- Primary: Conglomerate
- Other: Mudstone

Location
- Coordinates: 33.4°N 112.9°E
- Approximate paleocoordinates: 32.7°N 104.7°E
- Region: Henan Province
- Country: China
- Extent: Xixia Basin
- Gaogou Formation (China) Gaogou Formation (Henan)

The Gaogou Formation is a fossiliferous geological formation located in the Xixia Basin of China. The formation dates back to the Late Cretaceous (Cenomanian-Coniacian) and fossilized eggs of dinosaurs and turtles are commonly reported from the formation. Dinosaur taxa are also reported from the unit.

== Paleobiota of the Gaogou Formation ==
Color key: Taxon / Reclassified taxon / Taxon falsely reported as present / Dubious taxon or junior synonym / Ichnotaxon / Ootaxon / Morphotaxon	Notes; Uncertain or tentative taxa are in small text; ~~crossed out~~ taxa are discredited.

=== Dinosaurs ===
Genus	Species	Location	Stratigraphic Position	Material	Notes	Images
Baotianmansaurus	B. henanensis	Neixiang		"Partial vertebrae and scapula."	A titanosauriform.	
Beibeilong	B. sinensis	Heimaogou		"Embryonic skeleton with associated partial nest."	A large caenagnathid.	

=== Eggs ===
Genus	Species	Location	Stratigraphic Position	Material	Notes	Images
Dendroolithus	D. xichuanensis	Xichuan		"Eggshell fragments and collapsed eggs."	Dendroolithid eggs laid by ornithopods, sauropod or theropods.	
Dendroolithus	Indeterminate	Xixia		"Intact eggs and egg clutches."	Dendroolithid eggs laid by ornithopods, sauropod or theropods.	
Dictyoolithus	D. neixiangensis	Xixia		Not specified.	Dictyoolithid eggs.	
Faveoloolithus	Indeterminate	Nanxiang		"Single egg."	Faveoloolithid egg.	
Macroelongatoolithus	M. xixiaensis	Heimaogou		"Partial nest of 6-8 eggs, and eggshell fragments."	Elongatoolithid eggs laid by Beibeilong.	
Macroelongatoolithus	M. xixiaensis	Neixiang, Xixia		"Isolated eggs and complete egg clutches."	Elongatoolithid eggs laid by caenagnathids.	
Neixiangoolithus	N. yani	Neixiang		"Multiple egg clutches."	Testudoolithid eggs laid by a turtle.	
Paraspheroolithus	P. cf. irenensis	Xixia		"Complete egg clutches."	Spheroolithid eggs.	
Placoolithus	P. tumiaolingensis	Yunxian		"Several eggs and egg clutches."	Dendroolithid eggs laid by ornithopods, sauropod or theropods.	
Prismatoolithus	P. gebiensis	Neixiang, Xixia		"Several egg clutches."	Prismatoolithid eggs laid by troodontids.	
Youngoolithus	Y. xiaguanensis	Xixia		"Clutch with 4 eggs."	Youngoolithid eggs.	

=== Flora ===
Genus	Species	Location	Stratigraphic Position	Material	Notes	Images
Araucariaceae indet.	Indeterminate	Xixia		"Amber pieces."	A conifer.	
Plantae indet.	Indeterminate	Not specified.	Upper Member	"Rhizoliths."	Root traces.	

=== Invertebrates ===
Genus	Species	Location	Stratigraphic Position	Material	Notes	Images
Beaconites	B. antarcticus	Not specified.	Upper Member	"Horizontal-overtical, straight to slightly curved, single, lined, meniscate burrows."	Invertebrate traces.	
Beaconites	B. capronus	Not specified.	Upper Member	"Horizontal to vertical, straight to slightly curved, lined, unbranched burrows."	Invertebrate traces.	
Beaconites	B. coronus	Not specified.	Upper Member	"Mostly horizontal to vertical, meniscate burrows."	Invertebrate traces.	
Gastruichnus	G. xixiaensis	Not specified.	Upper Member	"Large, high dipping, slightly curved and unbranched burrow."	Traces made by molluscs.	
Palaeophycus	P. heberti	Not specified.	Upper Member	"Straight to curved, horizontal to vertical, unbranched and lined burrows."	Invertebrate traces.	
Palaeophycus	P. megas	Not specified.	Upper Member	"Curved, horizontal to vertical, unbranched and lined burrows."	Invertebrate traces.	
Skolithos	S. linearis	Not specified.		"Cylindrical burrows."	Invertebrate traces.	
Skolithos	S. magnus	Not specified.		"Cylindrical to subcylindrical, vertical and slightly curved burrows."	Invertebrate traces.	

=== Turtles ===
Genus	Species	Location	Stratigraphic Position	Material	Notes	Images
Yuchelys	Y. nanyangensis	Neixiang		"Partial skeleton with carapace."	A nanhsiungchelyid.	

== See also ==
- List of dinosaur-bearing rock formations
- List of stratigraphic units with dinosaur trace fossils
- Dinosaur eggs
- Cenomanian-Turonian extinction event
