= Jinhua Formation =

Geological formation in Zhejiang, China

- Stratigraphic range: Turonian-Coniacian; ~92–88 Ma
- Type: Geological formation
- Unit of: Qujiang Group
- Underlies: Quxian Formation
- Overlies: Zhongdal Formation

Lithology
- Primary: Red or variegated clastic rock

Location
- Region: Zhejiang
- Country: China

The Jinhua Formation (simplified Chinese: 金华组; traditional Chinese: 金華組; pinyin: Jīnhuá Zǔ) is a geological formation in Zhejiang, China, whose strata date back to the Late Cretaceous period (Turonian to Coniacian). It was initially believed to be Early Cretaceous (late Albian) in age.

Dinosaur remains are among the fossils that have been recovered from the formation.

== Fossil content ==
Color key: Taxon / Reclassified taxon / Taxon falsely reported as present / Dubious taxon or junior synonym / Ichnotaxon / Ootaxon / Morphotaxon	Notes; Uncertain or tentative taxa are in small text; ~~crossed out~~ taxa are discredited.

=== Dinosaurs ===
==== Sauropods ====
Sauropods of the Jinhua Formation
Genus	Species	Location	Stratigraphic position	Material	Notes	Images
Dongyangosaurus	D. sinensis	Zhejiang Province, China	Turonian to Coniacian	Partial postcranial skeleton.	A titanosaurian sauropod	
Jiangshanosaurus	J. lixianensis	Zhjiang Province, China	Turonian and Coniacian	Partial postcranial skeleton.	A titanosauriform sauropod	

== See also ==
- List of dinosaur-bearing rock formations
