= Marnes Rouges Inférieures Formation =

- Stratigraphic range: Late Campanian - Maastrichtian; ~72.5–70 Ma
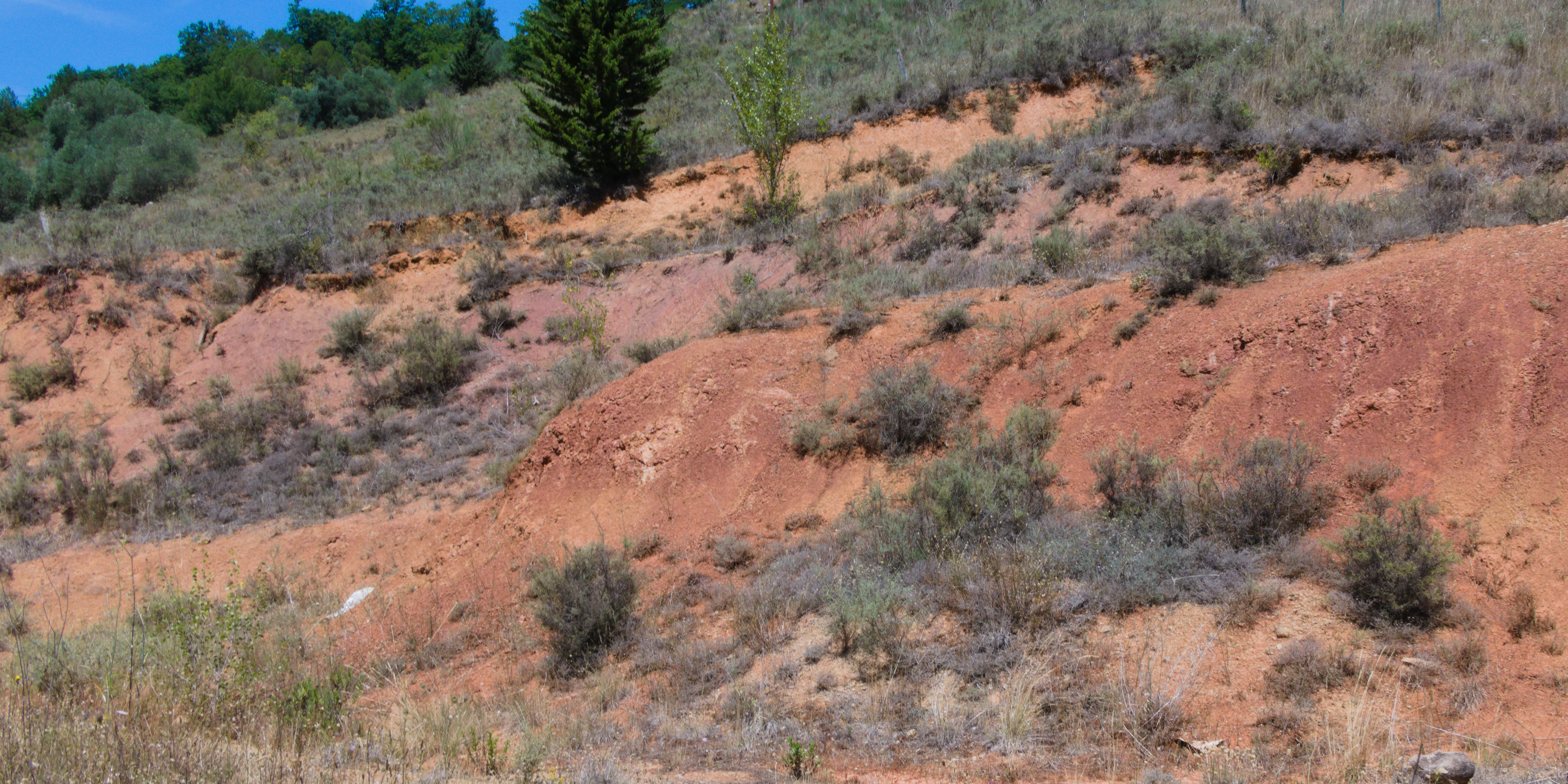
- The Marnes rouges inférieures Formation at Campagne-sur-Aude, left bank of the Aude River.
- Type: Geological formation
- Sub-units: Marnes rouges de Campagne Member, Grès des Estous Member, Marnes rouges de la Maurine Member, Fleuri Gonglomerate Member
- Underlies: Calcaires de Vignevieille Formation
- Overlies: Grès d'Alet Formation
- Thickness: 130 m (430 ft)

Lithology
- Primary: Mudstone
- Other: Sandstone, conglomerates, siltstones

Location
- Coordinates: 42°91′N 2°20′E
- Region: Occitania
- Country: France

Type section
- Named for: French: "Lower Red Marls"
- Marnes Rouges Inférieures Formation (France) Marnes Rouges Inférieures Formation (Occitanie)

The Marnes rouges inférieures Formation (lower red marls Formation) is a geological formation located in the south of France and dating from the upper Cretaceous (upper Campanian to lower Maastrichtian) between 72.5 and 70 million years ago approximately.

This formation consists of marls, sandstones, conglomerates, and siltstones, corresponding to fluvial deposits (river channels and floodplains) deposited in what was then the Ibero-Armorican island, a landmass made up of large part of France and Iberian Peninsula.

The Marnes rouges inférieures Formation contains abundant remains of terrestrial vertebrates, mainly titanosaurians sauropod dinosaurs.

== Location ==
The Marnes rouges inférieures Formation is located in the department of Aude and Ariège in Occitania region. The formation crops out mainly in the Rennes-les-Bains syncline, located in the Upper Aude Valley, whose rocks can be seen particularly near the villages of Campagne-sur-Aude, Espéraza, Fa, Granès, Rennes-le-Château, Brenac, Saint-Ferriol.

The Marnes rouges inférieures Formation conformably overlies the Grès d'Alet Formation (Alet Sandtones Formation) and conformably underlies the Calcaires de Vignevieille Formation (Vignevieille limestones Formation).

The Marnes rouges inférieures Formation is also present in Ariège department in the Benaix, Dreuilhe, Péreille, and Le Mas d'Azil anticlines, where it lies unconformably on several Upper Cretaceous formations Coniacian to late Campanian in age.

== Lithostratigraphy and depositional environment ==
The Marnes rouges inférieures Formation reaches about 130 metres (430 ft) in thickness and is subdivided into four members including from bottom to top:

- The Marnes rouges de Campagne Member (Red Marls of Campagne) : this member is composed of marmorized, ochre to red sandy mudstones, with a few conglomerates and sandstones levels. These rocks correspond to floodplain silts. These layers reach about 20 metres (66 ft) in thickness according Fondevilla et al. or 25 to 30 m (82.0 to 98.4 ft) according to Bilotte.
- The Grès des Estous Member (Estous Sandtone) : about 10 metres (33 ft) in thickness (a little less according to Fondevilla et al.), this member is almost exclusively composed of sandstones layers sometimes separated by thin red mudstone levels. These sandstones correspond to braided river channels.
- The Marnes rouges de la Maurine Member (Red Marls of Maurine) : this member is predominantly composed of red mustones, with minor ochre brown, orange, and purple mudstones, and some conglomeratic and silty levels. The mudstones correspond to floodplains silts, while the conglomeratic intercalations represent ancient river channels.. The presence of numerous calcareous pedogenetic concretions and the intense marmorization of the mudstones indicate the existence of paleosols.. Bilotte attributes to this member a thickness of 20 to 30 m (65.6 to 98.4 ft). Fondevilla et al. assign it a much greater thickness, around 100 m (328.1 ft).
- The Poudingue Fleuri Member (Fleuri Conglomerate) : this member, 5 to 15 m (16.4 to 49.2 ft) thick, consists of a conglomerate with a sandstone-carbonate matrix and calcareous cement. This conglomerate is of fluvial origin and corresponds to former gravel banks with large pebbles. In places, the Poudingue Fleuri forms the top of the Marnes rouges inférieures Formation, directly supporting the Vignevieille Limestones Formation. In other sections, the Poudingue Fleuri is intercalated in the upper part of the Marnes rouges de la Maurine Member.
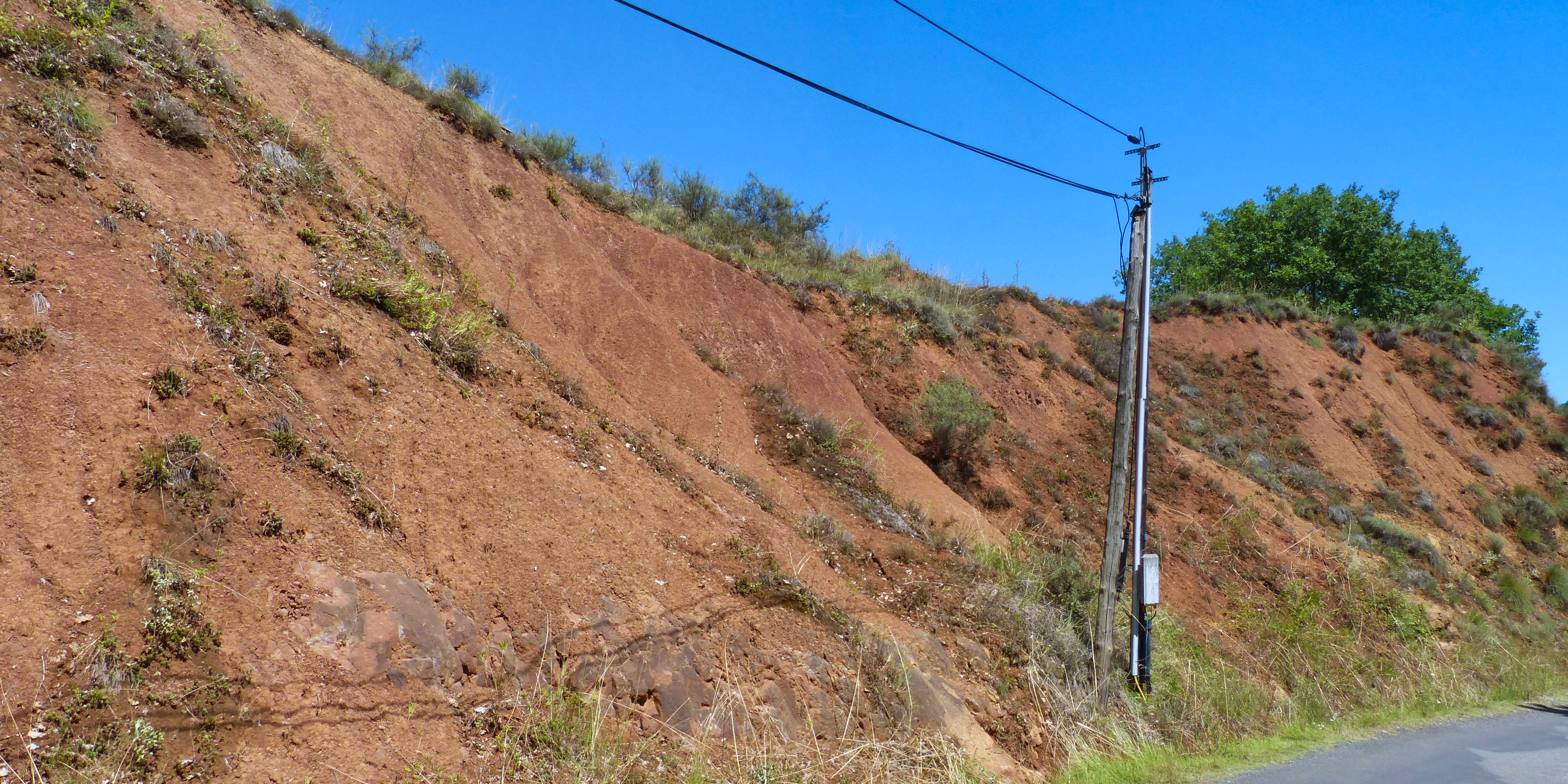
The Marnes rouges de Campagne Member outcropping along the D2 road at Campagne-sur-Aude (Brezilhou hamlet).

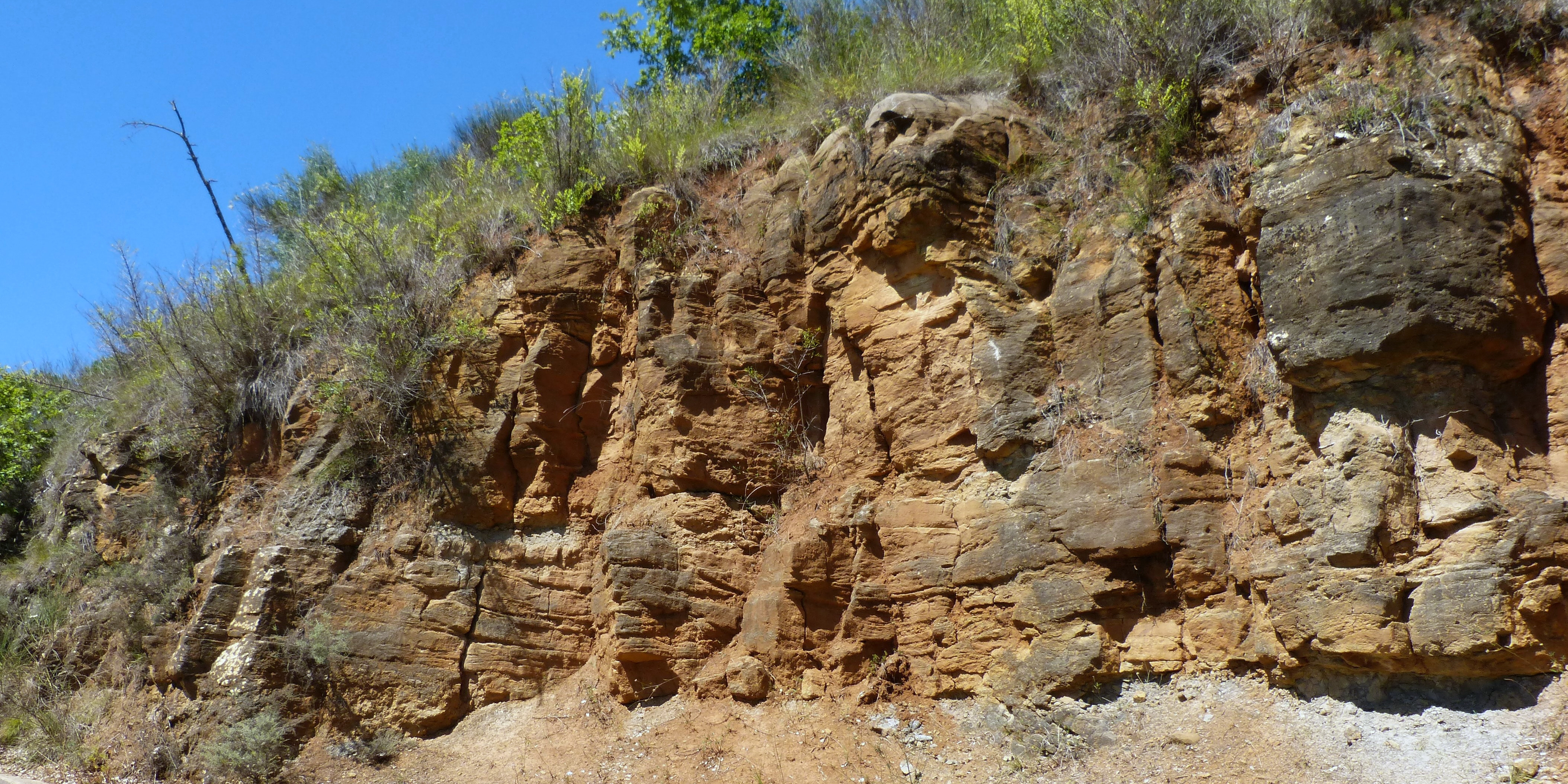
Sandstones of the Grès des Estous Member along the road leading to the Bellevue site.

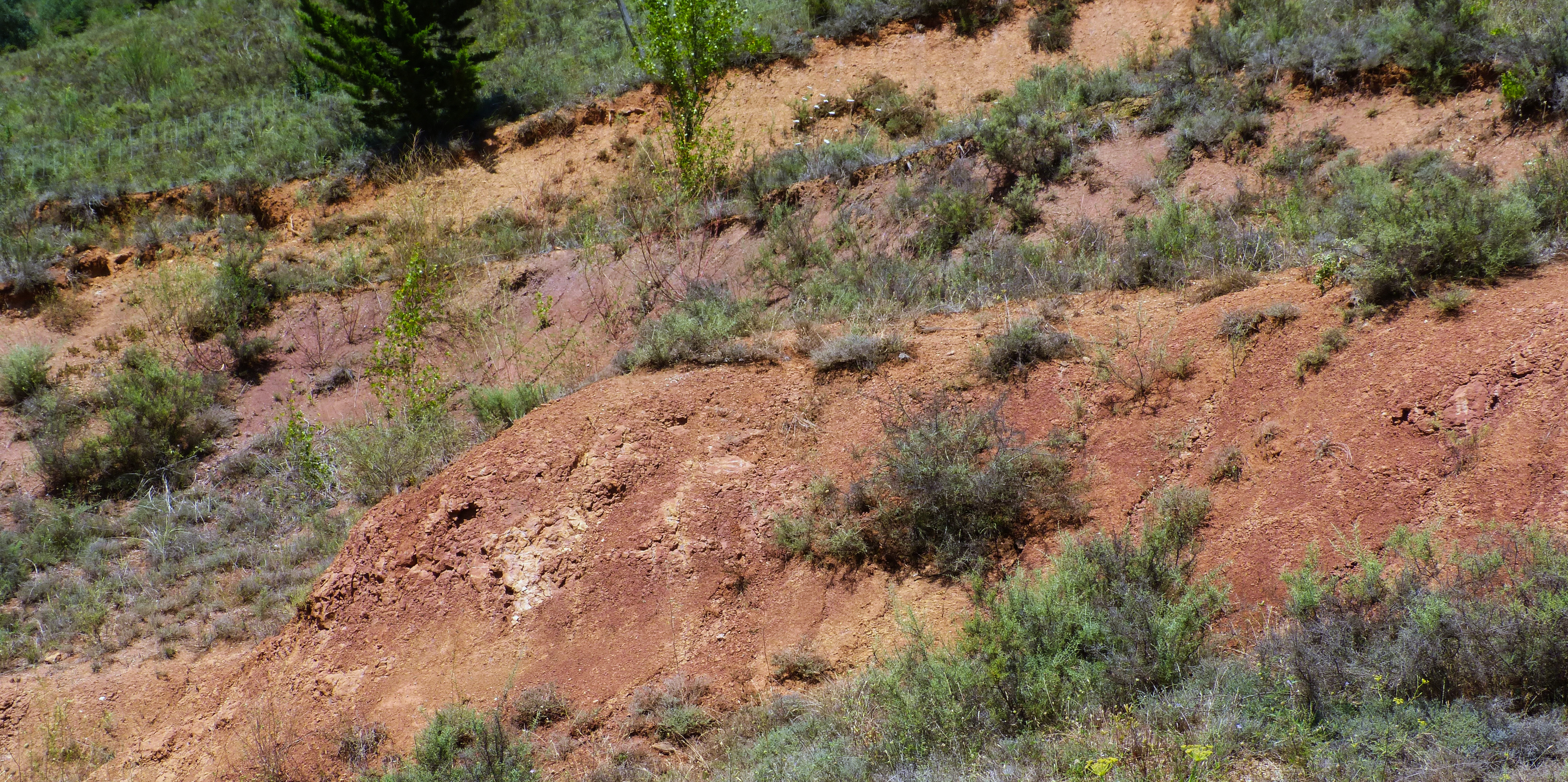
The Marnes rouges de la Maurine Member at the Bellevue site. Left bank of the Aude river.

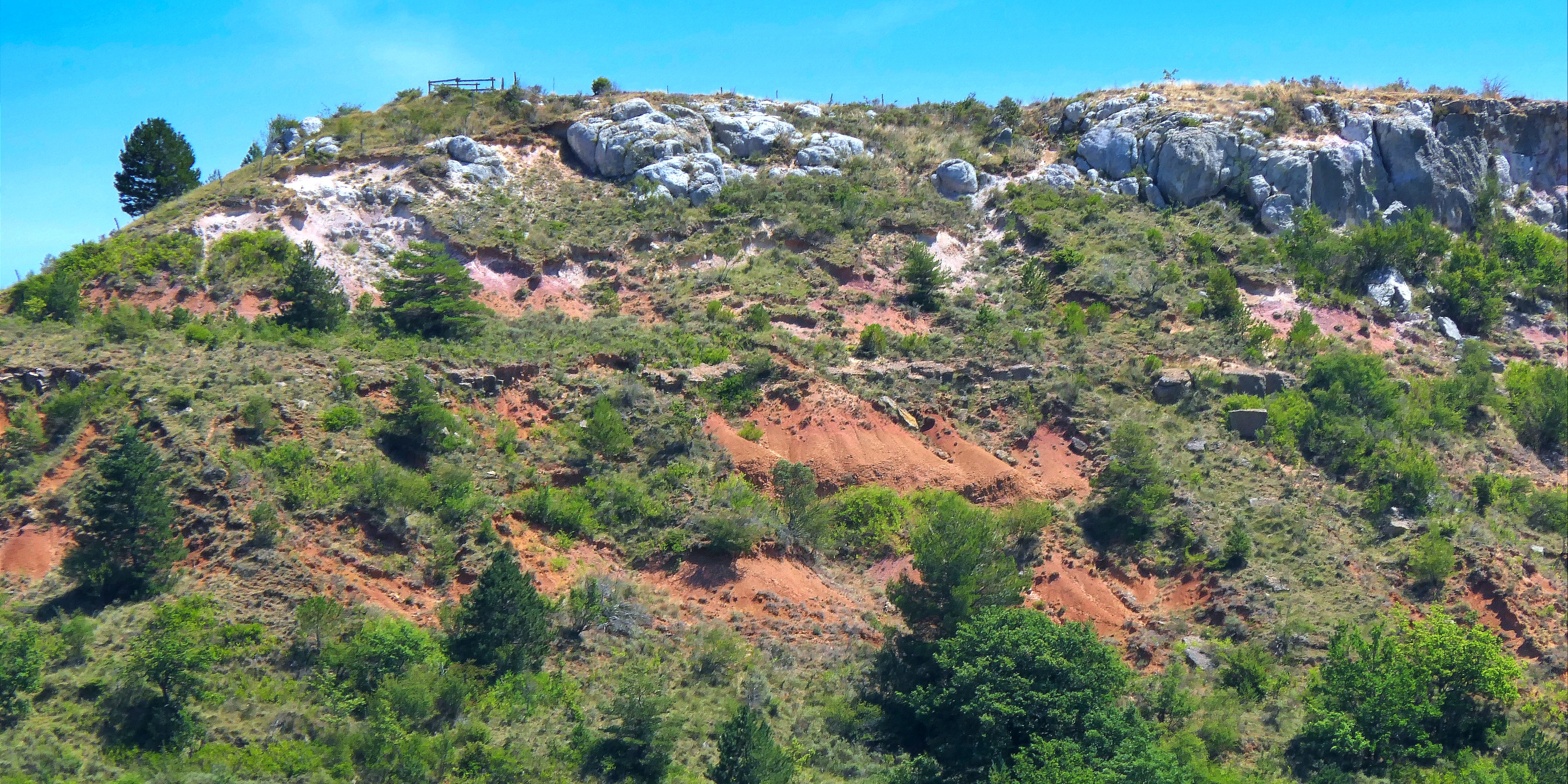
The Marnes rouges de la Maurine Member (including the Poudingue Fleuri) overlain by the Vignevieille Limestones Formation. Right bank of the Aude river at Campagne-sur-Aude (Section IV of Fondevilla et al.)

== Dating ==
In 1985, Bilotte reported in the marnes rouges de Campagne Member the presence of a palynological association suggesting a late Campanian age, and consequently attributed a Maastrichtian age to the three overlying members..

In 2016, a magnetostratigraphic study revealed that the upper part of the Marnes rouges de Campagne, the Grès des Estous, and the first twenty meters of the Marnes rouges de la Maurine belong to the normal chron C32n corresponding to the beginning of the lower Maastrichtian. More specifically, the vertebrate localities in the basal part of the Marnes rouges de la Maurine are located at the top of subchron C32n.1n, corresponding to an age of 71.5 million years. (Note: A similar age correlation for the Bellevue site, presented in 2012 by Bernat Vila et al., was considered to correspond to the Late Campanian, as the authors based their interpretation on the 2008 international chronostratigraphic scale, which placed the Campanian-Maastrichtian boundary at 70.6 ± 0.6 million years ago. Subsequently, the age of this boundary was revised to 72.1 ± 0.2 Ma in 2012 (the age to which Fondevilla et al. refer in their 2016 magnetostratigraphic study to place the Bellevue site in the Lower Maastrichtian), then at 72.2 ± 0.2 Ma in 2024.) The rest of the Marnes de la Maurine, as well as the Poudingue Fleuri, are located in the reverse chron C31r, corresponding to the upper part of the lower Maastrichtian. Thus, the age of the Poudingue Fleuri, at the top of the Marnes rouges inférieures Formation, is estimated to be between 70 and 69.5 million years old. Above, the upper Maastrichtian could be limited to a few meters in the Vignevieille limestones or is totally absent. Regarding the lower part of the Marnes rouges inférieures Formation, the Campanian-Maastrichtian boundary (set at 72.2 million years) (Note: The International Commission on Stratigraphy has revised the age of the Campanian-Maastrichtian boundary several times."Supplementary Chart Information". International Commission on Stratigraphy. It was calibrated at 70.6 ± 0.6 million years in 2008, then adjusted to 72.1 ± 0.2 Ma in 2012, and to 72.2 ± 0.2 Ma in 2024.) would be located below the section sampled by Fondevila et al., probably in the middle or lower part of the Marnes rouges de Campagne Member, or even lower in the Grès d'Alet Formation. These results indicate that in the Upper Aude Valley, the Marnes rouges inférieures Formation dates almost exclusively from the lower Maastrichtian, with only the lower half of the Marnes rouges de Campagne Member possibly dating from the top of the Campanian.

In the Plantaurel massif in Ariège, the Marnes rouges inférieures Formation becomes younger due to the progressive and diachronic migration of continental facies towards the west in a context of marine regression. In this region, the Marnes rouges inférieures Formation grade laterally into the Marnes d'Auzas Formation, which has a lagoonal and continental origin and dates back to the late Maastrichtian.

== The Bellevue quarry ==
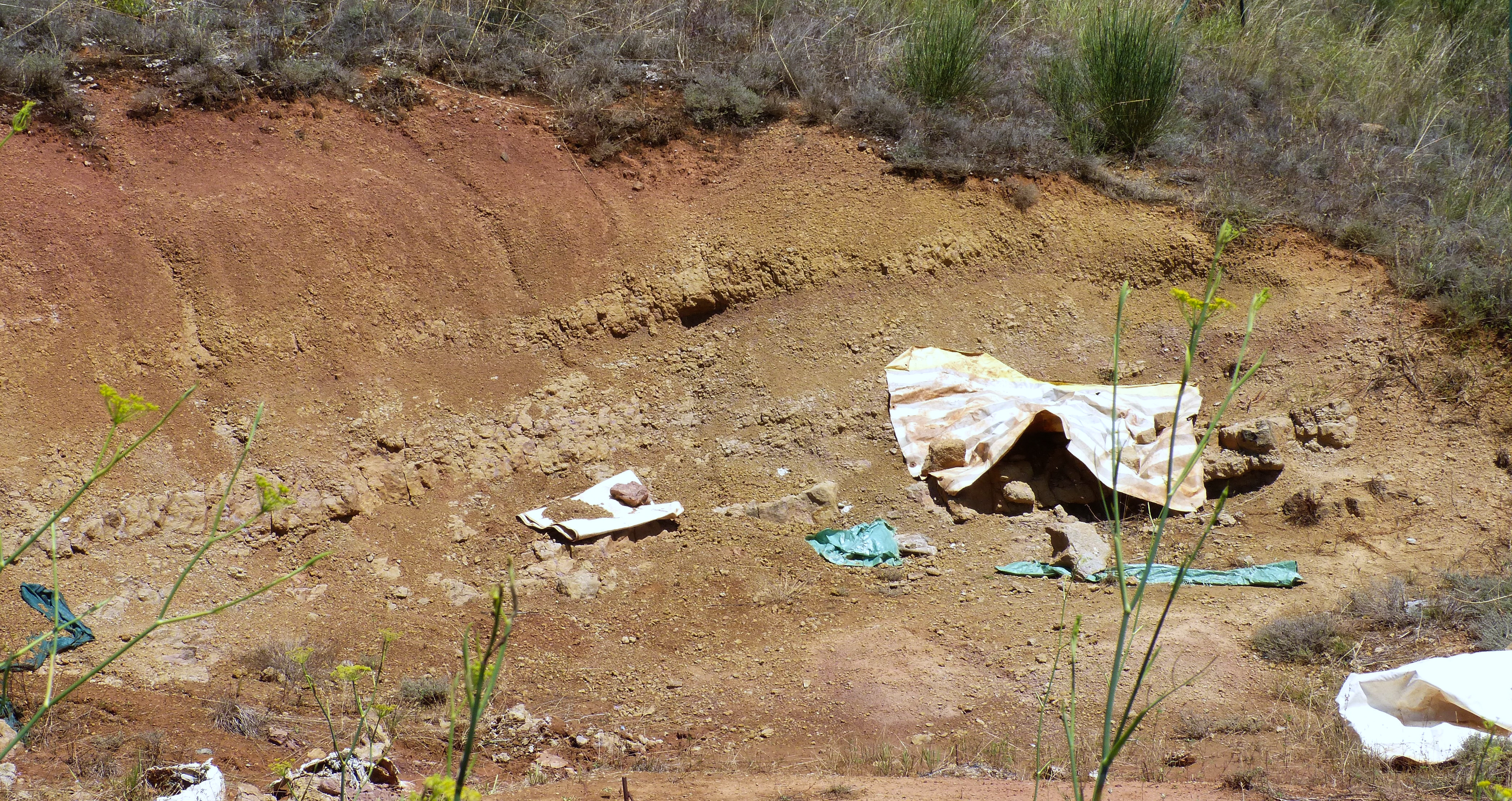
The Bellevue site in 2023.

The Bellevue quarry in Campagne-sur-Aude is the main vertebrate site of the Marnes rouges inférieures Formation and is one of the richest Upper Cretaceous sites in Europe. It is located at the base of the Marnes rouges de la Maurine Member just a few meters above the Grès des Estous Member, and corresponds to a former river meander where many disarticulated bones and entire corpses have accumulated. Vertebrate remains are concentrated in conglomerate and siltstone levels 4 to 6 m (13.1 to 19.7 ft) thick intercalated in the mudstones. The different fossiliferous levels (six recorded in 1999, then seven in 2002) are all located at the top of the conglomeratic levels. The variable state of preservation of the bones (from very eroded to well preserved), most often disarticulated, as well as the faunal composition, which varies from one level to another, testify to more or less significant transport and suggest considerable taphonomic biases in the composition of the fauna, which cannot be considered representative of an ecosystem.

The Bellevue quarry has yielded several thousand fossils including at least 1400 dinosaur bones belonging mainly to titanosaurian sauropod. This locality was long considered a monotaxic titanosaur bonebed represented by Ampelosaurus atacis. Since the 2010s, however, several studies have suggested the presence of a multispecific titanosaur assemblage at the Bellevue site. En 2012, Bernat Vila et al. distinguished three morphotypes based on femur morphology and tentatively assigned one of them to the genus Lirainosaurus. A generic attribution contested by Veronica Díez Díaz et al. in 2013. In 2021, Veronica Díez Díaz et al. also admitted the existence of a second titanosaur at Bellevue but found more similarities with the genus Garrigatitan from the Upper Campanian of southeastern France. In 2023 and 2024, Bernat Vila et al. presented at several scientific conferences the preliminary results of an in-depth study of the titanosaur remains of Bellevue confirming the presence of several titanosaur species (possibly up to four) at this site. The results of this study imply a future modification of the diagnosis of Ampelosaurus and the material attributed to it, and the description of at least one new species.

== Paleontology ==
The Marnes Rouges Inférieures Formation contains many fossils of continental vertebrates. They are especially abundant at the base of the Marnes rouges de la Maurine Member but are also present in the Grès des Estous Member. These vertebrate remains are represented by teeth and bones as well as more or less complete eggs and shell fragments. (Note: Fossil eggs are subject to a separate classification (or parataxonomy) based on the microstructure of the shells and are classified into oogenera and oospecies. An oospecies may have been laid by several closely related biological species. For example, in the case of Ibero-Armorican titanosaurs, the oospecies Megaloolithus aureliensis and M. siruguei may have been laid by a stock of species such as Ampelosaurus atacis, Lirainosaurus astibiae, Atsinganosaurus velauciensis, Lohuecotitan pandafilandi, and others. The oospecies Megaloolithus mamillare and Fusioolithus baghensis is thought to have been laid by other titanosaur lineages that arrived later in Europe.) Some invertebrates (freshwater gastropods and bivalves) and plant remains are also known. The macroflora, found particularly in Bellevue, is represented by palm and cycad leaves, as well as fragments of angiosperm wood from trees 10 to 15 m high.

Color key: Taxon / Reclassified taxon / Taxon falsely reported as present / Dubious taxon or junior synonym / Ichnotaxon / Ootaxon / Morphotaxon	Notes; Uncertain or tentative taxa are in small text; ~~crossed out~~ taxa are discredited.

== Fish ==
Fish of the Marnes Rouges Inférieures Formation
Genus	Species	Location	Stratigraphic position	Fossils	Notes	Images
Axelrodichthys	A. megadromos	Bellevue	Marnes rouges de la Maurine Member (lower part)	MDE-C3-02-57, a small fragment of a tooth plate	A freshwater mawsoniid coelacanth.	Axelrodichthys megadromos.
Lepisosteus	Indeterminate	Bellevue	Marnes rouges de la Maurine Member (lower part)	Ganoid scales and teeth.	A gar	

== Crocodyliformes ==
Crocodyliformes of the Marnes Rouges Inférieures Formation
Genus	Species	Location	Stratigraphic position	Fossils	Notes	Images
Allodaposuchidae indet.	Undescribed form	Bellevue	Marnes rouges de la Maurine Member (lower part)	A rear skull (specimen MDE C3-276) published in 2017 was assigned to an undetermined allodaposuchid. Other unpublished allodaposuchid remains are represented by a complete skull (MDE-C3-1402), vertebrae, limb and pelvic bones, and isolated teeth.	An allodaposuchid eusuchian. The complete skull, although not yet described, was initially attributed to Allodaposuchus precedens, a species later found to be endemic to Eastern Europe. (Note: In 2016, Martin et al. attributed to Allodaposuchus precedens several skulls from the late Campanian site of Velaux in southeastern France. In 2021, Alejandro Blanco reclassified the material from Velaux into a new species, Allodaposuchus iberoarmoricanus, the species A. precedens being restricted to Romania..) The complete skull from Bellevue shows more similarities with the Spanish taxa Musturzabalsuchus buffetauti and Allodaposuchus subjuniperus with which it shares a marked lateral festooned profile of the snout.	Life restoration of Allodaposuchus subjuniperus

== Turtles ==
Turtles of the Marnes Rouges Inférieures Formation
Genus	Species	Location	Stratigraphic position	Fossils	Notes	Images
Compsemydidae indet.	New taxon	Bellevue	Marnes rouges de la Maurine Member (lower part)	One skull and an isolated costal plate	An unpublished taxon close to Calissounemys matheroni from the Late Campanian of Provence.	
Foxemys	F. mechinorum	Bellevue	Marnes de la Maurine Member (lower part)	MDE-C3-774, a skull and shell fragments	A foxemydine bothremydin	

== Pterosauria ==
Pterosauria of the Marnes Rouges Inférieures Formation
Genus	Species	Location	Stratigraphic position	Fossils	Notes	Images
Pterosauria indet.	Indeterminate	Bellevue	Marnes rouges de la Maurine Member (lower part)	Several hollow bone fragments and possibly a last phalanx of the fourth digit.	Possibly an azhdarchid. The material is too fragmentary, and the identification of the recovered elements (a rib or a terminal phalanx of the wing finger) is too uncertain to allow for a clear and definitive assignment to this clade.	

== Dinosaurs (including birds) ==
Dinosaurs of the Marnes Rouges Inférieures Formation
Genus	Species	Location	Stratigraphic position	Fossils	Notes	Images
Ampelosaurus	A. atacis	Bellevue	Marnes rouges de la Maurine Member (lower part)	A braincase; a right dentary; one tooth (Note: Three yet uncatalogued teeth are also known.); cervical, dorsal, and caudal vertebrae; numerous limbs bones, scapulocoracoids, pelvis bones; and four osteoderms.	A lirainosaurine lithostrotian. The fossils attributed to Ampelosaurus are currently being restudied because some of this material belongs to at least one new titanosaur species. An unpublished partial skeleton (nicknamed Eva) including an almost complete disarticulated skull, was also referred to A. atacis. However, a preliminary study based on lower jaw morphology suggests that the Eva specimen may belong to a distinct taxon as the jaws of both species are adapted for browsing in different height of the vegetation.	MDE-C3-247, Ampelosaurus atacis holotype consisting of three articulated middle dorsal vertebrae MDE-C3-265, a posterior cervical vertebra attributed to Ampelosaurus atacis MDE-C3-192, a spine-shaped osteoderm attributed to Ampelosaurus atacis. It could also belong to another species of titanosaur
Cairanoolithus	C. dughii	Bellevue; Gourg de l'Encantado; Rennes-le-Château/Founbit; La Valdieu; Les Boudous	Marnes rouges de la Maurine Member (lower part)	Eggs and shell fragments	Eggs tentatively attributed to a nodosaurid ankylosaur	
Cairanoolithus	C. roussetensis	Bellevue; Rennes-le-Château; La Valdieu	Marnes rouges de la Maurine Member (lower part)	Eggs and shell fragments	Eggs tentatively attributed to a nodosaurid ankylosaur	
Dromaeosauridae indet.	Indeterminate	Bellevue	Marnes rouges de la Maurine Member (lower part)	Teeth.	An indeterminate dromaeosaurid	
Fusioolithus	F. baghensis	F5; Véraza	Top of the Marnes rouges de la Maurine Member (above the Poudingue Fleuri)	Shell fragments	Initially described under the name Megaloolithus pseudomamillare this oospecies was reinterpreted as a junior synonym of Megaloolithus baghensis, then finally assigned to the new oogenus Fusioolithus in 2015. This oospecies is present in France, Spain, India, Argentina, Peru and Bolivia. The presence of embryonic remains in such eggs in Argentina (Auca Mahuevo site) proves that this oospecies was laid by titanosaurs.	
Gargantuavis	G. philoinos	Bellevue	Marnes rouges de la Maurine Member (lower part)	MDE-C3-525 (holotype), an incomplete pelvis.	A giant flightless bird	Holotype pelvis of Gargantuavis philoinos
Megaloolithus	M. mamillare	Roque Fumade 4	Marnes rouges de la Maurine Member (upper part, but below the Poudingue Fleuri)	Shell fragments	Eggs attributed to titanosaurian sauropods	A clutch of about ten hatched eggs, found near Rennes-le-Château
Megaloolithus	M. siruguei	Les Labadous; Rennes-le-Château; Roque Fumade 1,2,3 and 5	Marnes rouges de la Maurine Member (lower, middle and upper levels (but below the Poudingue Fleuri))	Eggs and shell fragments	Eggs attributed to titanosaurian sauropods	A clutch of about ten hatched eggs, found near Rennes-le-Château
Montanoolithus	M. labadousensis	Les Labadous	Marnes rouges de la Maurine Member (middle part)	Shell fragments	Eggs attributed to a dromaeosaurid theropod.	
Struthiosaurini indet.	Indeterminate	Bellevue; Espéraza	Marnes rouges de la Maurine Member (lower part), Grès des Estous Member	Isolated dermal plates, a right scapula	Represented in the Marnes rouges de la Maurine by isolated dermal plates. An incomplete right scapula from the Grès des Estous could belong to a struthiosaurin nodosaurine distinct from Struthiosaurus.	
Rhabdodon	R. priscus	Bellevue, Espéraza, Gourg de l'Encantado	Marnes rouges de la Maurine Member (lower part), Grès des Estous Member	Two dentaries, one maxilla, two maxillary teeth, two dentary teeth, dorsal vertebrae, sacrum elements, numerous caudal vertebrae, many bones of the forelimbs, pelvic bones, many femora and tibiae, and some foot bones.	A rhabdodontid ornithopod	Humerus of Rhabdodon from Bellevue. Femurs of Rhabdodon from Bellevue.
Titanosauria indet.	Indeterminate	Gourg de l'Encantado	Marnes rouges de la Maurine Member (lower part)	MDE-RC10-20, an osteoderm	The spine shaped osteoderm MDE-RC10-20 was first referred to a nodosaurine ankylosaur. It was then reinterpreted as belonging to a titanosaurian sauropod.	Titanosaur osteoderm discovered near Rennes-le-Château.

== See also ==
- List of dinosaur-bearing rock formations
  - List of stratigraphic units with dinosaur trace fossils
    - Dinosaur eggs

== Bibliography ==
=== Geology and dating ===
- Bilotte, Michel; Tambareau, Yvette; Villatte, Juliette (1983). "Le Crétacé supérieur et la limite Crétacé-Tertiaire en faciès continental dans le versant nord des Pyrénées". Géologie Méditerranéenne (in French). X (3–4): 269–276.
- Bilotte, Michel (1985). "Le Crétacé supérieur des plates-formes est-pyrénéennes" (PDF). Strata. Série 2 (in French). 5: 1–438.
- Bilotte, Michel; Koess, Laurent; Le Loeuff, Jean (1999). "- 96 à - 65 Ma autour de la vallée de l'Aude" (PDF). Strata. Série 2 (in French). 33: 1–116.
- Fondevilla, Víctor; Dinarès-Turell, Jaume; Vila, Bernat; Le Loeuff, Jean; Estrada, Rita; Oms, Oriol; Galobart, Àngel (2016). "Magnetostratigraphy of the Maastrichtian continental record in the Upper Aude Valley (northern Pyrenees, France): Placing age constraints on the succession of dinosaur-bearing sites". Cretaceous Research. 57: 457–472. doi:10.1016/j.cretres.2015.08.009.
- International Commission on Stratigraphy (2008). "International chronostratigraphic chart" (PDF).
- International Commission on Stratigraphy (2012). "International chronostratigraphic chart. International Commission on Stratigraphy August 2012" (PDF).
- International Commission on Stratigraphy (2024). "International chronostratigraphic chart. International Commission on Stratigraphy December 2024" (PDF).

=== Dinosaurs (including birds) ===
- Buffetaut, Eric; Le Loeuff, Jean (1998). "A new giant ground bird from the Upper Cretaceous of southern France". Journal of the Geological Society, London. 155 (1): 1–4. doi:10.1144/gsjgs.155.1.0001.
- Clottes, Pierre; Raynaud, Christian (1983). "Le gisement à dinosauriens de Campagne-sur-Aude – Espéraza: observations préliminaires, premiers résultats". Bulletin de la Société d'Études Scientifiques de l'Aude (in French). 83: 5–14.
- Cousin, Rémi (1997). "Les gisements d'oeufs de dinosauriens des Hautes Corbières et des Corbières orientales (Aude): ponte, nidification, microstructure des coquilles". Bulletin de la Société d'Études Scientifiques de l'Aude (in French). 97: 29–46.
- Dhiman, Harsha; Prasad, Guntupalli V.R.; Goswami, Anjali (2019). "Parataxonomic and palaeobiogeographic significance of dinosaur eggshells fragments from the Upper Cretaceous strata of the Cauvery Basin, South India". Historical Biology. 31 (10): 1–13. doi:10.1080/08912963.2018.1450408.
- Díez Díaz, Verónica; Garcia, Géraldine; Pereda Suberbiola, Xabier; Jentgen-Ceschino, Benjamin; Stein, Koen; Godefroit, Pascal; Valentin, Xavier (2021). "A new titanosaur (Dinosauria: Sauropoda) from the Upper Cretaceous of Velaux-La Bastide Neuve (southern France)". Historical Biology. 33 (11): 1–20. doi:10.1080/08912963.2020.1841184.
- Díez Díaz, Verónica; Pereda Suberbiola, Xabier; Sanz, Jose Luis (2013). "Appendicular skeleton and dermal armour of the Late Cretaceous titanosaur Lirainosaurus astibiae (Dinosauria: Sauropoda) from Spain". Palaeontologia Electronica. 2 (2): 19A. doi:10.26879/350.
- Díez Díaz, Verónica; Tortosa, Thierry; Le Loeuff, Jean (2013). "Sauropod diversity in the Late Cretaceous of southwestern Europe: The lessons of odontology". Annales de Paléontologie. 99: 119–129. doi:10.1016/j.annpal.2012.12.002.
- Fernández, Mariela S.; Khosla, Ashu (2015). "Parataxonomic review of the Upper Cretaceous dinosaur eggshells belonging to the oofamily Megaloolithidae from India and Argentina". Historical Biology: An International Journal of Paleobiology. 27 (2): 158–180. doi:10.1080/08912963.2013.871718. hdl:11336/11654.
- Fondevilla, V.; Riera, V.; Vila, B.; Sellés, A.G.; Dinarès-Turell, J.; Vicens, E.; Gaete, R.; Oms, O; Galobart, À (2019). "Chronostratigraphic synthesis of the latest Cretaceous dinosaur turnover in south-western Europe". Earth-Science Rewiews. 191: 168–189. doi:10.1016/j.earscirev.2019.01.007.
- Le Loeuff, J.; Buffetaut, E.; Cavin, L.; Martin, M.; Martin, V.; Tong, H. (1994). "An armoured titanosaurid sauropod from the Late Cretaceous of southern France and the occurrence of osteoderms in the Titanosauridae". GAIA - Ecological Perspectives for Science and Society. 10: 155–159.
- Le Loeuff, Jean (1995). "Ampelosaurus atacis (nov. gen., nov. sp.), un nouveau Titanosauridae (Dinosauria, Sauropoda) du Crétacé supérieur de la Haute Vallée de l'Aude (France)". Comptes Rendus de l'Académie des Sciences, Série IIA (in French). 321: 693–699.
- Pereda-Suberbiola, Xabier (1993). "Armoured dinosaurs from the late Cretaceous of Southern France: a review". Revue de Paléobiologie (volume special 7): 163–172.
- Sellés, Albert G.; Galobart, Àngel (2015). "Reassessing the endemic European Upper Cretaceous dinosaur egg Cairanoolithus". Historical Biology. 28 (5): 583–596. doi:10.1080/08912963.2014.998666.
- Sellés, Albert G.; Vila, Bernat; Díez Díaz, Verónica; Le Loeuff, Jean (2025). "Ecological niche partitioning in European titanosaurs (Dinosauria, Sauropoda): data from the lower jaw morphology" (PDF). Book of Abstracts of the 22th Annual Meeting of the European Association of Vertebrate Palaeontologists, 30 June – 5 July 2025, Kraków, Poland. Palaeovertebrata, Special Volume: 1–375. doi:10.18563/pv.eavp2025.
- Souillat, Christelle; Le Loeuff, Jean (2002). "Numéro Spécial 2002". La Lettre de Dinosauria (in French): 1–23.
- Souillat, Christelle (2003). "Le vrai visage d'Eva". La Lettre de Dinosauria (in French). 22: 1–2.
- Vianey-Liaud, Monique; Khosla, Ashu; Garcia, Géraldine (2003). "Relationships between Europan and Indian dinosaur eggs and eggshells of the oofamily Megaloolithidae". Journal of Vertebrate Paleontology. 23 (3): 575–585. doi:10.1671/0272-4634(2003)023[0575:RBEAID]2.0.CO;2.
- Vila, Bernat; Díez Díaz, Verónica; Sellés, Albert G.; Le Loeuff, Jean (2023). "On the taxonomy and diversity of the Upper Cretaceous titanosaurian bonebed of Bellevue (France)". Book of Abstracts of the 20th Annual Conference of the European Association of Vertebrate Palaeontologists, 26th June – 1st July 2023. Palaeovertebrata, Special Volume. 1–23: 262. doi:10.18563/pv.eavp2023.
- Vila, Bernat; Díez Díaz, Verónica; Sellés, Albert G.; Adam, G.; Le Loeuff, Jean (2024). "Desentrañando la diversidad taxonómica de los saurópodos titanosaurios del bonebed de Bellevue (Cretácico superior, Francia)" (PDF). Libro de Resúmenes XXXIX Jornadas de la Socieda Española de Paleontología A Coruña 2 a 5 de Octubre 2024. 5: 1–240.
- Vila, Bernat; Galobart, Àngel; Canudo, José Ignacio; Le Loeuff, Jean; Dinarès-Turell, Jaume; Riera, V.; Oms, Oriol; Tortosa, Thierry; Gaete, Rodrigo (2012). "The diversity of sauropod dinosaurs and their first taxonomic succession from the latest Cretaceous of southwestern Europe: Clues to demise and extinction". Palaeogeography, Palaeoclimatology, Palaeoecology. 350–352: 19–38. doi:10.1016/j.palaeo.2012.06.008.
- Vila, Bernat; Sellés, Albert G.; Beetschen, Jean-Claude (2017). "The controversial Les Labadous eggshells: A new and peculiar dromaeosaurid (Dinosauria: Theropoda) ootype from the Upper Cretaceous of Europe". Cretaceous Research. 72: 117–123. doi:10.1016/j.cretres.2016.12.010.
- Vila, Bernat; Sellés, Albert G.; Moreno-Azanza, Miguel; Razzolini, Novella L.; Gil-Delgado, Alejandro; Canudo, José Ignacio; Galobart, Àngel (2022). "A titanosaurian sauropod with Gondwanan affinities in the latest Cretaceous of Europe". Nature Ecology & Evolution. 6: 288–296. Bibcode:2022NatEE...6..288V. doi:10.1038/s41559-021-01651-5. PMID 35132183. S2CID 246650381.

=== Other vertebrates ===
- Blanco, Alejandro (2021). "Importance of the postcranial skeleton in eusuchian phylogeny: Reassessing the systematics of allodaposuchid crocodylians". PLoS ONE. 16 (6) e0251900. doi:10.1371/journal.pone.0251900. PMC 8189472. PMID 34106925.
- Buffetaut, Eric (1998). "Ptérosaures et oiseaux du Crétacé supérieur de l'Aude". Bulletin de la Société d'Études Scientifiques de l'Aude (in French). 98: 11–17.
- Buffetaut, Eric (2008). "Late Cretaceous pterosaurs from France: a review" (PDF). Zitteliana, Series B. 28: 249–255. doi:10.5282/ubm/epub.12020.
- Cavin, Lionel; Buffetaut, Eric; Dutour, Yves; Garcia, Géraldine; Le Loeuff, Jean; Méchin, Annie; Méchin, Patrick; Tong, Haiyan; Tortosa, Thierry; Turini, Eric; Valentin, Xavier (2020). "The last known freshwater coelacanths: New Late Cretaceous mawsoniids remains (Osteichthyes: Actinistia) from Southern France". PLoS ONE. 15 (6) e0234183. doi:10.1371/journal.pone.0234183. PMC 7274394. PMID 32502171.
- Gaffney, Eugene S.; Tong, Haiyan; Meylan, Peter A. (2006). "Evolution of the side-necked turtles: the families Bothremydidae, Euraxemydidae, and Araripemydidae". Bulletin of the American Museum of Natural History. 300: 1–698.
- Martin, J.; Delfino, M.; Garcia, G.; Godefroit, P.; Berton, S.; Valentin, X. (2016). "New specimens of Allodaposuchus precedens from France: intraspecific variability and the diversity of European Late Cretaceous eusuchians". Zoological Journal of the Linnean Society. 176: 607–631. doi:10.1111/zoj.12331.
- Narváez, Iván; Brochu, Christopher A.; Escaso, Fernando; Pérez-García, Adán; Ortega, Francisco (2017). "Analysis and phylogenetic status of the eusuchian fragmentary material from Western Europe assigned to Allodaposuchus precedens". Journal of Iberian Geology. 43 (2): 345–361. doi:10.1007/s41513-017-0025-3.
- Puértolas-Pascual, Eduardo; Blanco, Alejandro; Brochu, Christopher A.; Canudo, José Ignacio (2016). "Review of the Late Cretaceous-early Paleogene crocodylomorphs of Europe: Extinction patterns across the K-PG boundary". Cretaceous Research. 57: 565–590. doi:10.1016/j.cretres.2015.08.002.
- Puértolas-Pascual, Eduardo; Canudo, José Ignacio; Vila, Bernat; Blanco, Alejandro; Marmi, Josep (2013). "Allodaposuchus remains from the Upper Cretaceous of Europe: new crocodylimorph discoveries". Programme and Abstracts of the 61st Symposium on Vertebrate Palaeontology and Comparative Anatomy, 27th June – 30th August 2013. Edinburgh: 61.
- Tong, Haiyan; Tortosa, Thierry; Buffetaut, Eric; Dutour, Yves; Turini, Eric; Claude, Julien (2022). "A compsemydid turtle from the Upper Cretaceous of Var, southern France". Annales de Paléontologie. 108 (1) 102536. doi:10.1016/j.annpal.2022.102536.

=== Plants ===
- Philippe, Marc (2003). "Les bois fossiles du gisement de Bellevue". La Lettre de Dinosauria (in French). 22: 4.

== Books ==
- Buffetaut, Eric (1995). "Les dinosaures du Crétacé supérieur". In Buffetaut, E. (ed.). Dinosaures de France (in French). BRGM. pp. 101–131. ISBN 2-7159-0766-4.
- Chanthasit, Phornphen (2010). The ornithopod dinosaur Rhabdodon from the Late Cretaceous of France: anatomy, systematics and paleobiology (PhD thesis). Université Claude Bernard.
- Laurent, Yves; Le Loeuff, J.; Bilotte, M.; Buffetaut, E.; Odin, G.S. (2001). "Campanian-Maastrichtian continental-marine connection in the Aquitaine-Pyrenees-Provence area (S France)". In Odin, G.S. (ed.). The Campanian-Maastrichtian Stage Boundary, Characterisation at Tercis les Bains (France) and Correlation with Europe and other Continents. Amsterdam: Elsevier. pp. 657–674. ISBN 978-0-444-50647-4.
- Le Loeuff, Jean (2005). "Osteology of Ampelosaurus atacis (Titanosauria) from Southern France". In Tidwell, V.; Carpenter, K. (eds.). Thunder-Lizards: The Sauropodomorph Dinosaurs. Bloomington: Indiana University Press. pp. 115–137. ISBN 978-0-253-34542-4.

== See also ==
- List of dinosaur-bearing rock formations
  - List of stratigraphic units with dinosaur trace fossils
    - Dinosaur eggs
