= Nichkesaisk Formation =

Campanian geologic formation in Kyrgyzstan

- Stratigraphic range: Early Campanian; ~75 Ma
- Type: Geological formation

Lithology
- Primary: Claystone

Location
- Coordinates: 41.2°N 71.3°E
- Approximate paleocoordinates: 34.9°N 64.7°E
- Region: Jalal-Abad
- Country: Kyrgyzstan
- Extent: Fergana Valley
- Nichkesaisk Formation (Kyrgyzstan)

The Nichkesaisk or Nichkesai Formation is an early Campanian geologic formation in Kyrgyzstan. Fossil dinosaur eggs have been reported from the formation.

== See also ==
- List of dinosaur-bearing rock formations
  - List of stratigraphic units with dinosaur trace fossils
    - Dinosaur eggs
