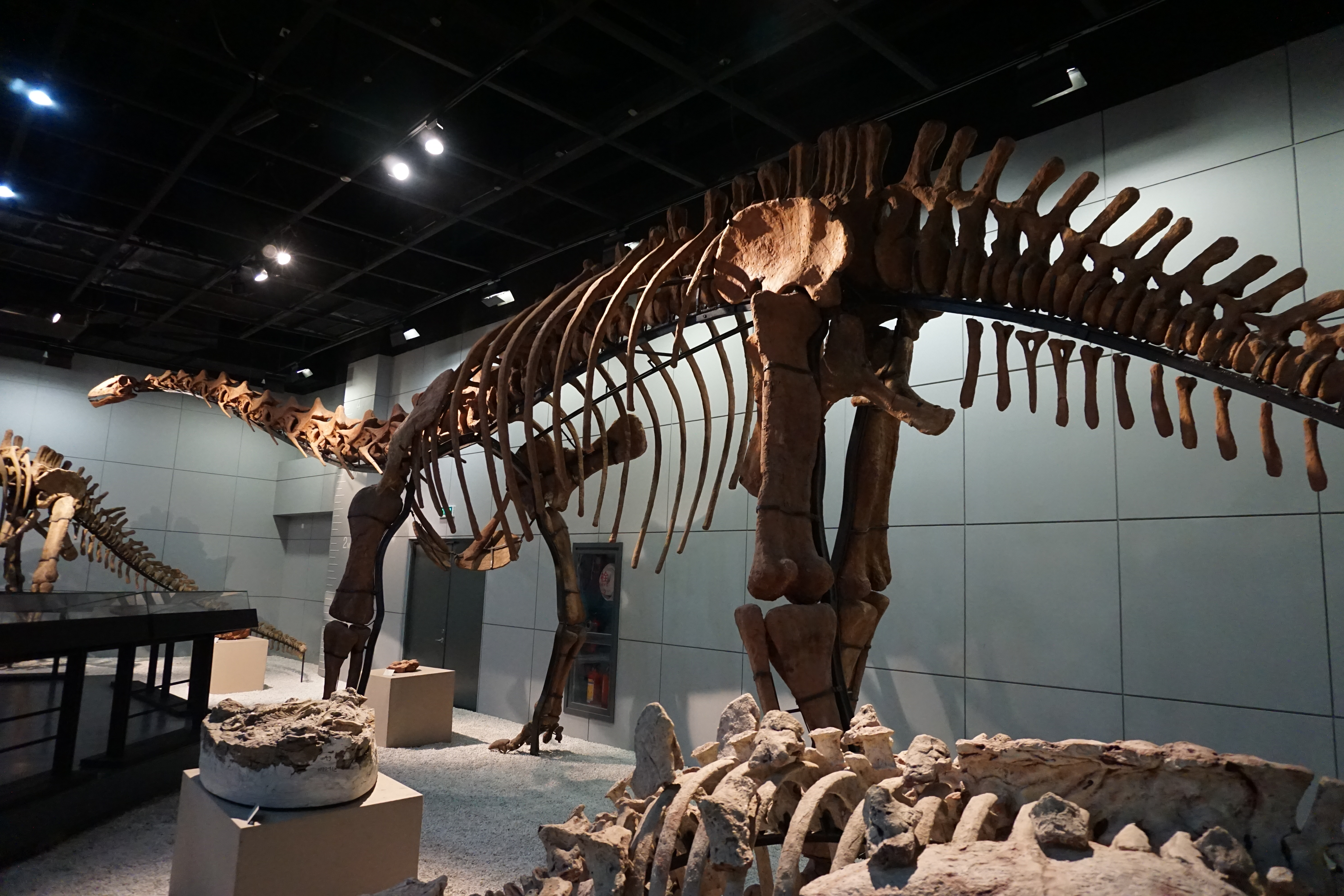
- Skeletal mount

Scientific classification
- Kingdom: Animalia
- Phylum: Chordata
- Class: Reptilia
- Clade: Dinosauria
- Clade: Saurischia
- Clade: †Sauropodomorpha
- Clade: †Sauropoda
- Clade: †Macronaria
- Clade: †Titanosauriformes
- Genus: †Jiangshanosaurus
- Species: †J. lixianensis

Binomial name
- †Jiangshanosaurus lixianensis Tang et al., 2001

= Jiangshanosaurus =

Jiangshanosaurus Temporal range: Late Cretaceous, ~92–88 Ma

Extinct genus of dinosaurs

Jiangshanosaurus is a genus of herbivorous titanosauriform sauropod dinosaur that lived in China approximately 92-88 million years ago, during the Turonian and Coniacian stages of the Late Cretaceous.

== Discovery and naming ==
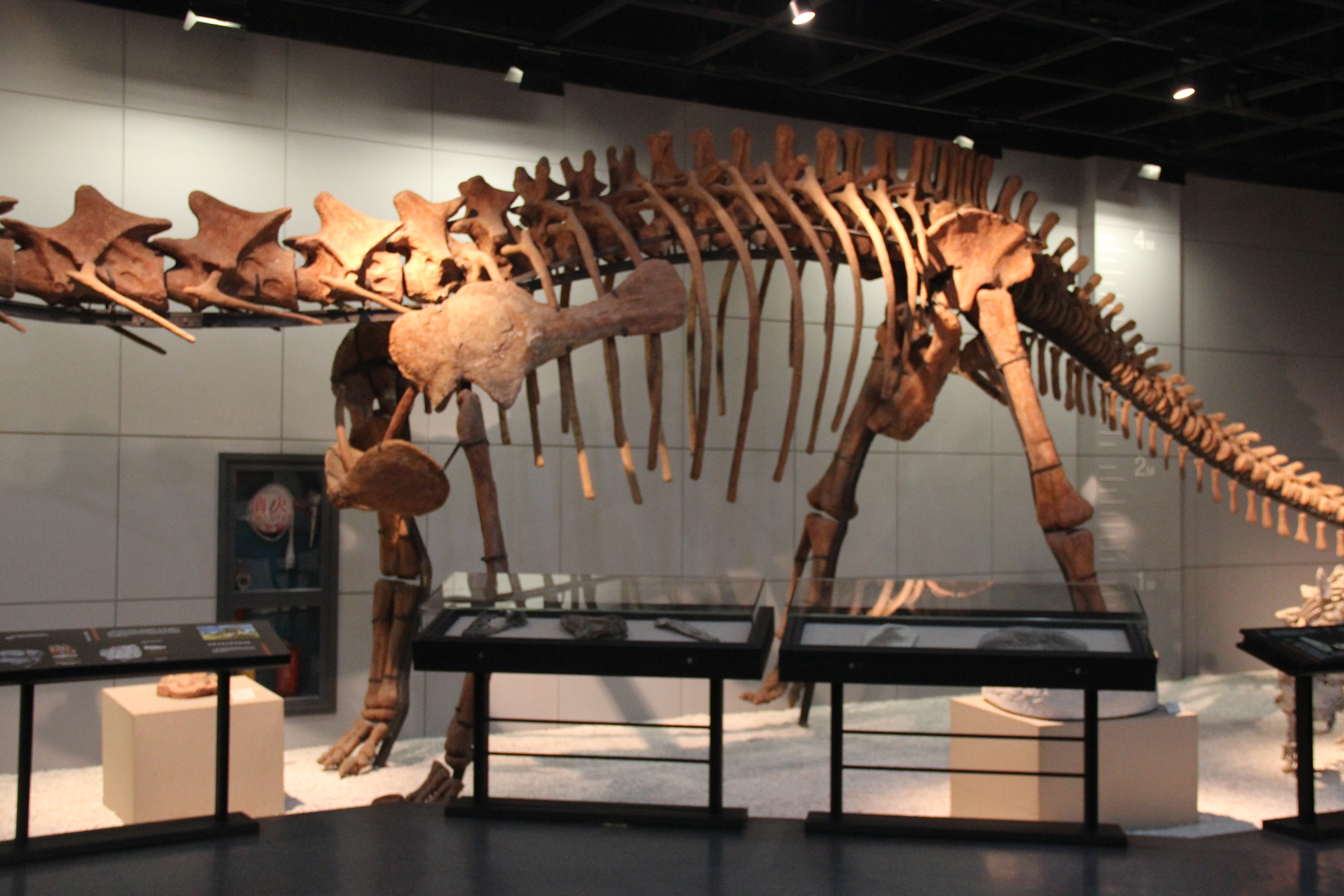
Closer view of body

In 1977 and 1978 a sauropod skeleton was excavated by paleontologists Wei Feng, Wu Weitang and Kang Ximin in the Jinhua Formation of Lixian Village, Jiangshan county, in the eastern Chinese province of Zhejiang.

The type and only named species, Jiangshanosaurus lixianensis, was formally described by Tang Feng, Kang, Jin Xingsheng, Wei and Wu in 2001. The holotype, ZNM M1322, of J. lixianensis includes elements of the left shoulder, five back vertebrae, three tail vertebrae, the pubic bones, the ischia, and a left femur. The genus name refers to Jiangshan County; the specific name refers to the village of Lixian.

In 2019, Philip Mannion e.a. redescribed the holotype.

== Description ==
=== Size ===
According to paleontologist Thomas R. Holtz Jr. the exact size of this sauropod cannot be determined. Gregory S. Paul estimated its length at eleven meters and its weight at 2500 kg.

=== Distinguishing traits ===
In 2019, Mannion e.a. indicated two distinguishing traits. They were autapomorphies, unique derived characters. In the vertebrae positioned at the transition between the tail base and the middle tail, the lower ends of the laminae spinoprezygapophyseales, the ridges running from the neural spine towards the front articulation processes, are placed to the inside of these processes, the prezygapophyses, instead of touching them. The lower shaft of the ischium ends in a small process, formed as a hook, on its top outer side.

== Phylogeny ==
Although Jiangshanosaurus initially defied precise placement within Titanosauria, in 2017 paper considered it to be outside Lithostrotia.

According to the 2019 study, Jiangshanosaurus was placed in the Somphospondyli in a basal position, outside the Titanosauria.
