= Quxian Formation =

Geologic formation in China

- Stratigraphic range: Santonian-Campanian; ~85–75 Ma
- Type: Geological formation
- Unit of: Qujiang Group
- Underlies: Unconformity: Tongxiang Formation
- Overlies: Jinhua Formation

Lithology
- Primary: Red or variegated sandstone
- Other: Conglomerate

Location
- Coordinates: 28.7°N 118.5°E
- Approximate paleocoordinates: 31.0°N 112.4°E
- Region: Zhejiang Province
- Country: China
- Quxian Formation (China)

The Quxian Formation is a Santonian to Campanian geologic formation in China. Fossil dinosaur eggs have been reported from the formation. It is a unit of the Qujiang Group and dates to the Santonian through early Campanian.

== See also ==
- List of dinosaur-bearing rock formations
  - List of stratigraphic units with dinosaur trace fossils
    - Dinosaur eggs
