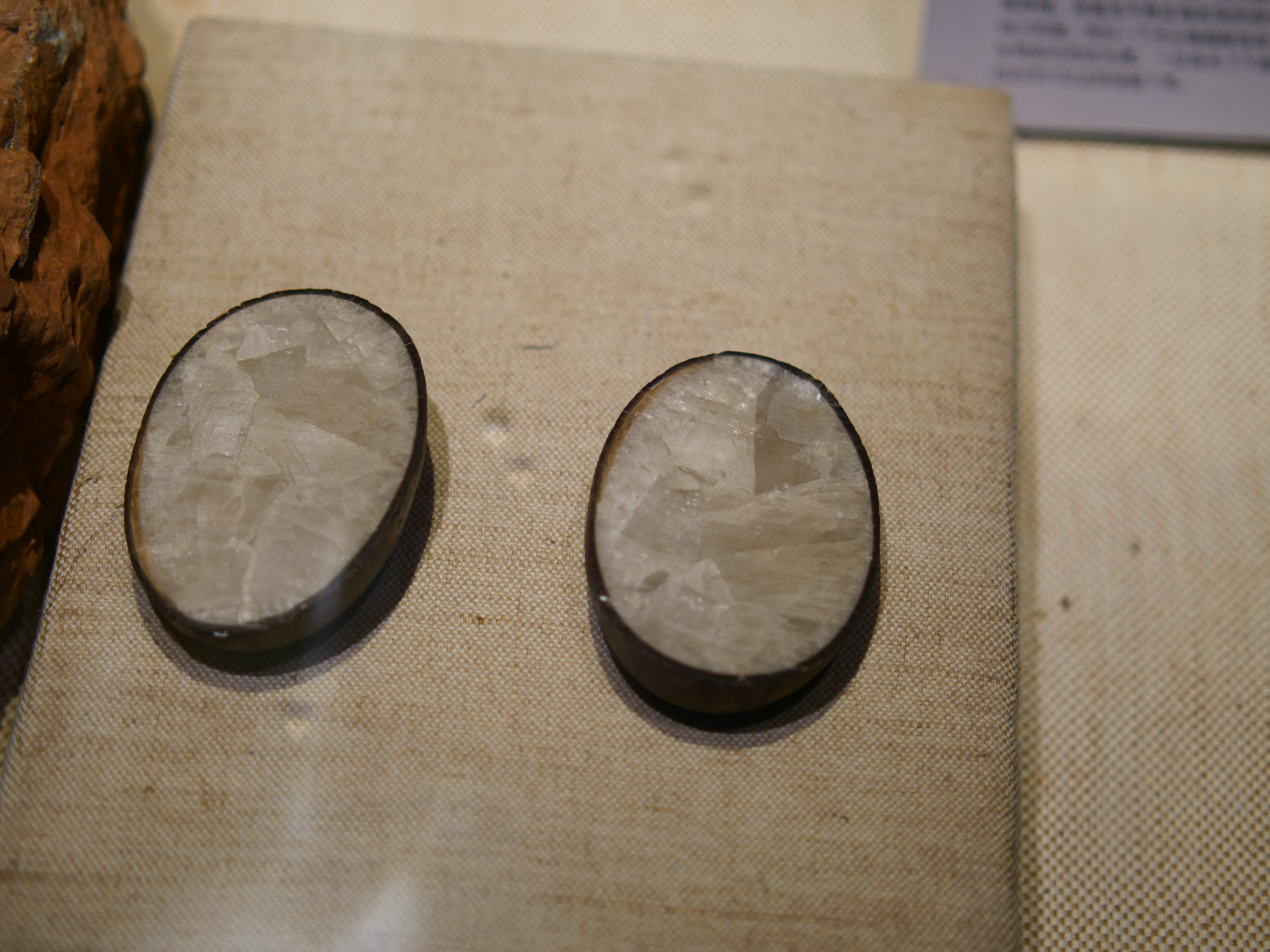
- Ovaloolithus chinkangkouensis, on display at the Paleozoological Museum of China.

Egg fossil classification
- Basic shell type: †Dinosauroid-spherulitic
- Oofamily: †Ovaloolithidae
- Oogenus: †Ovaloolithus; Zhao, 1979

= Ovaloolithus =

Ovaloolithus Temporal range: Late Cretaceous ~96–66 Ma

Dinosaur egg

Ovaloolithus is an oogenus of dinosaur egg. Eggs of the genus have been found in China, Mongolia and Utah.

== Species ==
Oospecies attributed to this genus include:

- O. chinkangkouensis - Cenomanian-Santonian Bayan Shireh Formation, Mongolia, Campanian Jingangkou Formation (Wangshi Group), China
- O. dinornithoides - Maastrichtian Nemegt Formation, Mongolia
- O. laminadermus - Campanian Jingangkou Formation (Wangshi Group), China
- O. tenuisus - Maastrichtian (Lancian) North Horn Formation, Utah
- O. turpanensis - Campanian-Maastrichtian Subashi Formation, China
- O. utahensis - Maastrichtian (Lancian) North Horn Formation, Utah
- Ovaloolithus sp. - Coniacian-Santonian Zhaoying Formation, Cenomanian-Turonian Chichengshan Formation (Tiantai Group) and Turonian Majiacun Formation, China
- O. huangtulingensis
- O. mixistriatus
- O. monostriatus
- O. sangpingensis
- O. tristriatus
- O. weiqiaoensis

== See also ==
- List of dinosaur oogenera
