= Paradictyoolithus =

Paradictyoolithus Temporal range: Upper Cretaceous

Egg fossil classification
- Basic shell type: †Dinosauroid-spherulitic
- Oofamily: †Dictyoolithidae
- Oogenus: †Paradictyoolithus; Wang et al., 2013

Oospecies
- †P. zhuangqianensis Wang et al., 2013 (type); †P. xiaxishanensis Wang et al., 2013

Dinosaur egg

Paradictyoolithus is an oogenus of dictyoolithid dinosaur egg from the Zhejiang Province, China. They are nearly spherical eggs, measuring up to 13.9 cm (5.5 in) in diameter, and have a thin eggshell. Their shells are made up of three or four superimposed layers of eggshell units. The two known oospecies are distinguished mainly by their pore structure.

== Distribution ==
Both Paradictyoolithus oospecies are from the Chichengshan Formation in Tiantai County, Zhejiang, China. This formation was determined to be 91 to 94 million years old (early Upper Cretaceous) by Uranium–lead dating.

== Discovery ==
Prior to 2013, descriptions of dictyoolithids were brief due to the scarcity of material. However, in 2013 the Chinese paleontologists Wang Qiang, Zhao Zi-Kui, Wang Xiao-Lin, Zhang Shu-Kang from the Chinese Academy of Sciences working together with Jiang Yan-Gen from the Tiantai Bureau of Land and Resources of Zhejiang Province, described several new dictyoolithid specimens, including both oospecies of Paradictyoolithus.

== Description ==
Paradictyoolithus eggs are roughly spherical, measuring 10.8–13.9 cm (4.3–5.5 in) in diameter. Their eggshell is thin, measuring only 1.8 to 2.2 mm thick (compared to 2.5 to 2.8 mm in its close relative, Dictyoolithus). The shell consists of three or four layers of superimposed eggshell units. A radial cross section of the eggshell reveals the net-like (or reticulate) arrangement of the eggshell units, typical of dictyoolithid eggs. The shell units are slender and irregularly shaped.

Paradictyoolithus contains two oospecies: P. zhuangqianensis and P. xiaxishanensis. The two oospecies are primarily distinguished by their pore structure. P. zhuangqianensis has pores which all connect to each other in irregular patterns; the walls of the pores are separated into disconnected blocks. P. xiaxishanensis, on the other hand, has well-separated pore canals which look like a honeycomb in cross-section. Also, P. zhuangqianensis is slightly larger than P. xiaxishanensis, but has a thinner shell.

A fossilized egg clutch containing six eggs and an egg impression reveals that P. xiaxishanensis eggs were arranged irregularly in their nest. The only known clutch of P. zhuangqiensis is not well enough preserved to determine how the nest was organized.
