= Grès d'Alet =

Geologic formation in southern France

- Stratigraphic range: Campanian
- Type: Geological formation
- Underlies: Marnes Rouges Inferieures Formation
- Overlies: Marnes rouges de Campagne
- Thickness: Less than 10 m

Lithology
- Primary: Sandstone

Location
- Coordinates: 43.1°N 1.4°E
- Approximate paleocoordinates: 34.8°N 1.5°E
- Region: Midi Pyrénees
- Country: France
- Grès d'Alet (France)

The Grès d'Alet is a Campanian geologic formation in southern France. Fossil dinosaur eggs have been reported from the formation.

== See also ==
- List of dinosaur-bearing rock formations
  - List of stratigraphic units with dinosaur trace fossils
    - Dinosaur eggs
