= Dictyoolithidae =

Dictyoolithidae Temporal range: Cretaceous

Egg fossil classification
- Basic shell type: †Dinosauroid-spherulitic
- Oofamily: †Dictyoolithidae; Zhao, 1994

Oogenera
- Dictyoolithus; Protodictyoolithus; Paradictyoolithus

Oogenus of dinosaur egg

Dictyoolithidae is an oofamily of dinosaur eggs which have a distinctive reticulate organization of their eggshell units. They are so far known only from Cretaceous formations in China.

== Distribution ==
All known dictyoolithids are known from the Cretaceous of China; they have been found in Henan, Zhejiang, and Shandong, from the Liuyemiao Formation, the Zhaoying Formation, Chichengshan Formation, and the Wangshi Group.

== History ==
Dictyoolithidae was first described in 1994 by the Chinese paleontologist Zhao Zikui; he named only a single oogenus, Dictyoolithus, with two oospecies: D. neixiangensis and D. hongpoensis. Because excavations were still going on at the time, however, Zhao did not provide a detailed description. After that, dictyoolithids received little attention in the scientific literature because of the rarity of their fossils.

However, in 2013 Chinese paleontologists Wang Qiang, Zhao Zikui, Wang Xiaolin, Zhang Shukang, and Jiang Yan'gen discovered new remains and did a comprehensive reanalysis of the oofamily. The split Dictyoolithus into two oogenera: Dictyoolithus and Protodictyoolithus, as well as adding a new oogenus, Paradictyoolithus, based on newly discovered remains. One oospecies, "D." gongzhulingensis, was moved to an entirely different oofamily and reclassified as an oospecies of Similifaveoloolithus.

== Description ==
Dictyoolithid eggs are spherical or oval in shape. The outer surface is smooth or covered with low nodes. The eggshell units and pore canals are irregularly shaped. Dictyoolithids are unique for having a reticulate-like organization of eggshell units, which resembles the honeycomb-like structure of faveoloolithids. The eggshell units are branching, and superimposed in multiple layers throughout the eggshell. However, in 2010, Jin et al. argued that superimposed shell units were not universal to the oofamily because they had discovered three fossil egg clutches, referred to D. hongpoensis, in Lishui, Zhejiang which lacked this characteristic. However, the identification of these eggs as dictyoolithids is disputed; they may in fact represent Faveoloolithidae, an oofamily which is similar in microstructure to Dictyoolithidae.

== Paleobiology ==
It is unknown what kind of dinosaur laid dictyoolithid eggs, because they have not been associated with embryos or skeletal remains. A phylogenetic analysis in 2010, based on the remains from Lishui that possibly belong to Dictyoolithus hongpoensis, found it to be the eggs of theropods. Similarly, a cladistic analysis by Sellés and Galobart in 2015 found Dictyoolithus to be a theropod egg more basal than Prismatoolithidae, Elongatoolithidae, and avian eggs, so they considered it to be the eggs of a megalosauroid.

=== Eggshell formation ===
Dinosaur eggshells formed in two different ways: Spheroolithidae, Dendroolithidae, and Elongatoolithidae had eggs forming similar to those of birds, with the membrane forming before the hard, calcareous part of the shell. On the other hand, in Dictyoolithidae and Faveoloolithidae, the membrane and calcareous parts of the eggshell formed simultaneously.

== Parataxonomy ==
Under the basic type and morphotype system of classification for fossil eggs, dictyoolithids are classified in an unnamed morphotype in the dinosauroid-spherulitic basic type. However, morphotypes and basic types are not normally used in modern research as they are often redundant and uninformative.

Dictyoolithidae contains three oogenera: Dictyoolithus, Paradictyoolithus, and Protodictyoolithus. Stromatoolithus has also been classified as a dictyoolithid, but due to its very brief description comparison is difficult.
