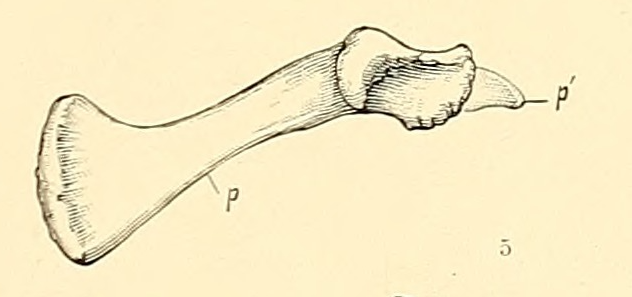
- Pubis of Laosaurus (unknown species; possibly L. celer) in 1896

Scientific classification
- Kingdom: Animalia
- Phylum: Chordata
- Class: Reptilia
- Clade: Dinosauria
- Clade: †Ornithischia
- Clade: †Pyrodontia
- Genus: †Laosaurus; Marsh, 1878

Type species
- †Laosaurus celer Marsh, 1878

Species
- †L. celer Marsh, 1878 (type) (nomen dubium); †L. gracilis Marsh, 1878 (nomen dubium); †L. minimus Gilmore, 1924 (nomen dubium)

= Laosaurus =

Laosaurus Temporal range: Kimmeridgian, 154–152 Ma

Extinct genus of dinosaurs

Laosaurus (meaning "stone or fossil lizard") is a genus of neornithischian dinosaur. The type species, Laosaurus celer, was first described by O.C. Marsh in 1878 from remains discovered in the Upper Jurassic (Kimmeridgian) Morrison Formation of Wyoming. The validity of this genus is doubtful because it is based on fragmentary fossils. A second species also from the Morrison Formation, L. gracilis, and a species from the Upper Cretaceous Allison Formation of Alberta, Canada, L. minimus, are also considered dubious.

== History and taxonomy ==
Marsh (1878a) named his new genus from vertebrae (YPM 1874) found by Samuel Wendell Williston at Como Bluff, Wyoming, from rocks of the Morrison Formation. The type material includes nine partial and two complete tail vertebral centra, which he concluded came from a "fox-sized" animal. In the same year, he named two other species: L. gracilis, originally based on a back vertebral centrum, a tail vertebral centrum, and part of an ulna; and L. altus, originally based on a pelvis, hindlimb, and tooth (YPM 1876). A review by Peter Galton in 1983 found the type of L. gracilis to consist of thirteen back and eight tail centra, and portions of both hindlimbs. Charles Gilmore had assigned additional remains, including a partial skeleton (CM 11340), to L. gracilis based on size, but Galton transferred the remains to other taxa, assigning the skeleton to Dryosaurus. Marsh returned to the genus in 1894, when additional remains convinced him that L. altus deserved its own genus (Dryosaurus), and that there was another species present: L. consors, based on YPM 1882, a partial skeleton also from Como Bluff. In 1895, he coined the family Laosauridae for his genus, but this was eventually considered synonymous with Hypsilophodontidae.

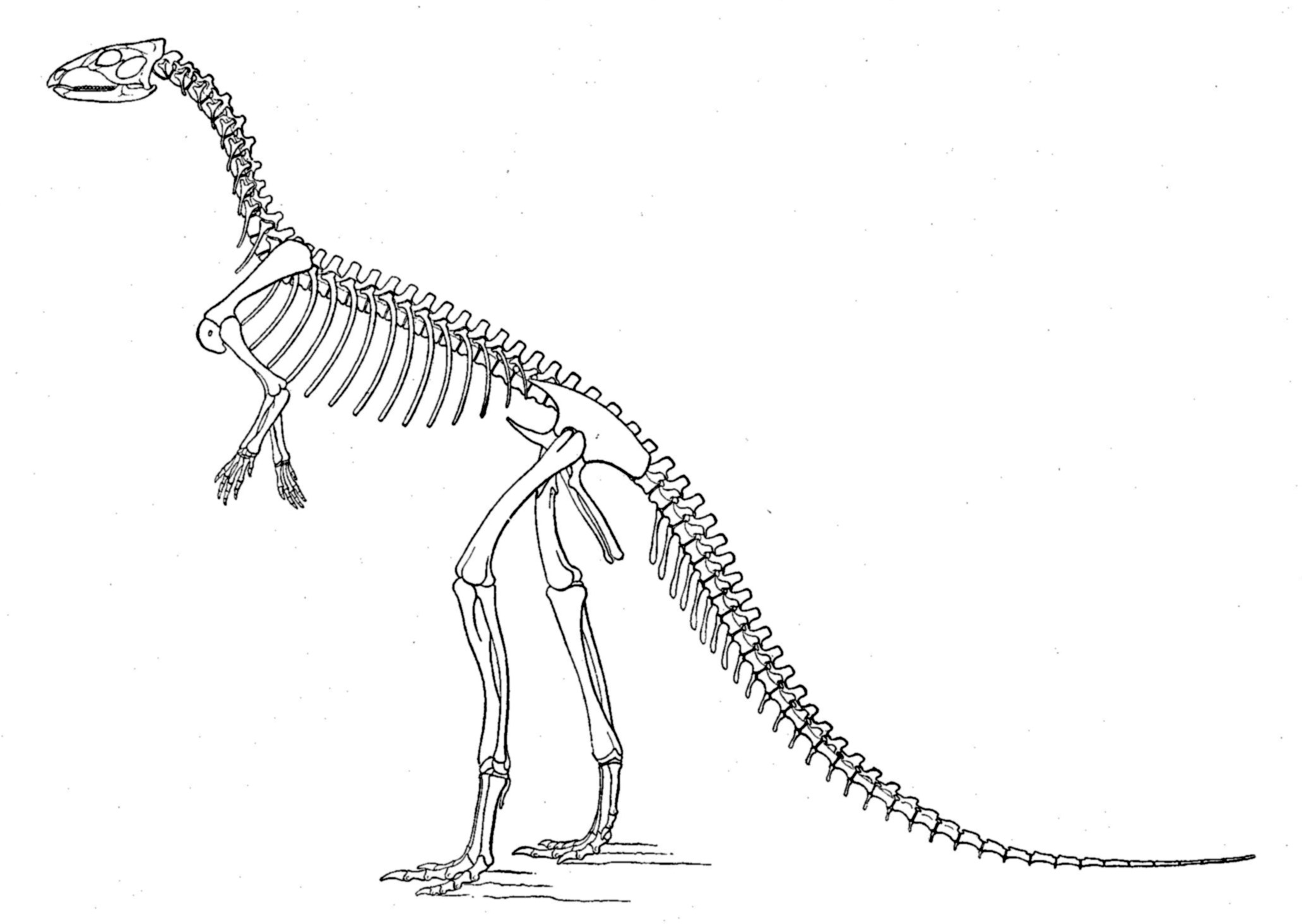
Othniel Charles Marsh's 1896 skeletal restoration of "Laosaurus" consors (now Nanosaurus).

Charles Gilmore in 1909 assigned a juvenile femur (USNM 5808) to L. gracilis, and in 1925 added partial skeleton CM 11340 to L. gracilis, based on size, but Galton transferred the femur to Othnielia (now Nanosaurus) and the skeleton to Dryosaurus in 1983. Gilmore also described the fifth and final species, L. minimus (species name for its small size), based on NMC 9438, a partial left hindlimb and vertebral bits from the Late Cretaceous (late Campanian) Allison Formation of Alberta, Canada. At the time, though, the discovery locality was thought to be in the Early Cretaceous Blairmore Group, but fieldwork at the L. minimus type locality in the early 1930s showed it to be within the Belly River Group, and Loris Russell published a paper in 1949 recognizing this new geologic information, while finding it generically distinct from Laosaurus proper. Russell found this taxon to be most like Hypsilophodon, from the Early Cretaceous Wessex Formation of southern England.

The next major publications which mentioned Laosaurus prominently were by Galton. In 1977, he assigned L. consors and L. gracilis to his new taxon Othnielia rex; and in 1983 he redescribed most of the material and reassigned some of it, as described above. Galton (1983) is also one of the sources for the "Troodon as carnivorous ornithopod" hypothesis of the early 1980s, because it assigns L. minimus to Troodon, based on unpublished evidence. This would tie in with the Orodromeus/Troodon egg confusion of a few years later, which was eventually settled as Troodon individuals eating Orodromeus individuals at their nesting site (the troodontid embryoes were confused with hypsilophodont embryos). L. celer was assessed as dubious by Galton, a status it has kept through the last major reviews.

Two further developments have occurred. First, L. minimus is seen as a possible second species or specimen of Orodromeus (Sues and Norman, 1990), although the remains are too meager to be certain. Second, Galton, in a 2007 review, declared Othnielia rex to be based on undiagnostic remains, and shifted diagnostic referred remains to new taxon Othnielosaurus consors, a new combination based on the original L. consors partial skeleton.

=== Taxonomic summary ===
- L. celer (type species) = dubious ornithischian
- L. altus = Dryosaurus altus
- L. consors = Othnielosaurus consors, now considered a junior synonym of Nanosaurus agilis
- L. gracilis = dubious ornithishian
- L. minimus = dubious ornithischian, possibly orodromine
