= Khodzhaosmansk Formation =

Aptian to Albian geologic formation in Kyrgyzstan

- Stratigraphic range: Aptian-Albian; ~120–100 Ma
- Type: Geological formation

Location
- Coordinates: 41.8°N 75.5°E
- Approximate paleocoordinates: 38.4°N 77.8°E
- Region: Jalal-Abad, Naryn
- Country: Kyrgyzstan
- Extent: Fergana Valley
- Khodzhaosmansk Formation (Kyrgyzstan)

The Khodzhaosmansk or Khodzhaosman Formation is an Aptian to Albian geologic formation in Kyrgyzstan. Dinosaur remains and fossil dinosaur eggs have been reported from the formation.

== Fossil content ==
The following fossils have been reported from the formation:

- Hadrosauridae indet
- Choristodera indet
- Ornithischia indet

== See also ==
- List of dinosaur-bearing rock formations
  - List of stratigraphic units with dinosaur trace fossils
    - Dinosaur eggs
