= Sigou Formation =

Geologic formation in China

- Stratigraphic range: Late Cretaceous
- Type: Geological formation
- Overlies: Majiacun Formation

Location
- Region: Henan, Hubei
- Country: China
- Extent: Xixia Basin

The Sigou Formation is a Late Cretaceous geologic formation in China. Fossil dinosaur eggs have been reported from the formation, including Dictyoolithus.

== See also ==
- List of dinosaur-bearing rock formations
  - List of stratigraphic units with dinosaur trace fossils
    - Dinosaur eggs
