= Dictyoolithus =

Dictyoolithus Temporal range: Cretaceous

Egg fossil classification
- Basic shell type: †Dinosauroid-spherulitic
- Oofamily: †Dictyoolithidae
- Oogenus: †Dictyoolithus; Zhao, 1994

Type oospecies
- †Dictyoolithus hongpoensis Zhao, 1994

Dinosaur egg

Dictyoolithus is an oogenus of dinosaur egg from the Cretaceous of China. It is notable for having over five superimposed layers of eggshell units. Possibly, it was laid by megalosauroid dinosaurs.

== Distribution ==
Dictyoolithus is known from Hongpo, a town in Xixia County, Henan. This is in the Lower Cretaceous Sigou Formation. It has also been discovered in Lishui, Zhejiang, in the Upper Cretaceous Chichengshan Formation.

== History ==
Dictyoolithus was first discovered and described in 1994 by Chinese paleontologist and pioneer of fossil eggshell classification, Zhao Zikui. He named two oospecies: D. hongpoensis and D. neixiangensis (now Protodictyoolithus neixiangensis). However, since excavations were still going on at the time, his description was brief. In 2004, a third oospecies was named, D. jiangi, followed by a fourth, D. gonzhulingensis in 2006. However, in 2013 Chinese paleontologists Wang Qiang, Zhao Zikui, Wang Xiaolin, Zhang Shukang, and Jiang Yan'gen did a reanalysis of the entire oofamily Dictyoolithidae, and split the oogenus Dictyoolithus into two, classifying "D." neixiangensis and "D." jiangi within a new oogenus: Protodictyoolithus. Furthermore, they moved "D." gonzhulingensis into an entirely different oofamily and oogenus, reclassifying it as a member of Similifaveoloolithus.

== Description ==
Dictyoolithus eggs are roughly spherical and measure from 12–16 centimetres (4.7–6.3 in) in diameter. Their eggshell is between 2.5 and 2.8 mm thick. The surface ornamentation is smooth with a grainy texture, or has very low rounded nodes. The eggshell is notable for being composed of more than five superimposed layers of eggshell units. In some specimens, found at Lishui, no superimposed layers of eggshells were found. However, it is not certain that these specimens in fact represent Dictyoolithus. The eggshell units have a reticulate organization.

== Paleobiology ==
Since no embryos or adult remains have been found with Dictyoolithus eggs, it is uncertain what kind of dinosaur laid them. A cladistic analysis in 2010 by Jin et al. found Dictyoolithus to be basal theropod eggs. Similarly, Sellés and Galobart in 2015 found Dictyoolithus to be basal theropods, and considered it to be the eggs of megalosauroids.

Unlike many dinosaur eggs, the calcareous and membranous parts of Dictyoolithus eggshells probably formed simultaneously in the oviduct, as in the modern tuatara.

== Parataxonomy ==
Dictyoolithus is classified in the oofamily Dictyoolithidae, alongside Protodictyoolithus and Paradictyoolithus. It contains only a single oospecies: D. hongpoensis. Mikhailov (1997) suggested that it may actually be a dendroolithid.
