= Zhaoying Formation =

Geologic formation in Henan, China

- Stratigraphic range: Coniacian; ~89–87 Ma
- Type: Geological formation

Lithology
- Primary: Siltstone

Location
- Coordinates: 33.3°N 111.5°E
- Approximate paleocoordinates: 33.1°N 104.0°E
- Region: Henan Province
- Country: China

Type section
- Named for: Zhaoying village
- Zhaoying Formation (China) Zhaoying Formation (Henan)

The Zhaoying Formation is a Coniacian geologic formation in Henan Province, China. Fossil dinosaur eggs of Ovaloolithus sp. have been reported from the formation.

== See also ==
- List of dinosaur-bearing rock formations
  - List of stratigraphic units with dinosaur trace fossils
    - Dinosaur eggs
