= Allison Formation =

Canadian geological formation

Coordinates: 49.5997°N 114.1999°W

- Stratigraphic range: Late Cretaceous
- Type: Geological formation

Location
- Region: North America

The Allison Formation is a geological formation in Alberta, Canada whose strata date back to the Late Cretaceous. Dinosaur remains are among the fossils that have been recovered from the formation.

== Paleobiota ==
Color key: Taxon / Reclassified taxon / Taxon falsely reported as present / Dubious taxon or junior synonym / Ichnotaxon / Ootaxon / Morphotaxon	Notes; Uncertain or tentative taxa are in small text; ~~crossed out~~ taxa are discredited.

Dinosaurs of the Allison Formation
Genus	Species	Location	Stratigraphic position	Abundance	Description
Montanoceratops	Indeterminate				
Orodromeus	O. minimus				Originally a species of Laosaurus (L. minimus).

== See also ==
- List of dinosaur-bearing rock formations
