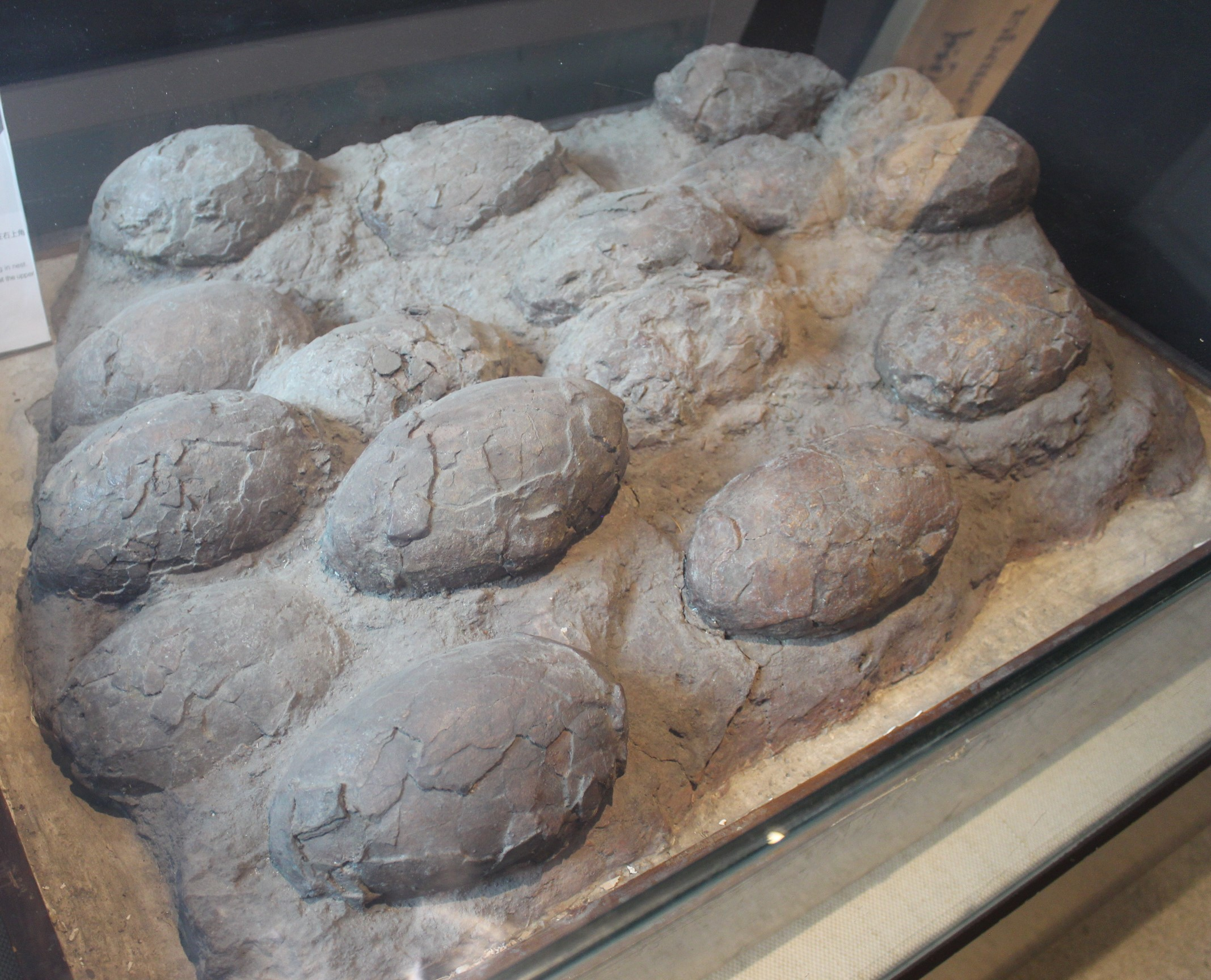
- Nest at Paleozoological Museum of China

Egg fossil classification
- Basic shell type: †Dinosauroid-spherulitic
- Oofamily: †Youngoolithidae; Zhang, 2010
- Oogenus: †Youngoolithus; Zhao, 1979

Oospecies
- †Youngoolithus xiaguanensis

= Youngoolithus =

Youngoolithus Temporal range: Late Cretaceous

Dinosaur egg

Youngoolithus is an oogenus of dinosaur egg. It is the sole member of the oofamily Youngoolithidae, and consists of a single oospecies: Youngoolithus xiaguanensis. It consists of a single fossil nest of 16 eggs with an associated dinosaur footprint that was first discovered in 1975 in the Majiacun Formation near Houzhuang Village, Henan Province, in the Cretaceous Xiaguan Basin. The eggs are smooth, olive-shaped, and arranged in five rows. It was originally described as being a Faveoloolithid egg, however the nest is arranged quite differently than other members of that family, so it has been moved to its own oofamily, Youngoolithidae.
