= Thomas Fork Formation =

Geologic formation in Wyoming, United States

- Stratigraphic range: Albian; ~112–100 Ma
- Type: Geological formation

Lithology
- Primary: Sandstone

Location
- Coordinates: 42.4°N 110.9°W
- Approximate paleocoordinates: 42.4°N 66.7°W
- Region: Wyoming
- Country: United States

Type section
- Named for: Thomas Fork Creek
- Thomas Fork Formation (the United States) Thomas Fork Formation (Wyoming)

The Thomas Fork Formation is an Early Cretaceous (Albian) geologic formation in Wyoming. Fossil dinosaur eggs have been reported from the formation.

== Fossil content ==
The following fossils were reported from the formation:

Vertebrates

- Dinosauria indet.
- Osteichthyes indet.
- Reptilia indet.
- Testudines indet.

Invertebrates

- Bivalves
- Gastropoda indet.

== See also ==
- List of dinosaur-bearing rock formations
  - List of stratigraphic units with dinosaur trace fossils
    - Dinosaur eggs
