= Majiacun Formation =

Late Cretaceous formation in China

- Stratigraphic range: late Coniacian-late Santonian; ~86–85 Ma
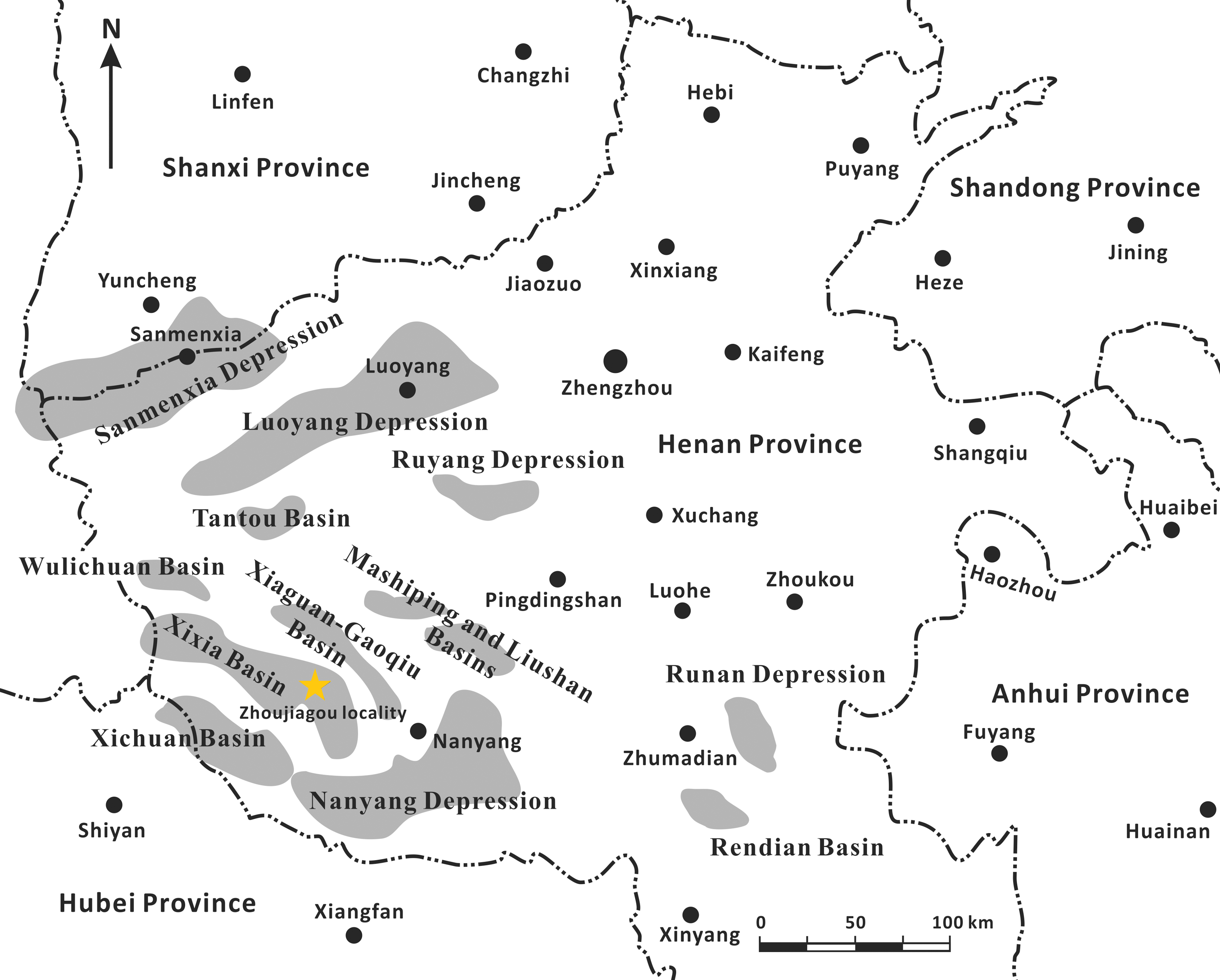
- Location
- Type: Geological formation
- Sub-units: Unit 2
- Underlies: Sigou Formation
- Overlies: Gaogou Formation

Lithology
- Primary: Mudstone, siltstone
- Other: Sandstone, conglomerate

Location
- Coordinates: 33.2°N 111.8°E
- Approximate paleocoordinates: 33.2°N 104.3°E
- Region: Henan, Hubei
- Country: China
- Extent: Xixia Basin
- Majiacun Formation (China) Majiacun Formation (Henan)

The Majiacun Formation is a Santonian to Coniacian geologic formation in China. Dinosaur remains are among the fossils that have been recovered from the formation.

== Paleofauna ==
- Bactrosaurus (remains originally known as Bakesaurus)
- Mosaiceratops azumai
- Xixiasaurus henanensis
- Xixianykus zhangi
- Yunxianosaurus hubeinensis
- Zhanghenglong yangchengensis
- Theropoda indet. (Allosauroidea or Abelisauridae indet.?; originally attributed to Baryonychinae indet.)

Fossil eggs

- Dendroolithus sanlimiaoensis
- Prismatoolithus gebiensis
- Ovaloolithus sp.
- Spheroolithus sp.
- Nanyangosaurus zhugeii
- Youngoolithus xiaguanensis

Ichnofossils

- Scoyenia sp.

== See also ==
- List of dinosaur-bearing rock formations
  - List of stratigraphic units with few dinosaur genera
