= Zoumagang Formation =

Geologic formation in China

- Stratigraphic range: Maastrichtian
- Type: Geological formation

Location
- Country: China
- Extent: Xixia Basin

The Zoumagang Formation is a Maastrichtian age geologic formation in China. Dinosaur remains are among the fossils that have been recovered from the formation, although none have yet been referred to a specific genus.

== See also ==
- List of dinosaur-bearing rock formations
  - List of stratigraphic units with indeterminate dinosaur fossils
