= Eggs as food =

Edible animal product

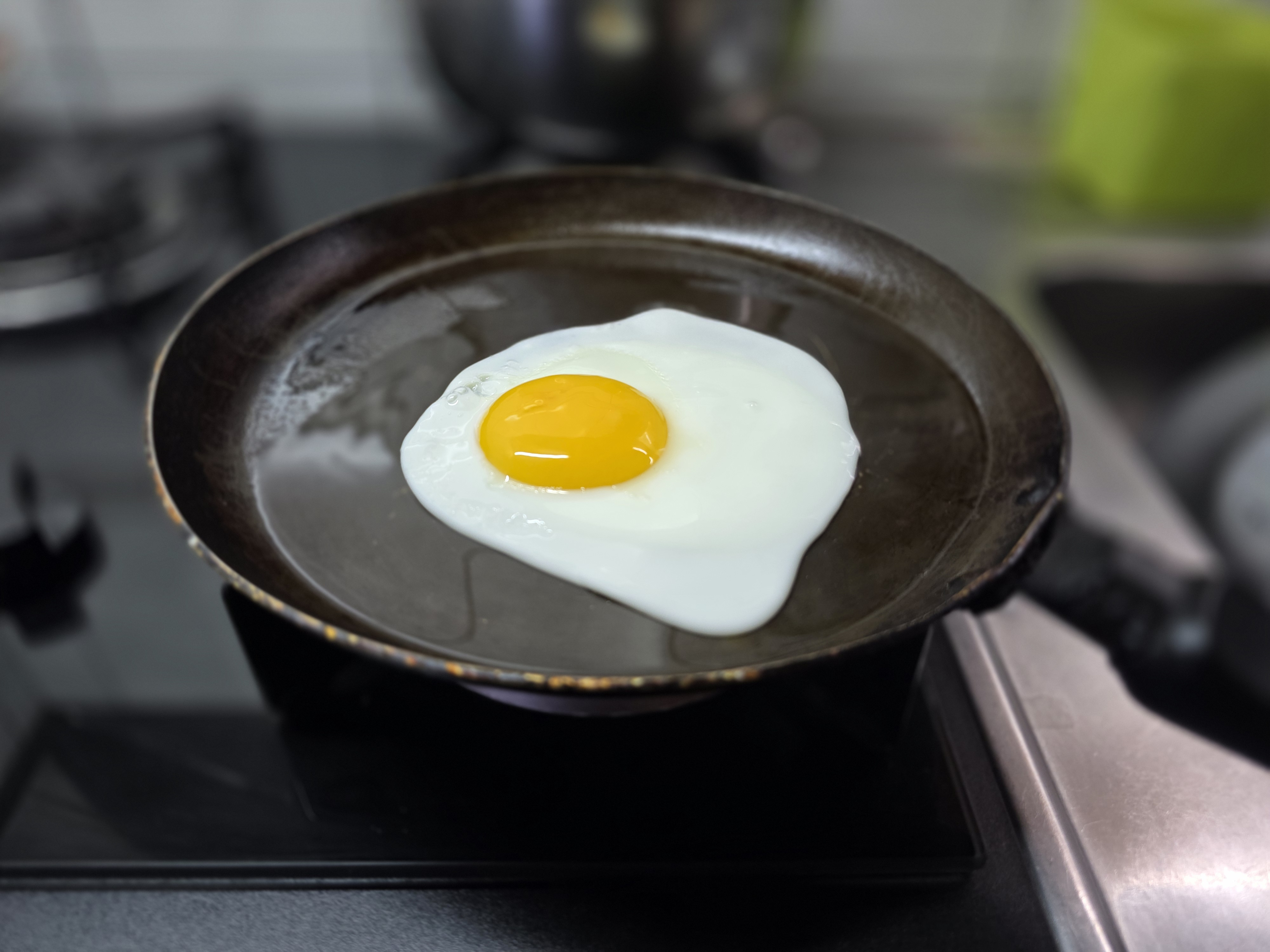
- An egg being fried

Humans and other hominids have consumed eggs for millions of years. The most widely consumed eggs are those of fowl, especially chickens. People in Southeast Asia began harvesting chicken eggs for food around 1500 BCE. Eggs of other birds, such as ducks and ostriches, are eaten regularly but much less commonly than those of chickens. People may also eat the eggs of reptiles, amphibians, and fish. Fish eggs consumed as food are known as roe or caviar.

Hens and other egg-laying creatures are raised throughout the world, and mass production of chicken eggs is a global industry. In 2009, an estimated 62.1 million metric tons of eggs were produced worldwide from a total laying flock of approximately 6.4 billion hens. There are issues of regional variation in demand and expectation, as well as current debates concerning methods of mass production. In 2012, the European Union banned battery husbandry of chickens.

== History ==
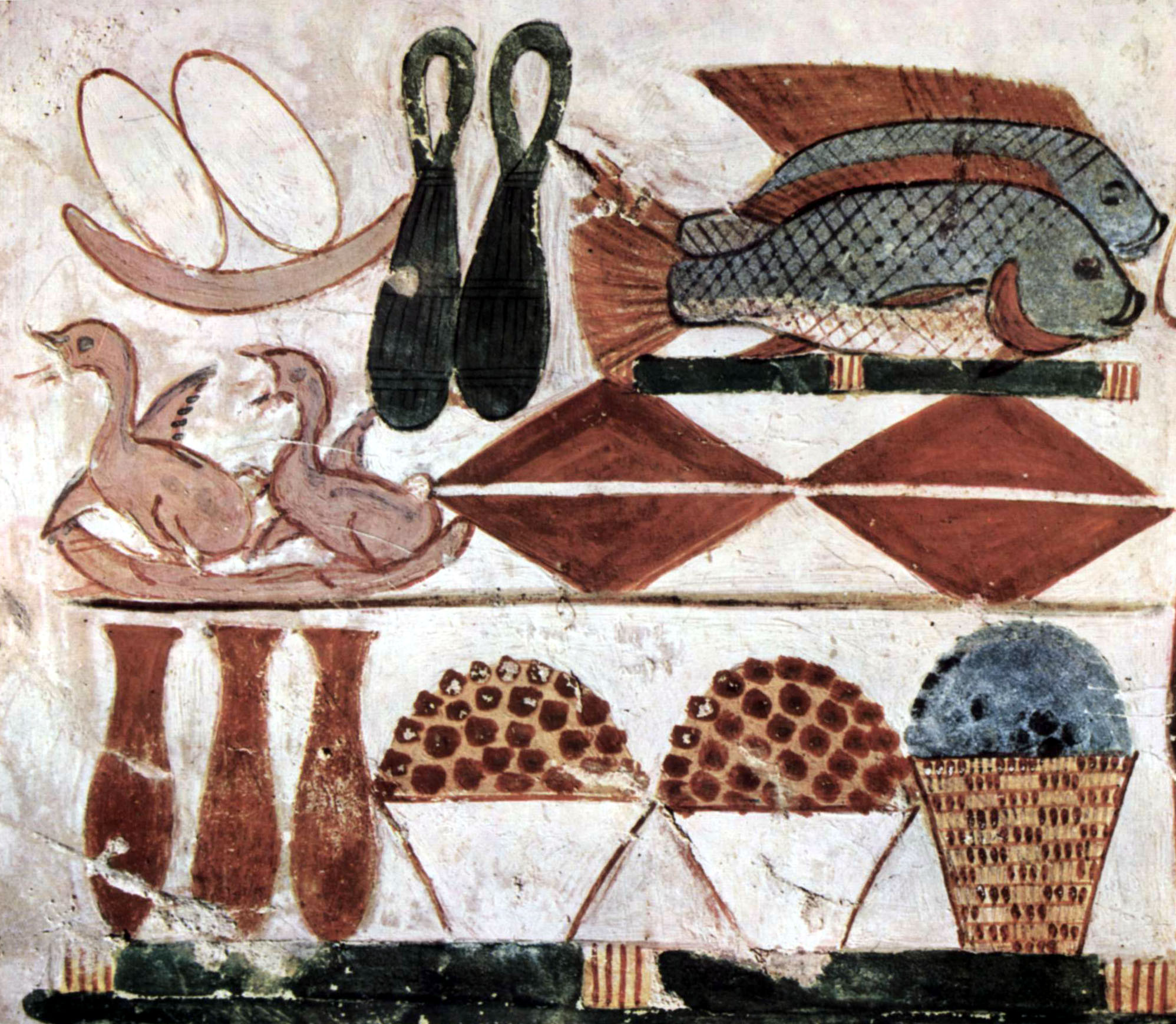
Ancient Egyptian depictions of offerings at the tomb of Menna, including a basket of eggs

Bird eggs have been valuable foodstuffs since prehistory, in both hunting societies and more recent cultures where birds were domesticated. The chicken was most likely domesticated for its eggs (from jungle fowl native to tropical and subtropical Southeast Asia and Indian subcontinent) before 7500 BCE. Chickens were brought to Sumer and Egypt by 1500 BCE, and arrived in Greece around 800 BCE, where the quail had been the primary source of eggs. In Thebes, Egypt, the tomb of Haremhab, dating to approximately 1420 BCE, shows a depiction of a man carrying bowls of ostrich eggs and other large eggs, presumably those of the pelican, as offerings. In ancient Rome, eggs were preserved using a number of methods and meals often started with an egg course. The Romans crushed the shells in their plates to prevent evil spirits from hiding there. The Babylonian Talmud, a Jewish work from late antiquity, states, "A soft-boiled egg is better than six logs of farina."

In the Middle Ages, eggs were forbidden during Lent because of their richness, although the motivation for forgoing eggs during Lent was not entirely religious. An annual pause in egg consumption allowed farmers to rest their flocks, and also to limit their hens' consumption of feed during a time of year when food stocks were usually scarce.

Eggs scrambled with acidic fruit juices were popular in France in the seventeenth century; this may have been the origin of lemon curd.

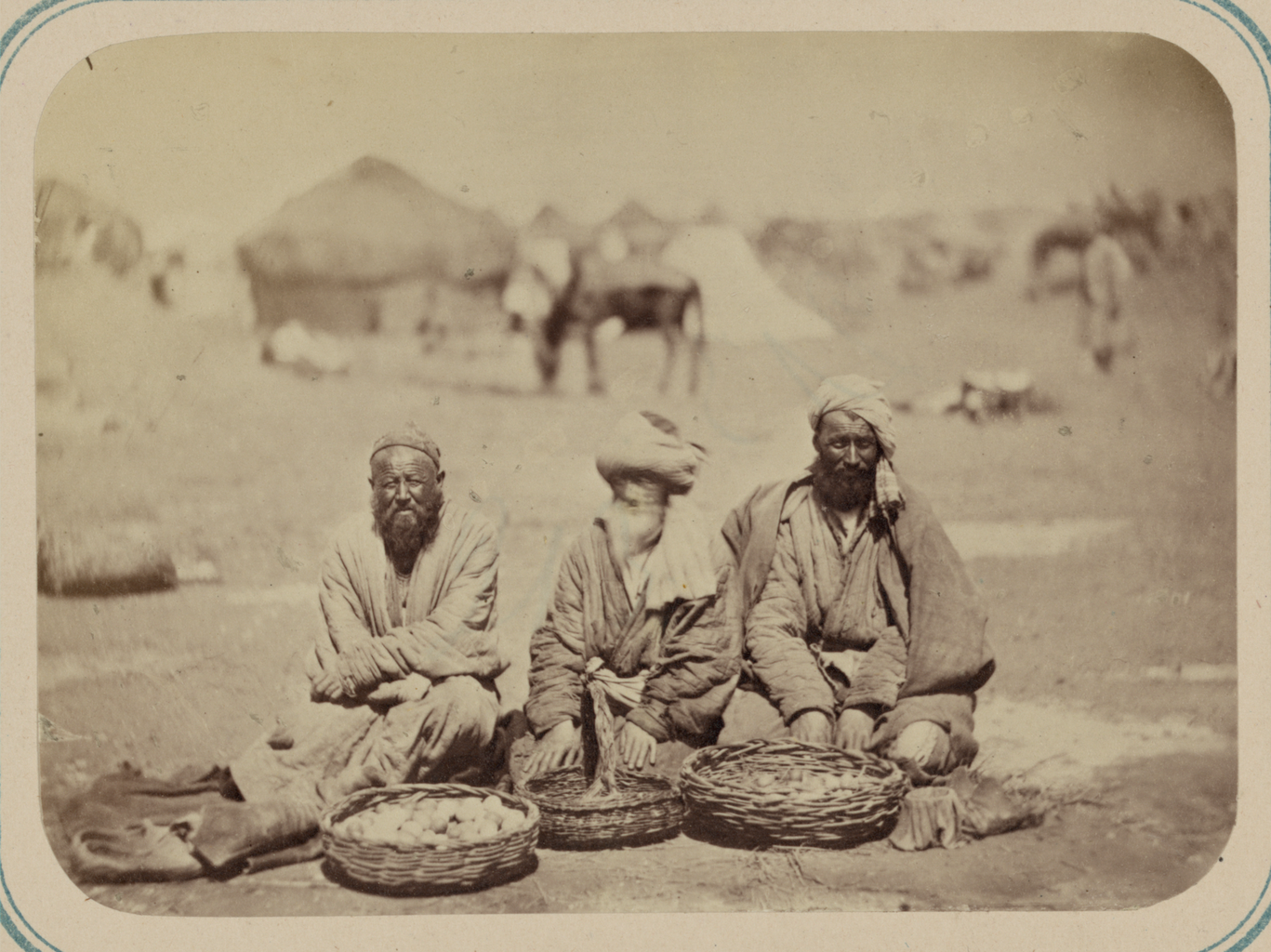
Egg vendors in Samarkand, c. 1870

The dried egg industry developed in the nineteenth century, before the rise of the frozen egg industry. In 1878, a company in St. Louis, Missouri started to transform egg yolk and egg white into a light-brown, meal-like substance by using a drying process. The production of dried eggs significantly expanded during World War II, for use by the United States Armed Forces and its allies.

In 1911, the egg carton was invented by Joseph Coyle in Smithers, British Columbia, to solve a dispute about broken eggs between a farmer in Bulkley Valley and the owner of the Aldermere Hotel. Early egg cartons were made of paper. Polystyrene egg cartons became popular in the latter half of the twentieth century as they were perceived to offer better protection especially against heat and breakage. However, by the twenty-first century, environmental considerations have led to the return of more biodegradable paper cartons (often made of recycled material) that once again became more widely used.

Whereas the wild Asian fowl from which domesticated chickens are descended typically lay about a dozen eggs every year during the breeding season, several millennia of selective breeding have produced domesticated hens capable of laying more than three hundred eggs each annually, and to lay eggs year round.

== Varieties ==
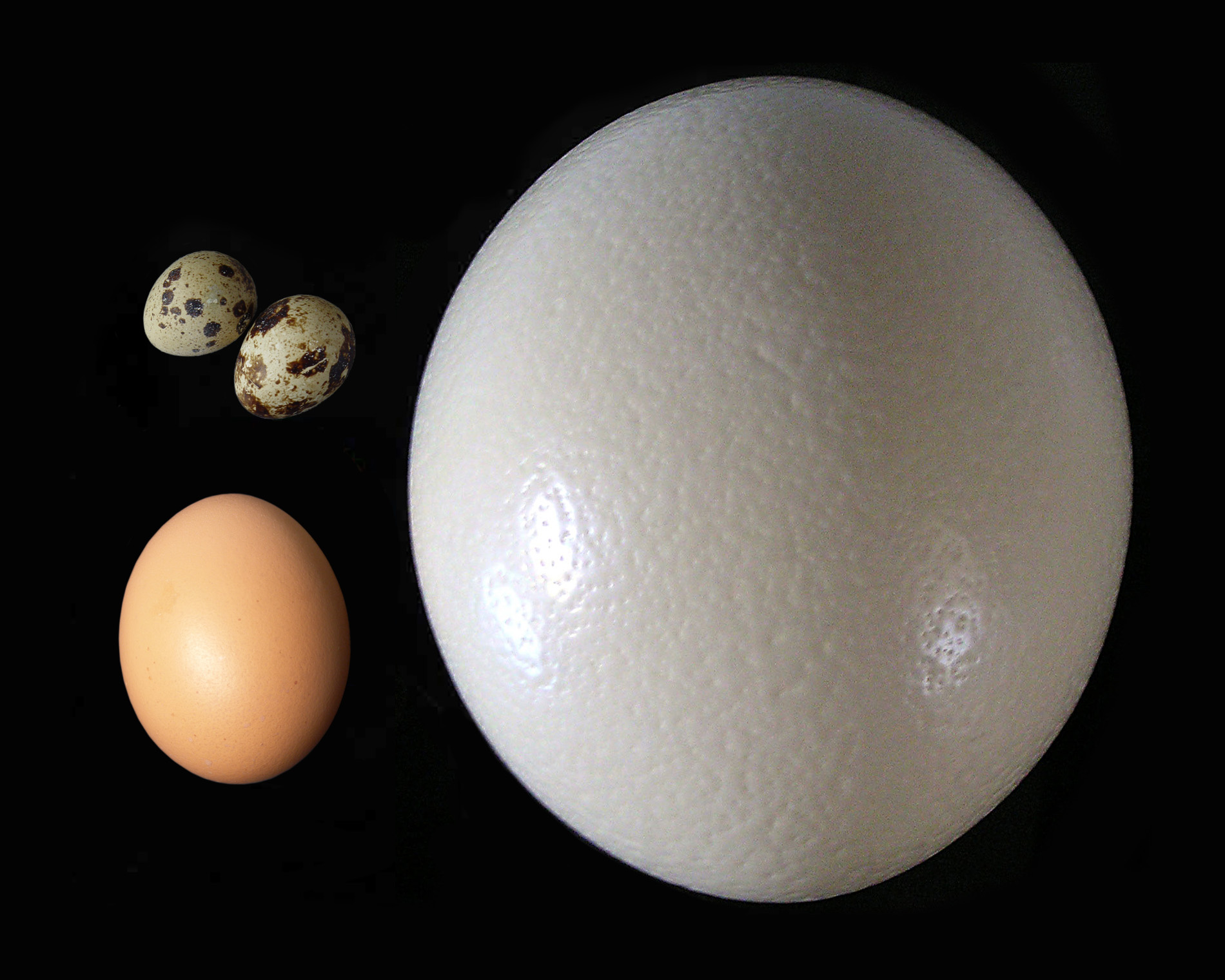
Quail eggs (upper left), chicken egg (lower left), and ostrich egg (right)

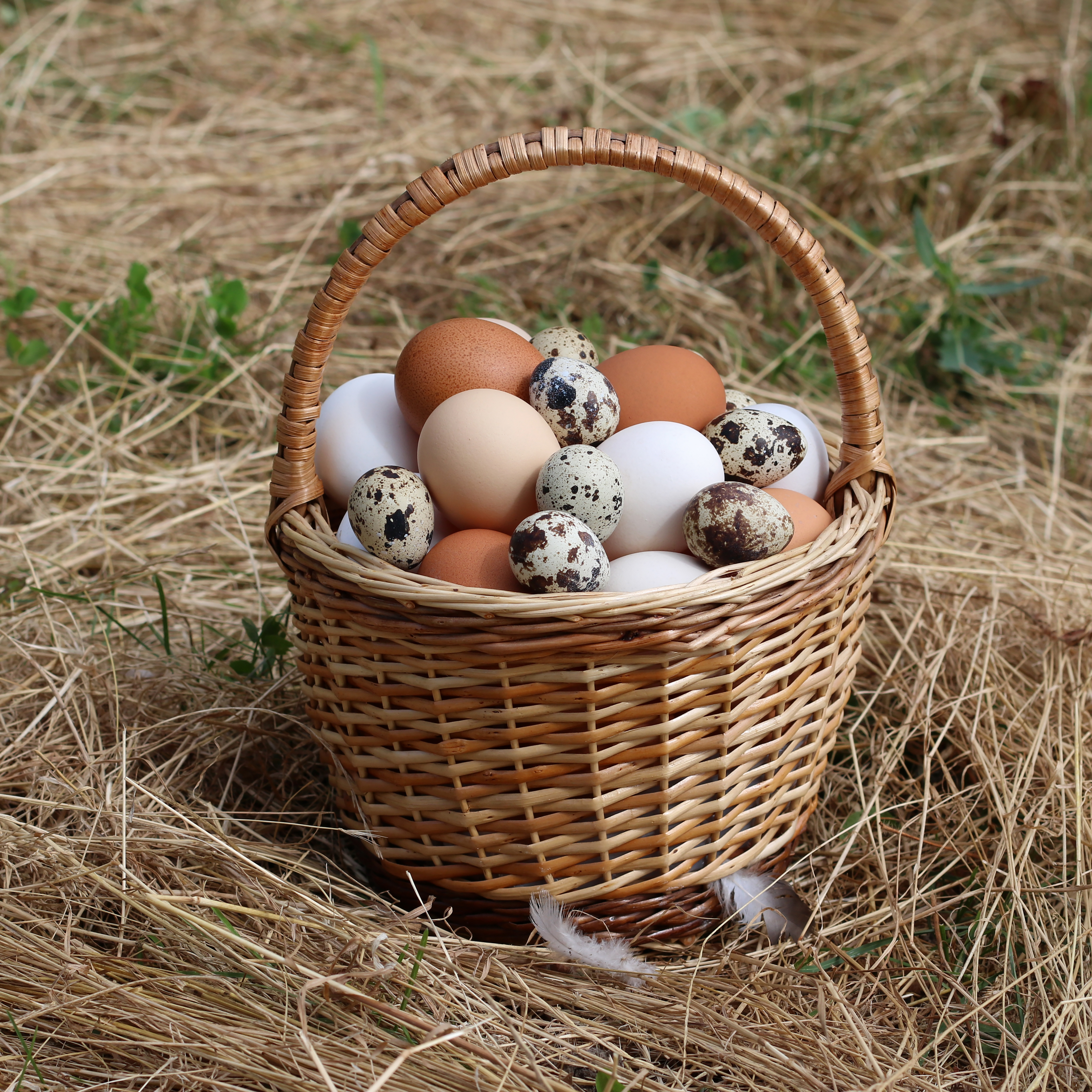
Collected chicken eggs and quail eggs in a wicker basket

Bird eggs are a common food and one of the most versatile ingredients used in cooking. They are important in many branches of the modern food industry.

The most commonly used bird eggs are those from the chicken, duck, and goose. Smaller eggs, such as quail eggs, are used occasionally as a gourmet ingredient in Western countries. Eggs are a common everyday food in many parts of Asia, such as China and Thailand, with Asian production providing 59 percent of the world total in 2013.

The largest bird eggs, ostrich eggs, tend to be used only as special luxury food. Gull eggs are considered a delicacy in England, as well as in some Scandinavian countries, particularly in Norway. In some African countries, guineafowl eggs are often seen in marketplaces, especially in the spring of each year. Pheasant eggs and emu eggs are edible, but less widely available; they are sometimes obtainable from farmers, poulterers, or luxury grocery stores. In many countries, wild bird eggs are protected by laws which prohibit the collecting or selling of them, or permit collection only during specific times of the year.

== Production ==
World production of hen eggs

In 2017, world production of chicken eggs was 80.1 million tonnes. The largest producers were China with 31.3 million of this total, the United States with 6.3 million, India at 4.8 million, Mexico at 2.8 million, Japan at 2.6 million, and Brazil and Russia with 2.5 million each. The largest egg factory in British Columbia, for example, ships 12 million eggs per week.

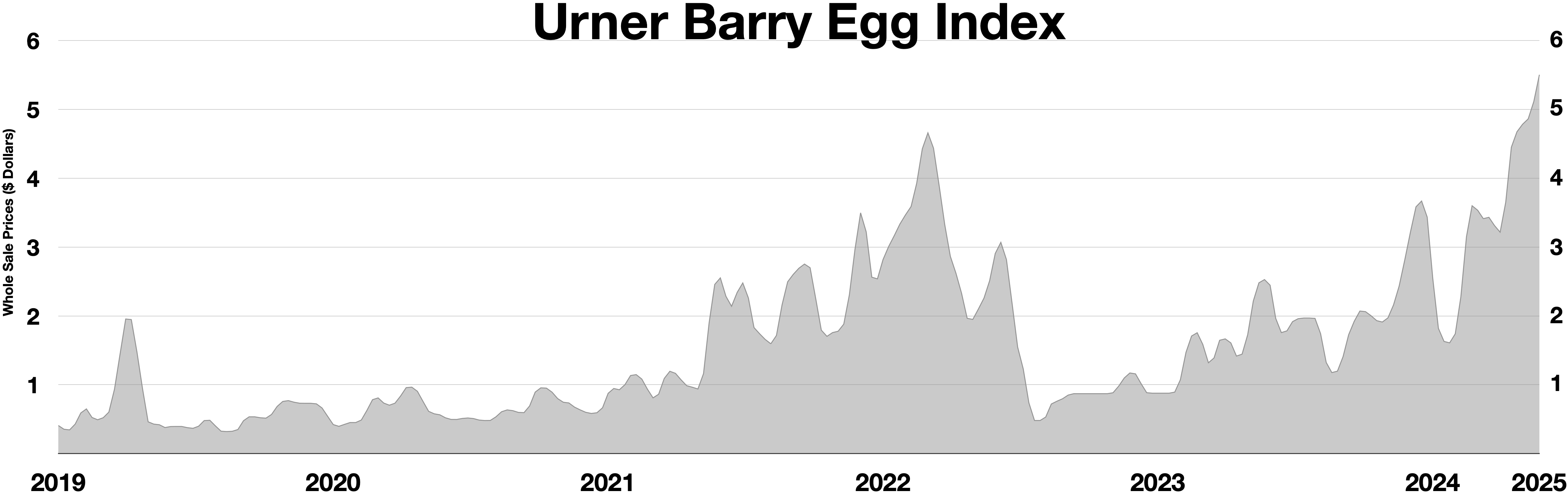
Urner Barry index of egg prices in the United States, 2019–2025

For the month of January 2019, the United States produced 9.41 billion eggs, with 8.2 billion for table consumption and 1.2 billion for raising chicks. Americans are projected to each consume 279 eggs in 2019, the highest since 1973, but less than the 405 eggs eaten per person in 1945.

In 2023, world hen egg production reached 91 million tonnes, a 77% increase from 2000 which translates into an additional 40 million tonnes over that time.

During production, eggs can be candled to check their quality. The size of an egg's air cell is determined, and if fertilization took place three to six days or earlier prior to the candling, blood vessels can usually be seen as evidence that the egg contains an embryo. Contrary to common misconception, this is not conclusive evidence of fertilization, as blood vessels can just denote an ordinary rupture on the egg yolk surface while the egg was forming. Depending on local regulations, eggs may be washed before being placed in egg boxes, although washing can shorten their length of freshness.

Per capita egg consumption kilograms per year

Egg production thousand tonnes

Egg production per hen

== Anatomy and characteristics ==
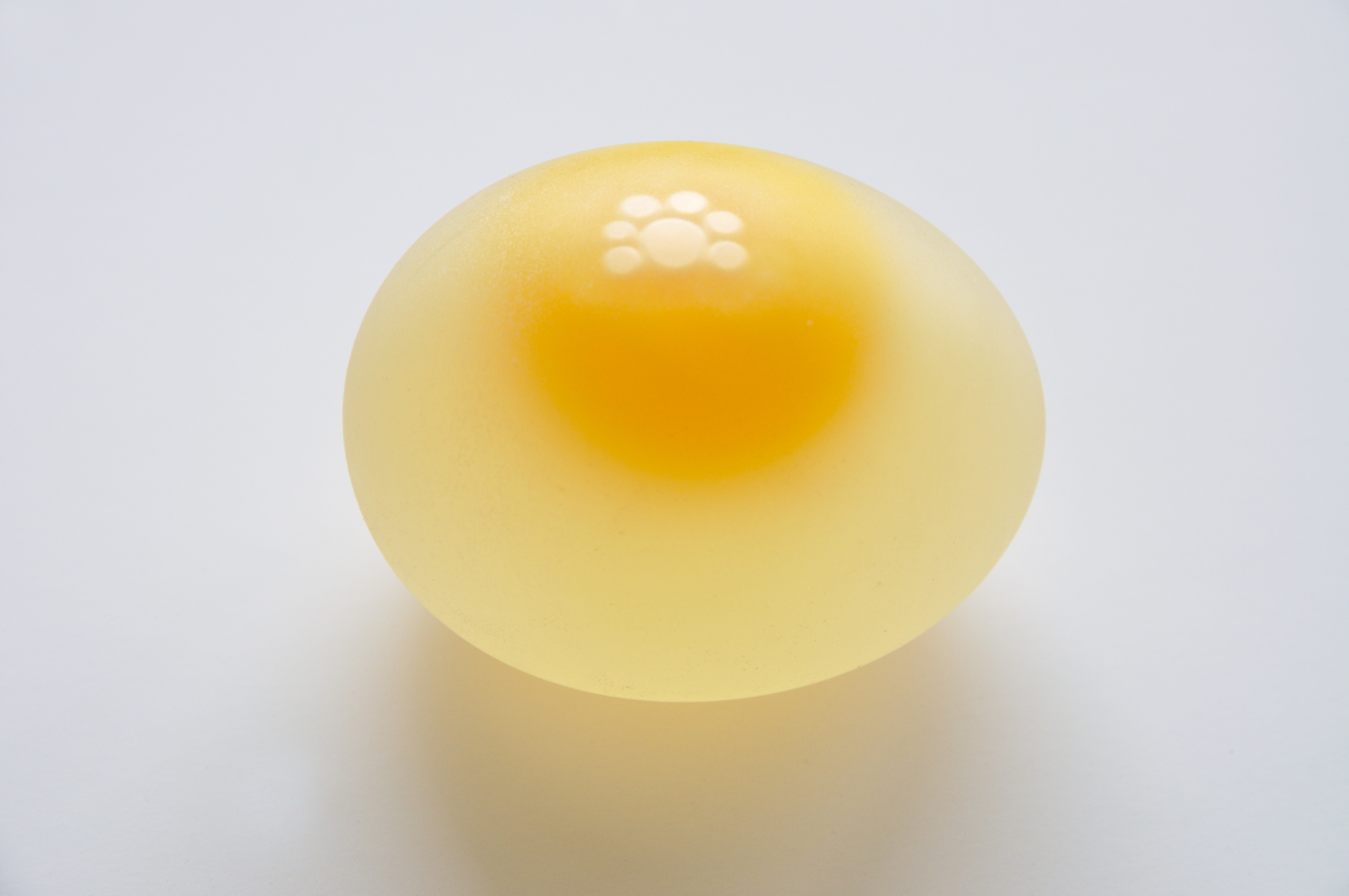
A raw chicken egg within its membrane, with the shell removed by soaking in vinegar

Schematic of a chicken egg: 1. Eggshell; 2. Outer membrane; 3. Inner membrane; 4. Chalaza; 5. Exterior albumen; 6. Middle albumen; 7. Vitelline membrane; 8. Nucleus of Pander; 9. Germinal disc (nucleus); 10. Yellow yolk; 11. White yolk; 12. Internal albumen; 13. Chalaza; 14. Air cell; 15. Cuticula

Bird and reptile eggs consist of a protective eggshell, albumen (egg white), and vitellus (egg yolk), contained within various thin membranes. The egg yolk is suspended in the egg white by one or two spiral bands of tissue called the chalazae (from the Greek word χάλαζα, meaning 'hailstone' or 'hard lump'). The shape of a chicken egg resembles a prolate spheroid with one end larger than the other and has cylindrical symmetry along the long axis.

=== Air cell ===
The larger end of the egg contains an air cell that forms when the contents of the egg cool down and contract after it is laid. Chicken eggs are graded according to the size of this air cell, measured during candling. A very fresh egg has a small air cell and receives a grade of AA. As the size of the air cell increases and the quality of the egg decreases, the grade moves from AA to A to B. This provides a way of testing the age of an egg: as the air cell increases in size due to air being drawn through pores in the shell as water is lost, the egg becomes less dense and the larger end of the egg will rise to increasingly shallower depths when the egg is placed in a bowl of water. A very old egg will float in the water and should not be eaten, especially if a foul odor can be detected if the egg is cracked open.

=== Shell ===
Eggshell color is caused by pigment deposition during egg formation in the oviduct and may vary according to species and breed, from the more common white or brown to pink or speckled blue-green. The brown pigment is protoporphyrin IX, a precursor of heme, and the blue pigment is biliverdin, a product of the breakdown of heme. Generally, chicken breeds with white ear lobes lay white eggs, whereas chickens with red ear lobes lay brown eggs. Although there is no significant link between shell color and nutritional value, there is often a cultural preference for one color over another (see § Color of eggshell below). As candling is less effective with brown eggs, they have a significantly higher incidence of blood spots.

=== Membrane ===
The eggshell membrane is a clear film lining the eggshell, visible when one peels a boiled egg. Primarily, it is composed of fibrous proteins such as collagen type I. These membranes may be used commercially as a dietary supplement.

=== White ===
"White" is the common name for the clear liquid (also called the albumen or the glair/glaire) contained within an egg. Colorless and transparent initially, upon cooking it turns white and opaque. In chickens, it is formed from the layers of secretions of the anterior section of the hen oviduct during the passage of the egg. It forms around both fertilized and unfertilized yolks. The primary natural purpose of egg white is to protect the yolk and provide additional nutrition during the growth of the embryo.

Egg white consists primarily of approximately 90 percent water into which is dissolved 10 percent proteins (including albumins, mucoproteins, and globulins). Unlike the yolk, which is high in lipids (fats), egg white contains almost no fat and the carbohydrate content is less than one percent. Egg white has numerous uses in food and many other applications, including the preparation of vaccines, such as those for influenza.

=== Yolk ===
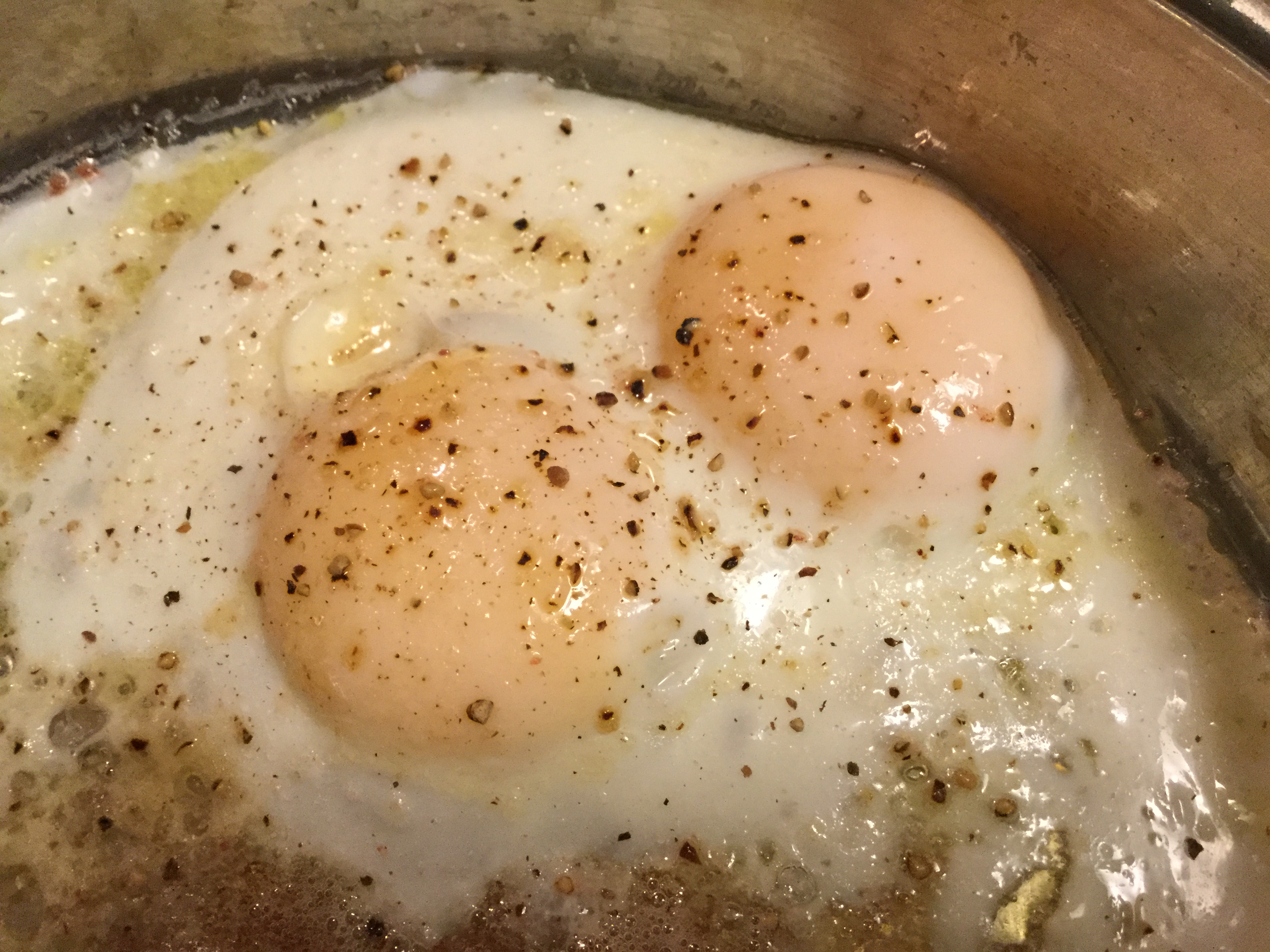
A single egg with two yolks

The yolk in a newly laid egg is round and firm. As the yolk ages, it absorbs water from the albumen, which increases its size and causes it to stretch and weaken the vitelline membrane (the clear casing enclosing the yolk). The resulting effect is a flattened and enlarged yolk shape.

Yolk color is dependent on the diet of the hen. If the diet contains yellow or orange plant pigments known as xanthophylls, then they are deposited in the yolk, coloring it. Lutein is the most abundant pigment in egg yolk. A diet without such colorful foods may result in an almost colorless yolk. Yolk color is, for example, enhanced if the diet includes foods such as yellow maize and marigold petals. In the US, the use of artificial color additives is forbidden.

=== Abnormalities ===
Abnormalities that have been found in eggs purchased for human consumption include:

- Double-yolk eggs, when an egg contains two or more yolks, occurs when ovulation occurs too rapidly, or when one yolk becomes joined with another yolk.
- Yolkless eggs, which contain whites but no yolk, usually occurs during a pullet's first effort, produced before her laying mechanism is fully ready.
- Double-shelled eggs, where an egg may have two or more outer shells, is caused by a counter-peristalsis contraction and occurs when a second oocyte is released by the ovary before the first egg has completely traveled through the oviduct and been laid.
- Shell-less or thin-shelled eggs may be caused by egg drop syndrome.

== Culinary properties ==
=== Types of dish ===
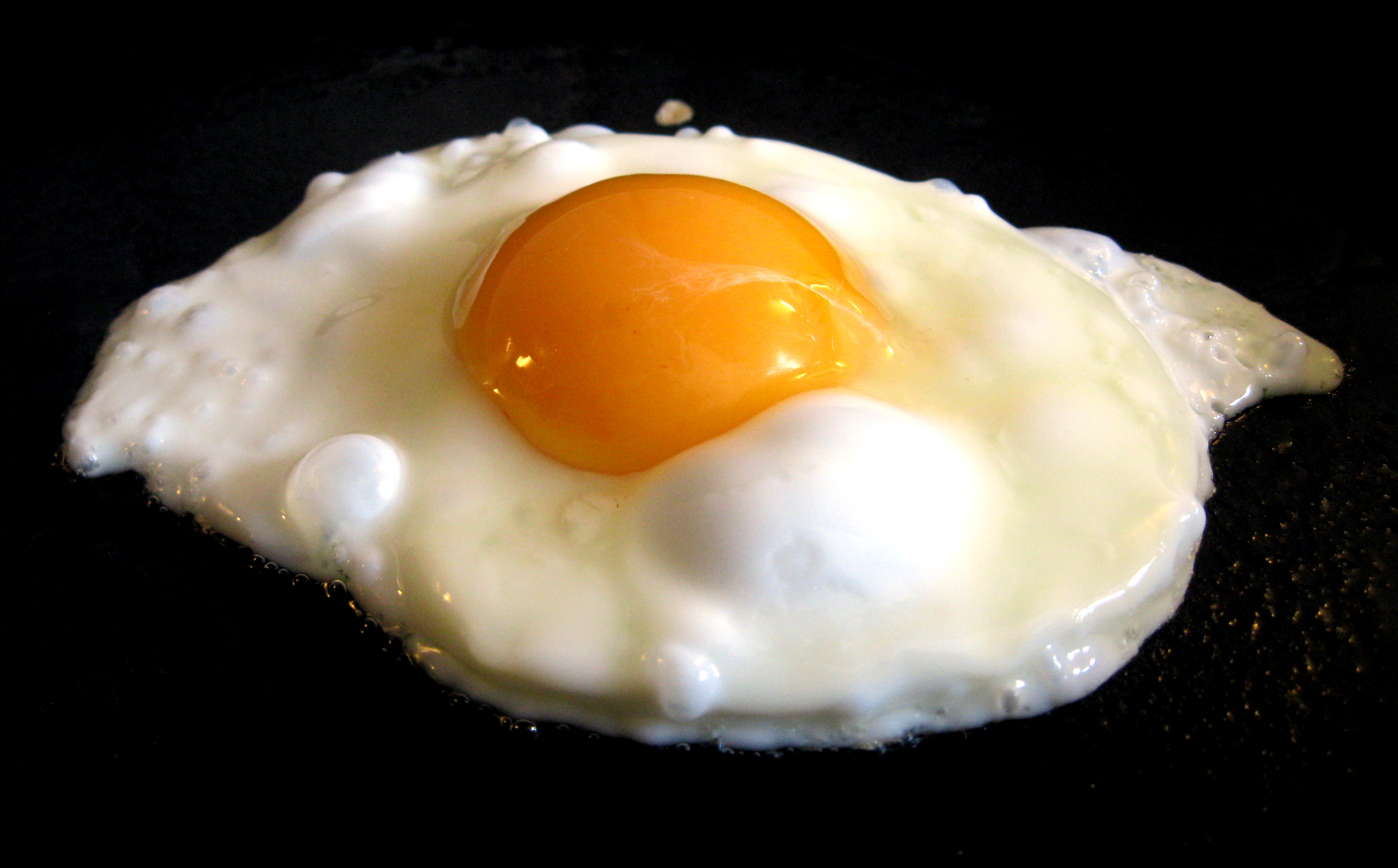
A fried chicken egg, sunny side up

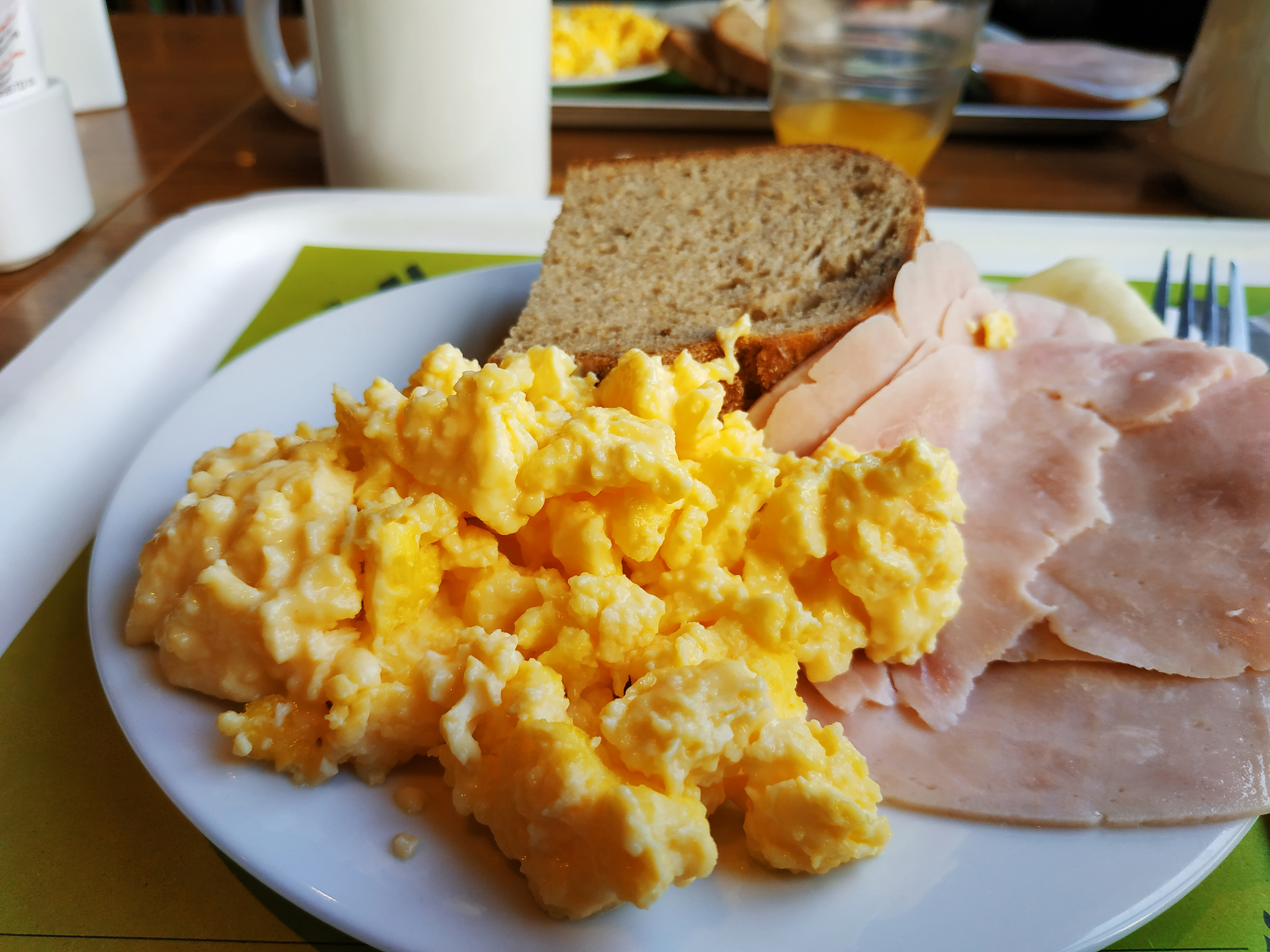
Scrambled eggs served with ham and toast

Chicken eggs are widely used in numerous types of dish, both sweet and savory, including many baked goods. Some of the most common preparation methods include scrambled, fried, poached, boiled (hard- or soft-), omelettes, and pickled. They also may be eaten raw, although this is not recommended for people who may be especially susceptible to salmonellosis, such as the elderly, the infirm, or pregnant women. In addition, the protein in raw eggs is only 51 percent bioavailable, whereas that of a cooked egg is nearer 91 percent bioavailable, meaning the protein of cooked eggs is nearly twice as absorbable as the protein from raw eggs.

As a cooking ingredient, egg yolks are an important emulsifier in the kitchen, and are also used as a thickener, as in custards.

The albumen (egg white) contains protein, but little or no fat, and may be used in cooking separately from the yolk. The proteins in egg white allow it to form foams and aerated dishes. Egg whites may be aerated or whipped to a light, fluffy consistency, and are often used in desserts such as meringues and mousse.

Ground eggshells are sometimes used as a food additive to deliver calcium. Every part of an egg is edible, although the eggshell is generally discarded. Some recipes call for immature or unlaid eggs, which are harvested after the hen is slaughtered or cooked, while still inside the chicken.

=== Cooking ===
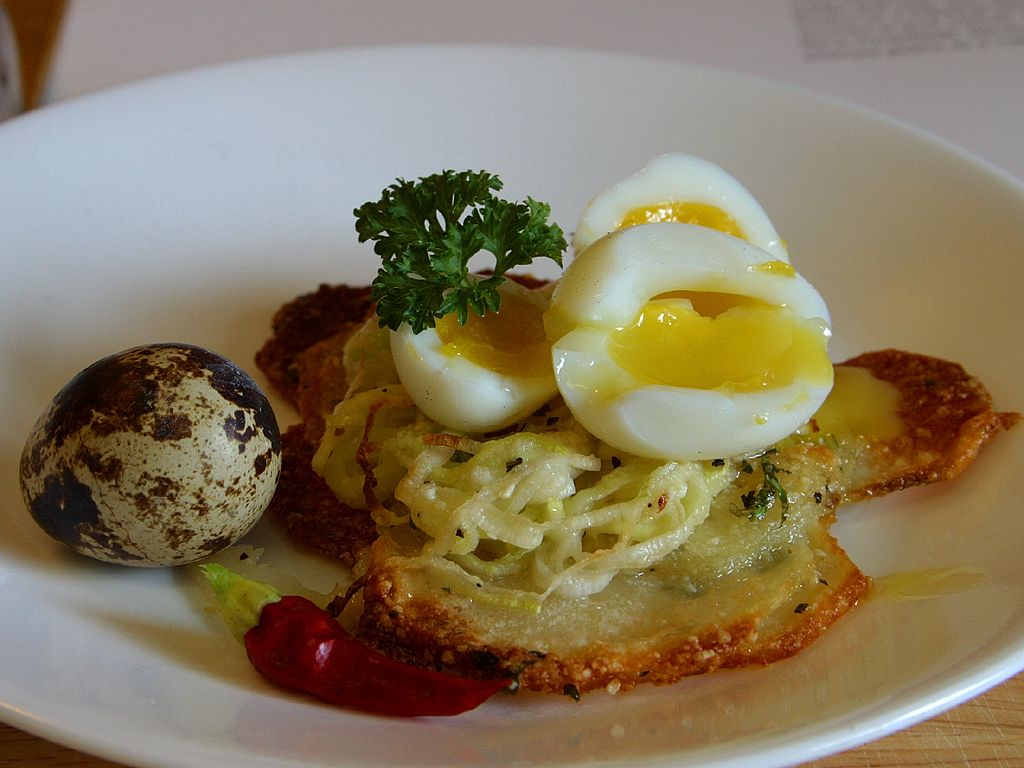
Soft-boiled quail eggs with potato galettes. The yolk of the eggs have not yet fully solidified.

Eggs contain multiple proteins that gel at different temperatures within the yolk and the white, and the temperature determines the gelling time. Egg yolk becomes a gel, or solidifies, between 61 and 70 °C (142 and 158 °F). Egg white gels at different temperatures: 60 to 73 °C (140 to 163 °F). The white contains exterior albumen which sets at the highest temperature. In practice, in many cooking processes the white gels first because it is exposed to higher temperatures for longer.

Salmonella is killed instantly at 71 °C (160 °F), but is also killed from 54.5 °C (130.1 °F), if held at that temperature for a sufficiently long time. To avoid the issue of salmonella, eggs may be pasteurized in-shell at 57 °C (135 °F) for an hour and 15 minutes. Although the white then is slightly milkier, the eggs may be used in normal ways. Whipping for meringue takes significantly longer, but the final volume is virtually the same.

If a boiled egg is overcooked, a greenish ring sometimes appears around the egg yolk due to changes to the iron and sulfur compounds in the egg. It also may occur with an abundance of iron in the cooking water. Overcooking harms the quality of the protein. Chilling an overcooked egg for a few minutes in cold water until it is completely cooled may prevent the greenish ring from forming on the surface of the yolk.

Peeling a cooked egg is easiest when the egg was put into boiling water as opposed to slowly heating the egg from a start in cold water.

In February 2025, scientists published research confirming that periodic cooking of an egg is the best way to preserve the distinct textures of each part of an egg as well as its nutritional value. The method requires alternating between boiling and tepid water: two minutes in 100 °C (212 °F) water, two minutes at 30 °C (86 °F), repeated eight times.

=== Flavor variations ===
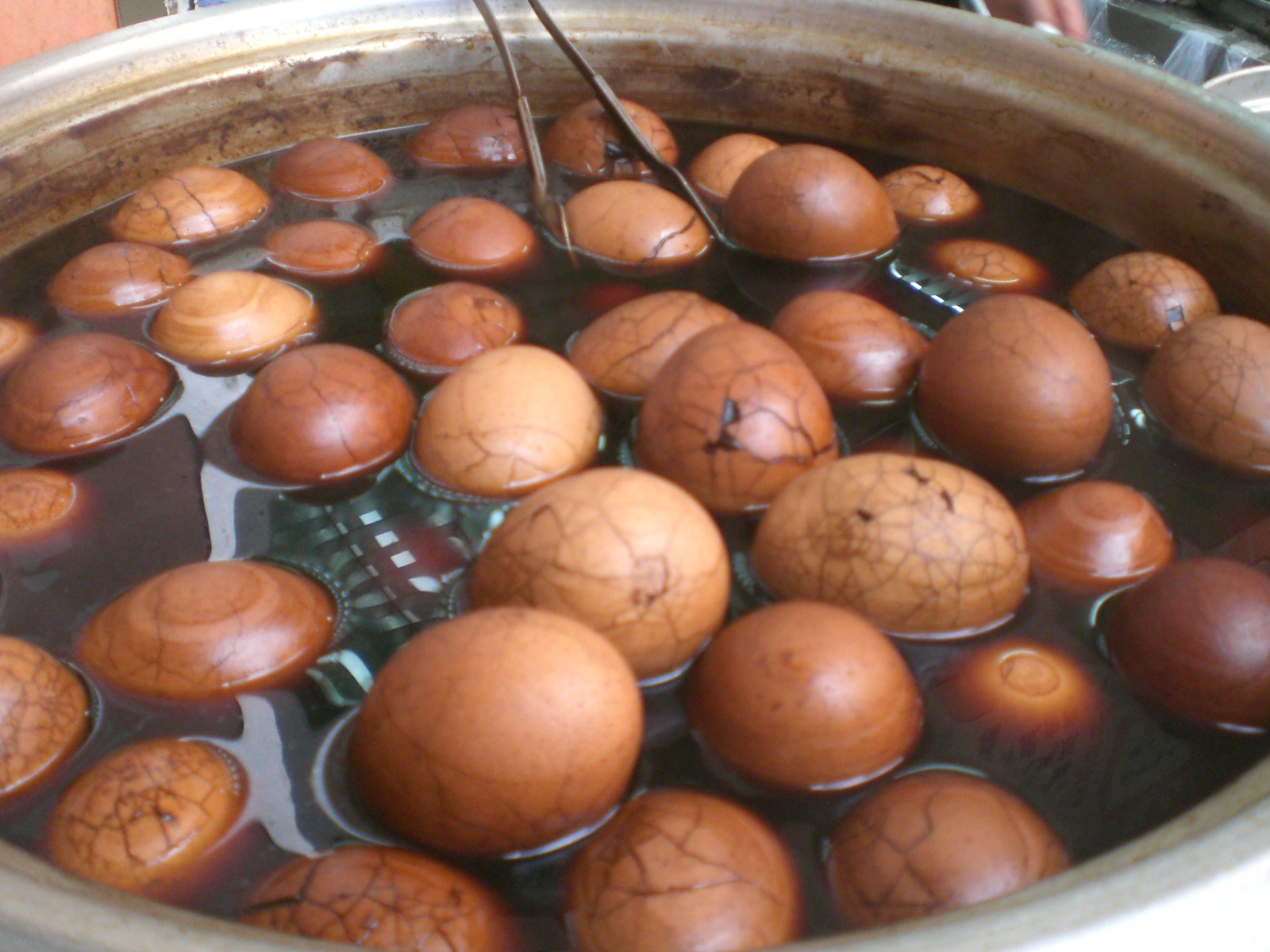
A batch of tea eggs with shell intact soaking in a brew of spices and tea

Although the age of the egg and the conditions of its storage have a greater influence, the bird's diet affects the flavor of the egg. For example, when a brown-egg chicken breed eats rapeseed (canola) or soy meals, its intestinal microbes metabolize them into fishy-smelling triethylamine, which ends up in the egg. The unpredictable diet of free-range hens will produce likewise, unpredictable egg flavors. Duck eggs tend to have a flavor distinct from, but still resembling, chicken eggs.

Eggs may be soaked in mixtures to absorb flavor. Tea eggs, a common snack sold from street-side carts in China, are steeped in a brew from a mixture of various spices, soy sauce, and black tea leaves to give flavor. Hard boiled eggs are cracked slightly before being simmered in the marinade for more flavor, also giving them their marble pattern.

=== Storage ===
Careful storage of edible eggs is extremely important, as an improperly handled egg may contain elevated levels of Salmonella bacteria that can cause severe food poisoning. In the US, eggs are washed. This cleans the shell, but erodes its cuticle. The USDA thus recommends refrigerating eggs to prevent the growth of Salmonella.

Refrigeration also preserves the taste and texture. In Europe, eggs are not usually washed, and the shells are dirtier, however the cuticle is undamaged, and they do not require refrigeration. In the UK in particular, hens are immunized against salmonella and generally, their eggs are safe for 21 days.

=== Preservation ===
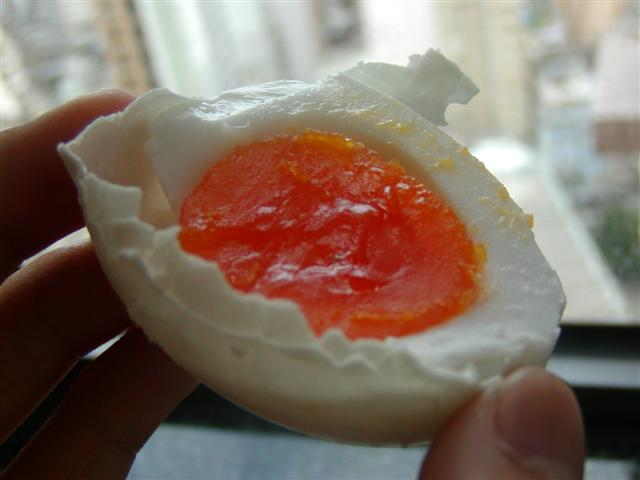
Salted duck egg

The simplest method to preserve an egg is to treat it with salt. Salt draws water out of bacteria and molds, which prevents their growth. The Chinese salted duck egg is made by immersing duck eggs in brine, or coating them individually with a paste of salt and mud or clay. The eggs stop absorbing salt after approximately a month, having reached osmotic equilibrium. Their yolks take on an orange-red color and solidify, but the white remains somewhat liquid. These are often boiled before consumption and are served with rice congee; the yolks are also used in mooncakes and other pastries.

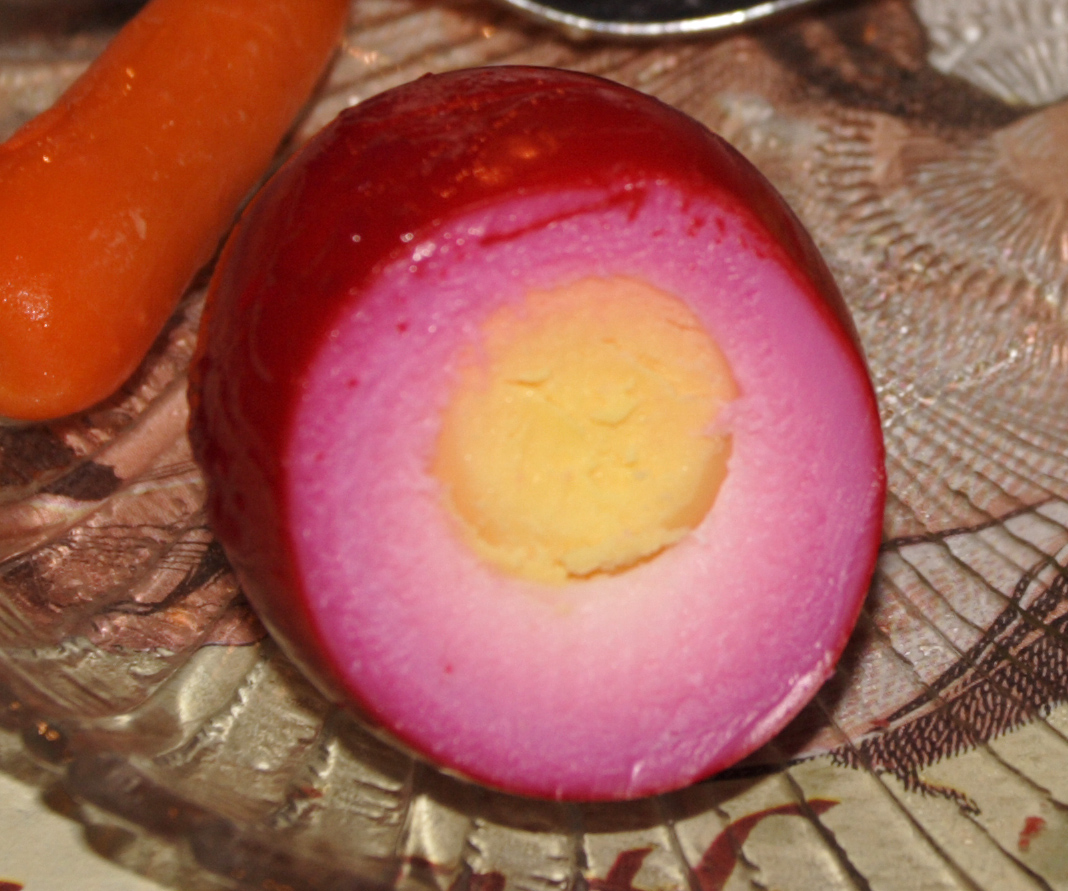
Pickled egg, colored with beetroot juice

Another method is to make pickled eggs, by boiling them first and immersing them in a mixture of vinegar, salt, and spices, such as ginger or allspice. Beetroot juice is frequently added to impart a red color to the eggs. If the eggs are immersed in it for a few hours, the distinct red, white, and yellow colors may be seen when the eggs are sliced. If marinated for several days or more, the red color will reach the yolk. If the eggs are marinated in the mixture for several weeks or more, the vinegar will dissolve much of the shell's calcium carbonate and penetrate the egg, making it acidic enough to inhibit the growth of bacteria and molds. Pickled eggs made this way generally keep for a year or more without refrigeration.

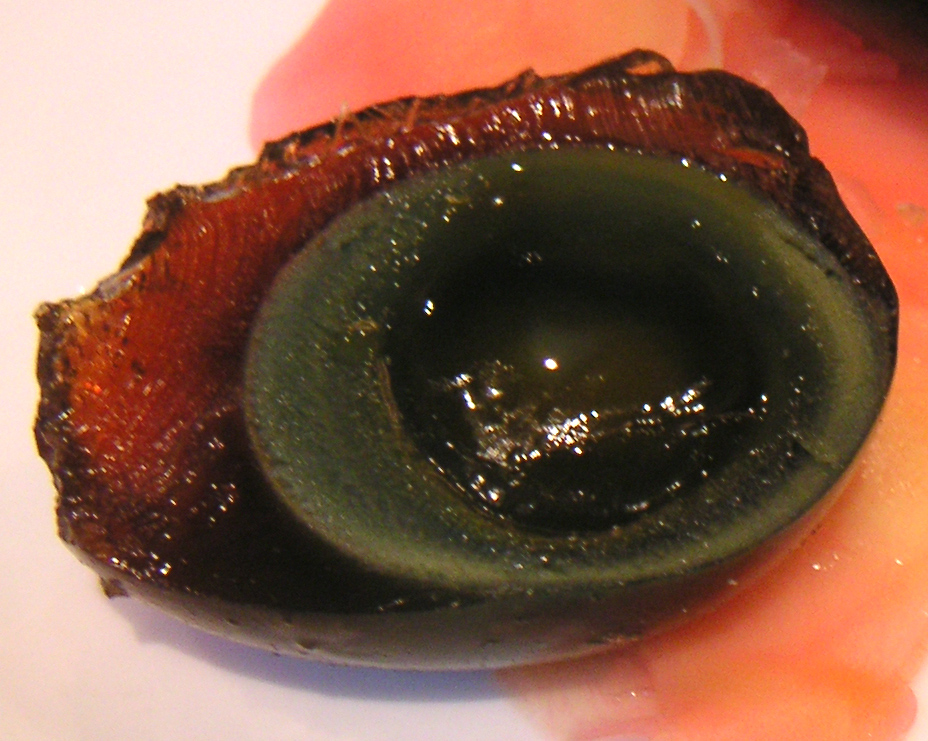
Century egg

A century egg or hundred-year-old egg is preserved by coating an egg in a mixture of clay, wood ash, salt, lime, and rice straw for several weeks to several months, depending on the method of processing. After the process is completed, the yolk becomes a dark green, cream-like substance with a strong odor of sulfur and ammonia, while the white becomes a dark brown, transparent jelly with a comparatively mild, distinct flavor. The transforming agent in a century egg is its alkaline material, which gradually raises the pH of the egg from approximately 9 to 12 or more. This chemical process breaks down some of the complex, flavorless proteins and fats of the yolk into simpler, flavorful ones, which in some way may be thought of as an "inorganic" version of fermentation.

== Nutrition and health effects ==
Chicken egg whole, hard-boiled
Nutritional value per 100 g (3.5 oz)
- Energy: 647 kJ (155 kcal)
- Carbohydrates: 1.12 g
- Fat: 10.6 g
- Protein: 12.6 g
Amino acids
Tryptophan	0.153 g
Threonine	0.604 g
Isoleucine	0.686 g
Leucine	1.075 g
Lysine	0.904 g
Methionine	0.392 g
Cystine	0.292 g
Phenylalanine	0.668 g
Tyrosine	0.513 g
Valine	0.767 g
Arginine	0.755 g
Histidine	0.298 g
Alanine	0.700 g
Aspartic acid	1.264 g
Glutamic acid	1.644 g
Glycine	0.423 g
Proline	0.501 g
Serine	0.936 g
Vitamins and minerals
Vitamins	Quantity %DV^{†}
Vitamin A equiv.	17% 149 μg
Thiamine (B1)	6% 0.066 mg
Riboflavin (B2)	38% 0.5 mg
Niacin (B3)	0% 0.064 mg
Pantothenic acid (B5)	28% 1.4 mg
Vitamin B6	7% 0.121 mg
Folate (B9)	11% 44 μg
Vitamin B12	46% 1.11 μg
Choline	53% 294 mg
Vitamin D	11% 87 IU
Vitamin E	7% 1.03 mg
Vitamin K	0% 0.3 μg
Minerals	Quantity %DV^{†}
Calcium	4% 50 mg
Iron	7% 1.2 mg
Magnesium	2% 10 mg
Phosphorus	14% 172 mg
Potassium	4% 126 mg
Sodium	5% 126 mg
Zinc	9% 1.0 mg
- Other constituents: Quantity
- Water: 75 g
- Cholesterol: 373 mg
- For edible portion only. Refuse: 12% (shell). An egg just large enough to be classified as "large" in the U.S. yields 50 grams of egg without shell. This size egg is classified as "medium" in Europe and "standard" in New Zealand. Link to USDA Database entry
- ^{†}Percentages estimated using US recommendations for adults, except for potassium, which is estimated based on expert recommendation from the National Academies.

Egg yolks and whole eggs store significant amounts of protein and choline. Due to their protein content, the United States Department of Agriculture formerly categorized eggs as Meat within the Food Guide Pyramid (now MyPlate). Under the Protein Digestibility Corrected Amino Acid Score (PDCAAS) system, they score the maximum value of 1.0, and under the Digestible Indispensable Amino Acid Score (DIAAS) system, they are also classified as an excellent-quality protein source.

A 50-gram (1.8 oz) medium/large chicken egg provides approximately 70 kilocalories (290 kJ) of food energy and 6 grams of protein.

Cooking methods affect the nutritional values of eggs. For example, a large whole chicken egg contains approximately 0.45 - 0.5 μg of vitamin B12, which is concentrated in the yolk. Different cooking methods retain varying amounts of this vitamin; scrambled eggs lose about 5%, lightly fried eggs 5 - 15%, and hard-boiled up to 20%. Studies have also found that the average absorption of vitamin B12 from fried or boiled eggs is more than twice that from scrambled eggs. Eggs (boiled) supply several vitamins and minerals as significant amounts of the Daily Value (DV), including (per 100g) vitamin A (19% DV), riboflavin (42% DV), pantothenic acid (28% DV), vitamin B_{12} (46% DV), choline (60% DV), phosphorus (25% DV), zinc (11% DV) and vitamin D (15% DV).

The diet of laying hens also may affect the nutritional quality of eggs. For instance, chicken eggs that are especially high in omega-3 fatty acids are produced by feeding hens a diet containing polyunsaturated fats from sources such as fish oil, chia seeds, or flaxseeds. Pasture-raised free-range hens, which forage for their own food, also produce eggs that are relatively enriched in omega-3 fatty acids when compared to those of cage-raised chickens.

A 2010 USDA study determined there were no significant differences of macronutrients in various chicken eggs.

Cooked eggs are easier to digest than raw eggs, as well as having a lower risk of salmonellosis.

=== Cholesterol and fat ===
More than half the calories found in eggs come from the fat in the yolk; 50 grams of chicken egg (the contents of an egg just large enough to be classified as "large" in the US, but "medium" in Europe) contains approximately five grams of fat. Saturated fat (palmitic, stearic, and myristic acids) makes up 33 percent of the fat in an egg; monounsaturated fat makes up 38 percent; polyunsaturated makes up 20 percent; and cholesterol makes up 4 percent. The egg white consists primarily of water (88 percent) and protein (11 percent), with no cholesterol and 0.2 percent fat.

There is debate over whether egg yolk presents a health risk. Some research suggests dietary cholesterol increases the ratio of total to HDL cholesterol and, therefore, adversely affects the body's cholesterol profile; whereas other studies show that moderate consumption of eggs, up to one a day, does not appear to increase heart disease risk in healthy individuals. Harold McGee argues that the cholesterol in the egg yolk is not what causes a problem, because fat (particularly saturated fat) is much more likely to raise cholesterol levels than the consumption of cholesterol.

=== Type 2 diabetes ===
Studies have shown conflicting results about a possible connection between egg consumption and type 2 diabetes.

A meta-analysis from 2013 found that eating four eggs per week was associated with a 29 percent increase in the relative risk of developing diabetes. Another meta-analysis from 2013 also supported the idea that egg consumption may lead to an increased incidence of type two diabetes. A 2016 meta-analysis suggested that association of egg consumption with increased risk of incident type 2 diabetes may be restricted to cohort studies from the United States.

A 2020 meta-analysis found that there was no overall association between moderate egg consumption and risk of type 2 diabetes and that the risk found in US studies was not found in European or Asian studies.

=== Cancer ===
A 2015 meta-analysis found an association between higher egg consumption (five a week) with increased risk of breast cancer compared to no egg consumption. Another meta-analysis found that egg consumption may increase ovarian cancer risk.

A 2019 meta-analysis found an association between high egg consumption and risk of upper aero-digestive tract cancers in hospital-based case-control studies.

A 2021 review did not find a significant association between egg consumption and breast cancer. A 2021 umbrella review found that egg consumption significantly increases the risk of ovarian cancer.

=== Cardiovascular health ===
One systematic review and meta-analysis of egg consumption found that higher consumption of eggs (more than 1 egg/day) was associated with a significant reduction in risk of coronary artery disease. Another systematic review and meta-analysis of dietary cholesterol and egg consumption found that egg consumption was associated with an increased all-cause mortality and CVD mortality. These contrary results may be due to somewhat different methods of study selection and the use primarily of observational studies, where confounding factors are not controlled.

A 2018 meta-analysis of randomized clinical trials found that consumption of eggs increases total cholesterol (TC), LDL-C and HDL-C compared to no egg-consumption, but not to low-egg control diets. In 2020, two meta-analyses found that moderate egg consumption (up to one egg a day) is not associated with an increased cardiovascular disease risk. A 2020 umbrella review concluded that increased egg consumption is not associated with cardiovascular disease risk in the general population. Another umbrella review found no association between egg consumption and cardiovascular disorders.

A 2013 meta-analysis found no association between egg consumption and heart disease or stroke. A 2013 systematic review and meta-analysis found no association between egg consumption and cardiovascular disease or cardiovascular disease mortality, but did find egg consumption of more than once daily increased cardiovascular disease risk 1.69-fold in those with type 2 diabetes mellitus when compared to type 2 diabetics who ate less than one egg per week. Another 2013 meta-analysis found that eating four eggs per week increased the risk of cardiovascular disease by six percent.

Eggs are one of the largest sources of phosphatidylcholine (lecithin) in the human diet. A study published in the scientific journal, Nature, showed that dietary phosphatidylcholine is digested by bacteria in the gut and eventually converted into the compound TMAO, a compound linked with increased heart disease. Another study found that type 2 diabetes mellitus and kidney disease also increase TMAO levels and that evidence for a link between TMAO and cardiovascular diseases may be due to confounding or reverse causality.

=== Other ===
Egg consumption does not increase hypertension risk. A 2016 meta-analysis found that consumption of up to one egg a day may contribute to a decreased risk of total stroke. Two recent meta-analyses found no association between egg intake and risk of stroke.

A 2019 meta-analysis revealed that egg consumption has no significant effect on serum biomarkers of inflammation. A 2021 review of clinical trials found that egg consumption has beneficial effects on macular pigment optical density and serum lutein.

=== Contamination ===
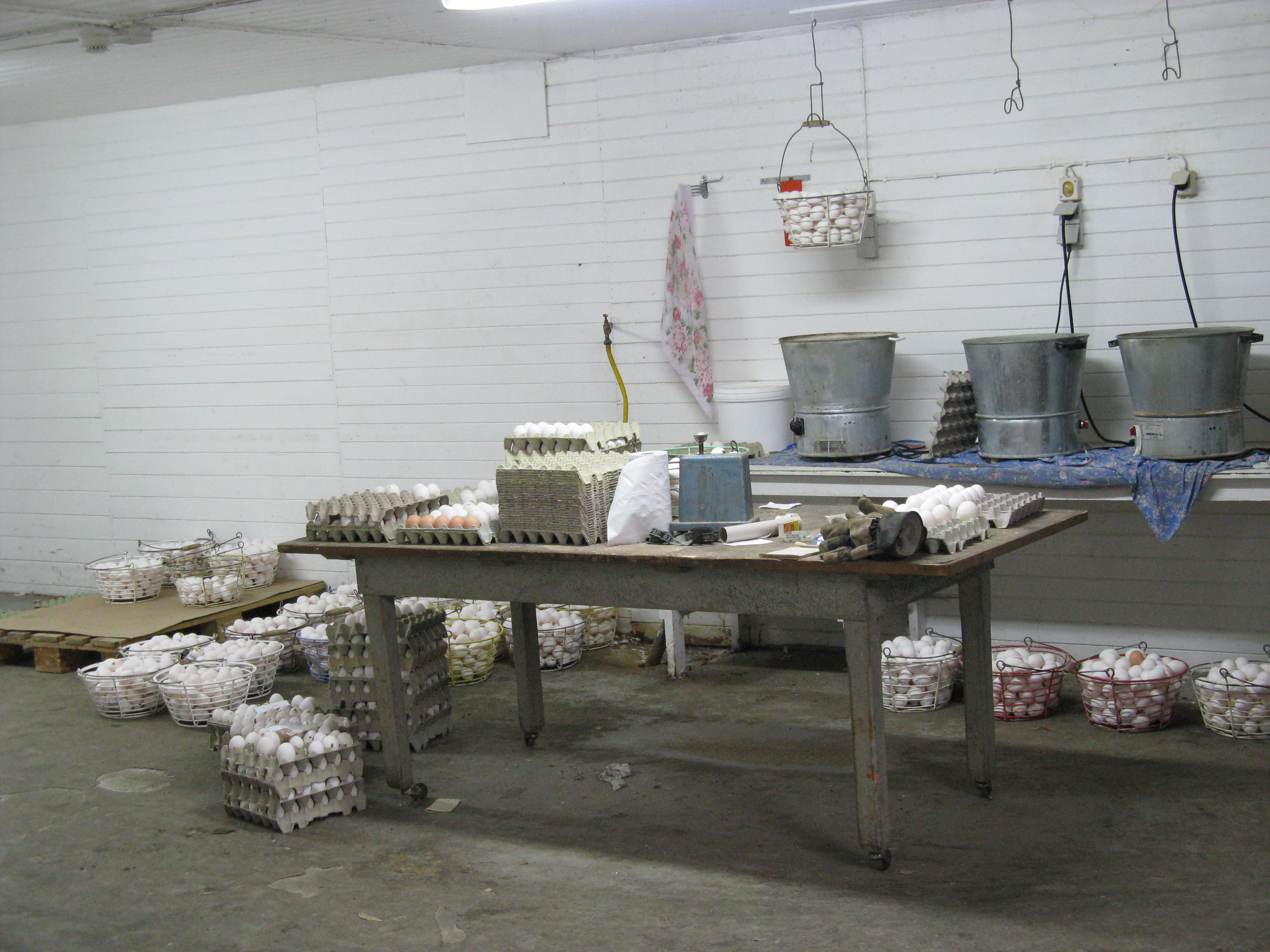
Egg cleaning on a farm in Norway

A health issue associated with eggs is contamination by pathogenic bacteria, such as Salmonella enteritidis. Contamination of eggs with other members of the genus Salmonella while exiting a female bird via the cloaca may occur, so care must be taken to prevent the egg shell from becoming contaminated with fecal matter. In commercial practice in the US, eggs are quickly washed with a sanitizing solution within minutes of being laid. The risk of infection from raw or undercooked eggs is dependent in part upon the sanitary conditions under which the hens are kept.

Health experts advise people to refrigerate washed eggs, use them within two weeks, cook them thoroughly, and never consume raw eggs. As with meat, containers and surfaces that have been used to process raw eggs should not come in contact with ready-to-eat food.

A study by the U.S. Department of Agriculture in 2002 (Risk Analysis April 2002 22(2):203-18) suggests the problem is not so prevalent in the U.S. as once thought. It showed that of the 69 billion eggs produced annually, only 2.3 million are contaminated with Salmonella—equivalent to just one in every 30,000 eggs—thus showing Salmonella infection is quite rarely induced by eggs. This has not been the case in other countries, however, where Salmonella enteritidis and Salmonella typhimurium infections due to egg consumption are major concerns. Egg shells act as hermetic seals that guard against bacteria entering, but this seal can be broken through improper handling or if laid by unhealthy chickens. Most forms of contamination enter through such weaknesses in the shell. In the UK, the British Egg Industry Council awards the lions stamp to eggs that, among other things, come from hens that have been vaccinated against Salmonella.

In 2017, authorities blocked millions of eggs from sale in the Netherlands, Belgium, and Germany because of contamination with the insecticide fipronil.

=== Food allergy ===
One of the most common food allergies in infants is eggs. Infants usually have the opportunity to grow out of this allergy during childhood, if exposure is minimized. Allergic reactions against egg white are more common than reactions against egg yolks. In addition to true allergic reactions, some people experience a food intolerance to egg whites. Food labeling practices in most developed countries now include eggs, egg products, and the processing of foods on equipment that also process foods containing eggs in a special allergen alert section of the ingredients on the labels.

== Farming ==
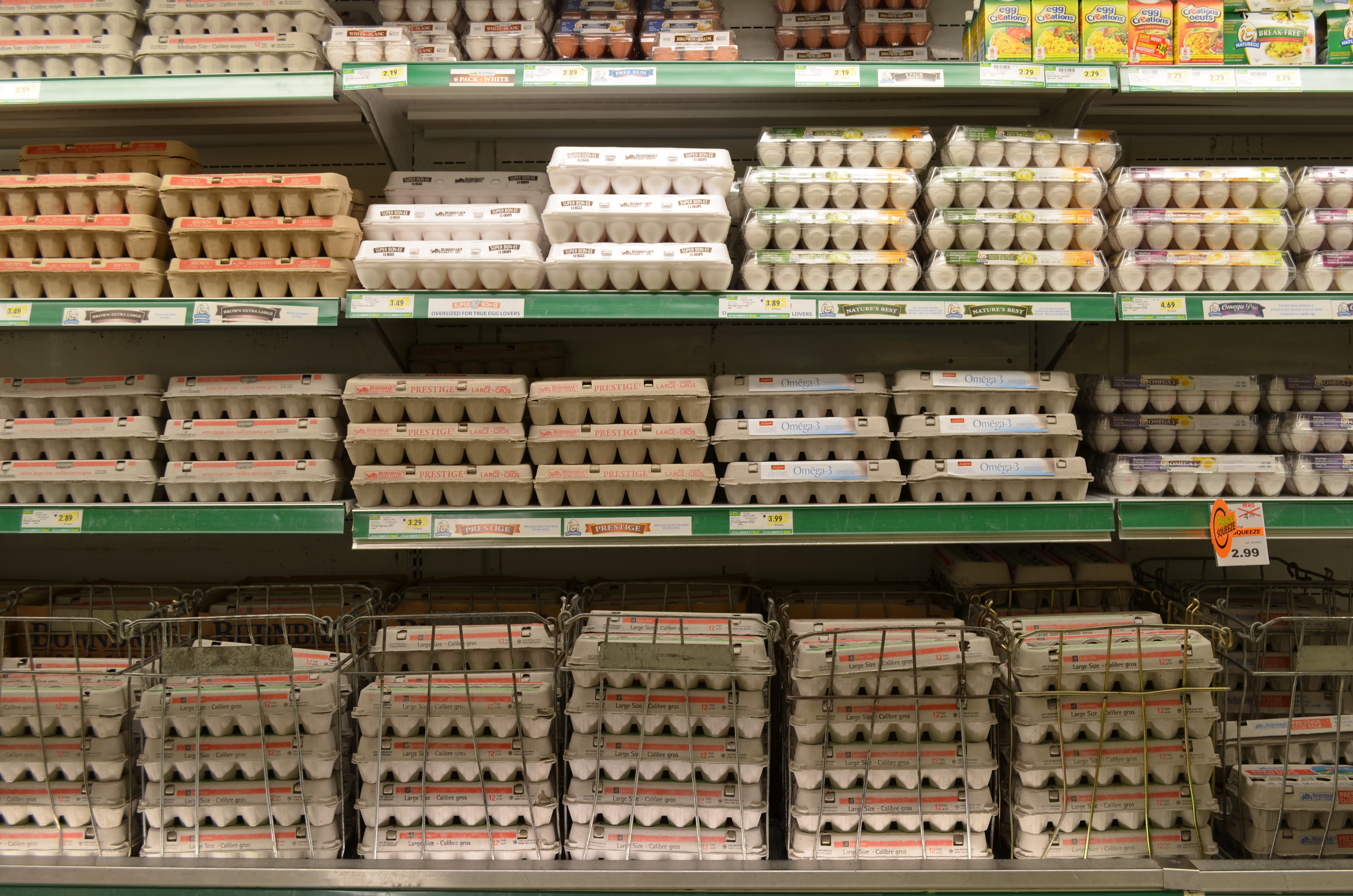
Eggs for sale at a grocery store

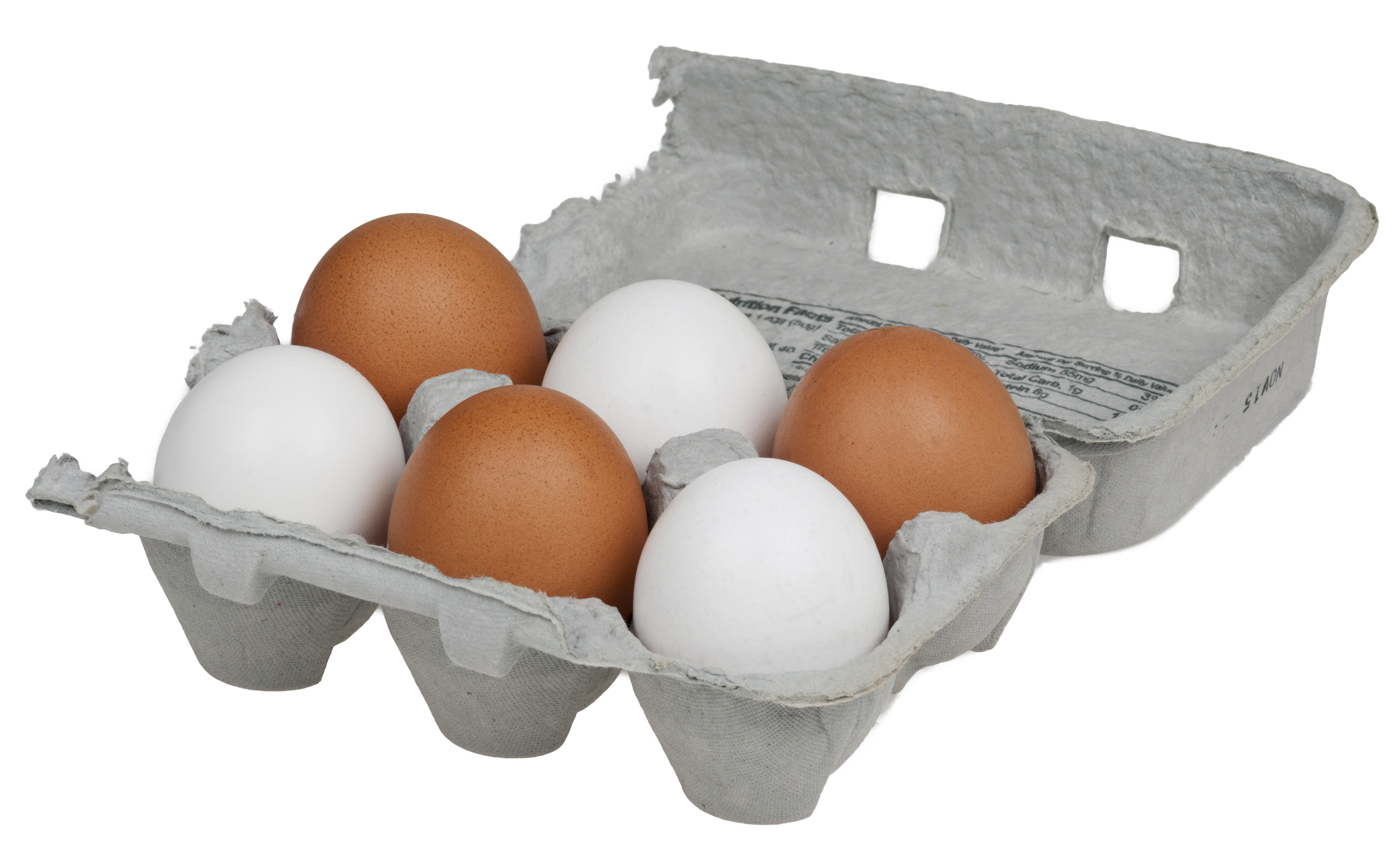
White and brown eggs in an egg crate

Most commercially farmed chicken eggs intended for human consumption are unfertilized, since the laying hens are kept without roosters. Fertile eggs may be eaten, with little nutritional difference when compared to the unfertilized. Fertile eggs will not contain a developed embryo, as refrigeration temperatures inhibit cellular growth for an extended amount of time. An embryo is sometimes allowed to develop, but eaten before hatching as with balut.

=== Grading by quality and size ===
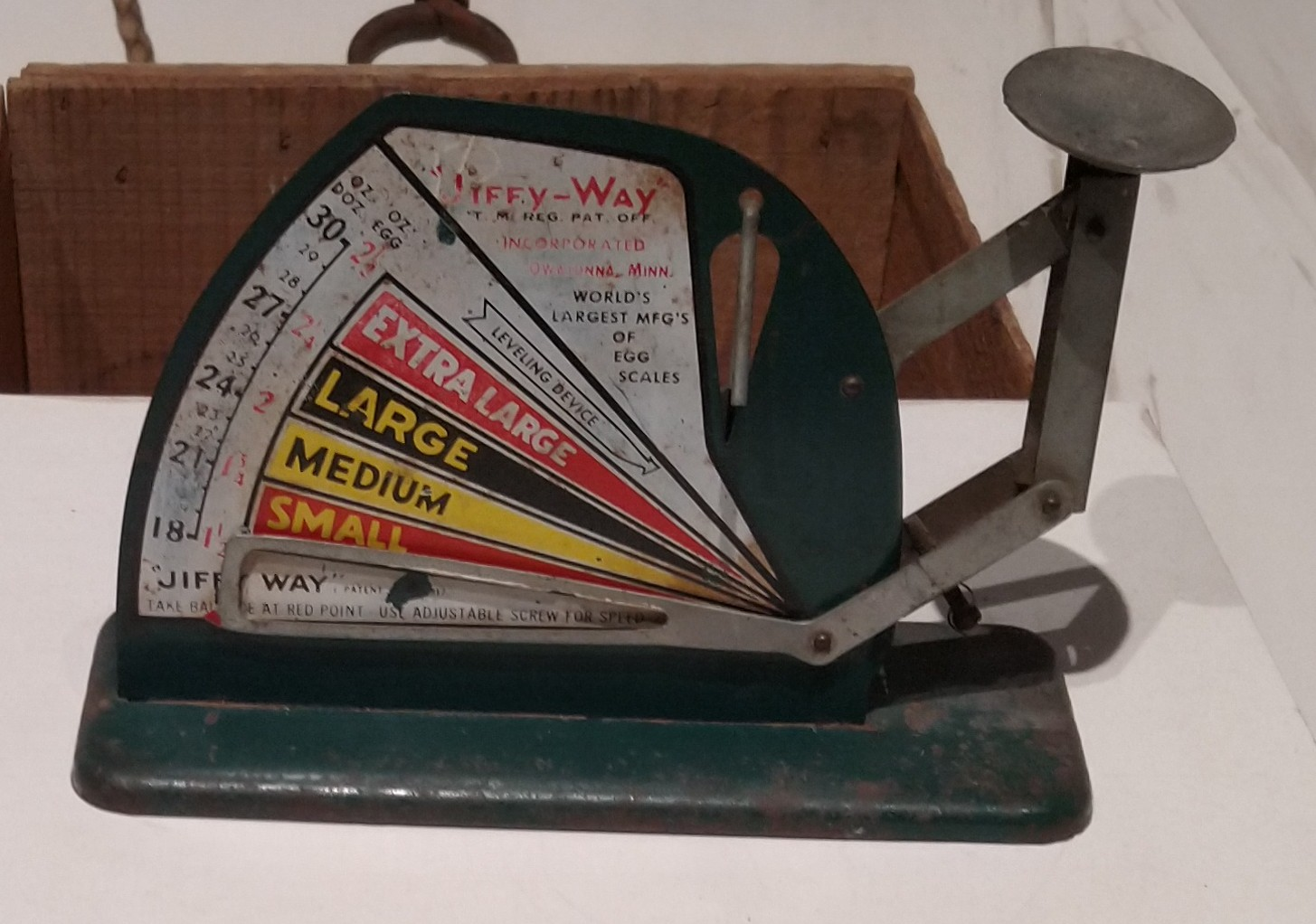
A scale for grading eggs

The U.S. Department of Agriculture grades eggs by the interior quality of the egg (see Haugh unit) and the appearance and condition of the egg shell. Eggs of any quality grade may differ in weight (size). Grade AA and Grade A eggs are best for frying and poaching, where appearance is important.

- U.S. Grade AA
  - Eggs have whites that are thick and firm; have yolks that are high, round, and practically free from defects; and have clean, unbroken shells.
- U.S. Grade A
  - Eggs have characteristics of Grade AA eggs except the whites are "reasonably" firm.
  - This is the quality most often sold in stores.
- U.S. Grade B
  - Eggs have whites that may be thinner and yolks that may be wider and flatter than eggs of higher grades. The shells must be unbroken, but may show slight stains.
  - This quality is rarely found in retail stores because they are typically used to make liquid, frozen, and dried egg products, as well as other egg-containing products.

In Australia and the European Union, eggs are graded by the hen raising method, free range, battery caged, etc.

Chicken eggs are graded by size for the purpose of sales. Some maxi eggs may have double-yolks and some farms separate out double-yolk eggs for special sale.

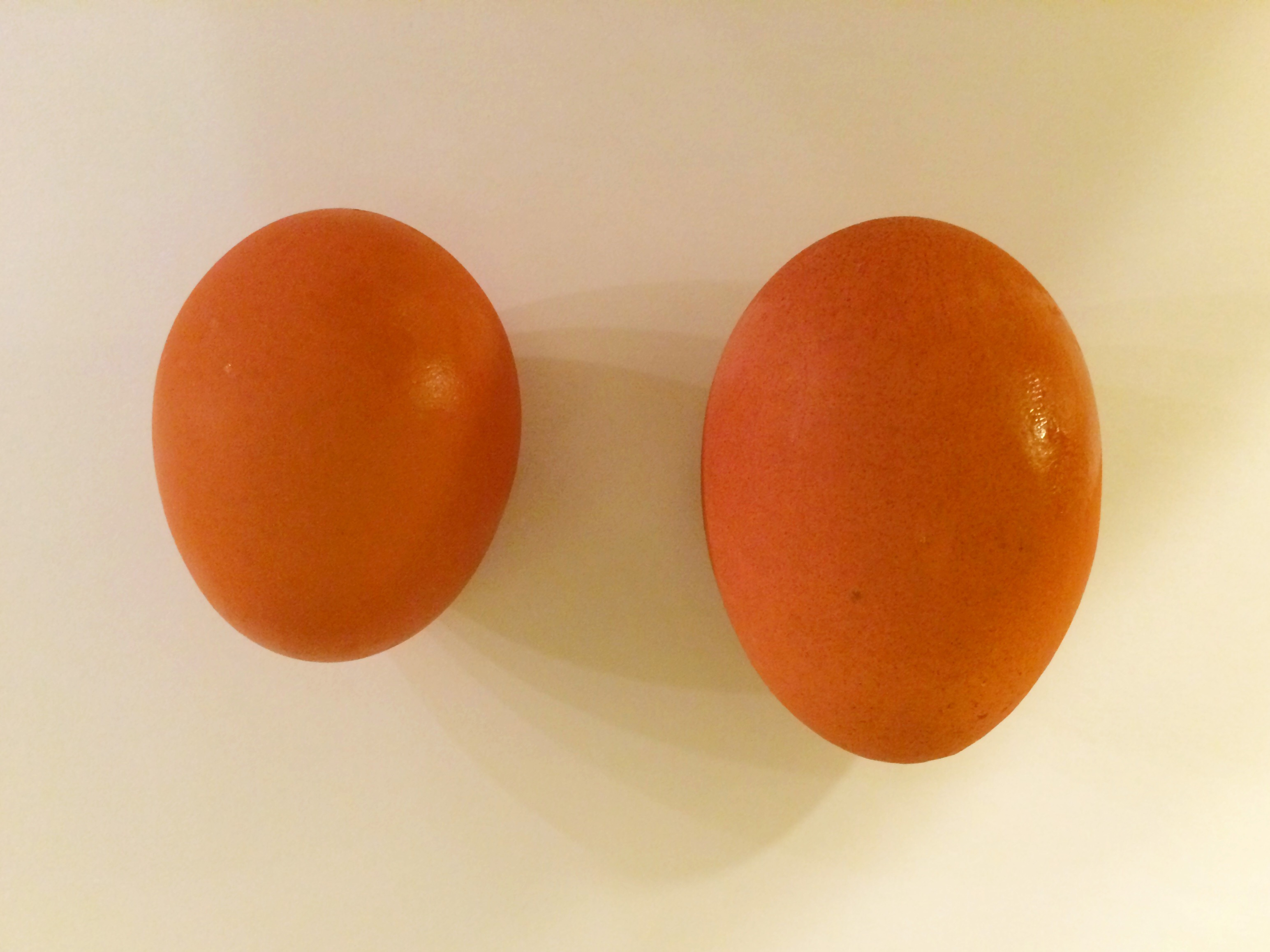
Comparison of an egg and a maxi egg with a double-yolk - closed (1/2)

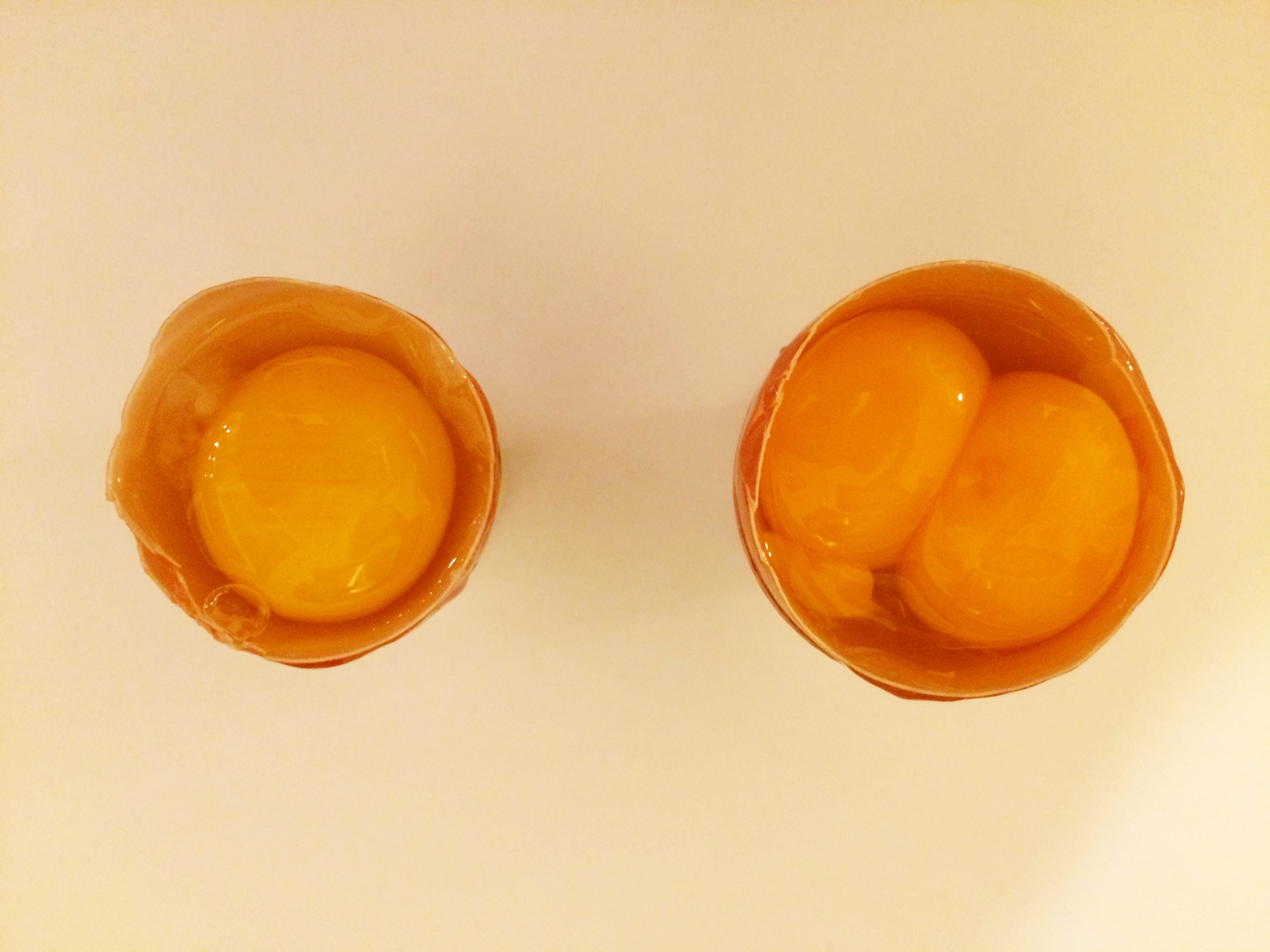
Comparison of an egg and a maxi egg with a double-yolk - opened (2/2)

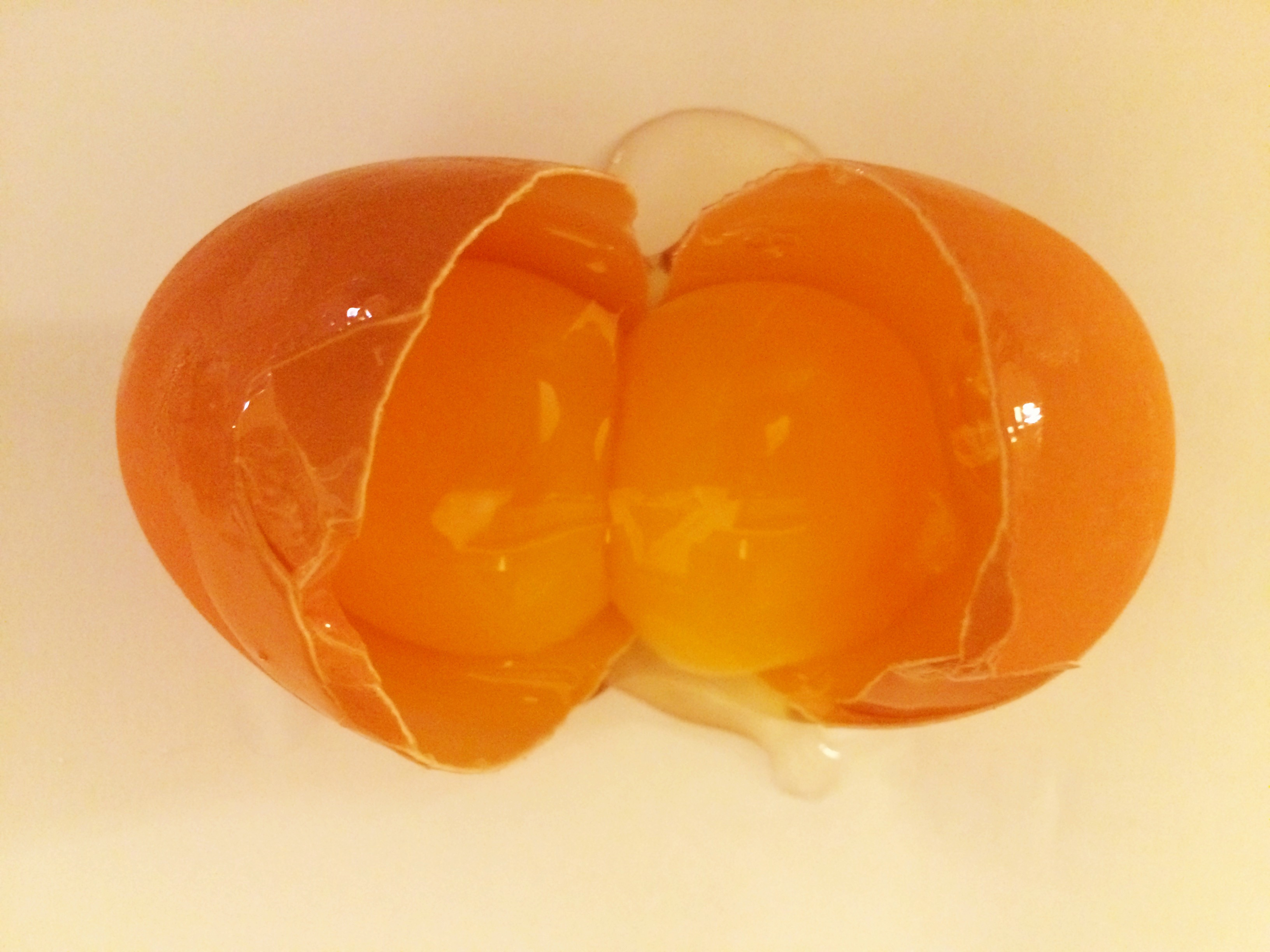
Double-yolk egg - opened

=== Color of eggshell ===
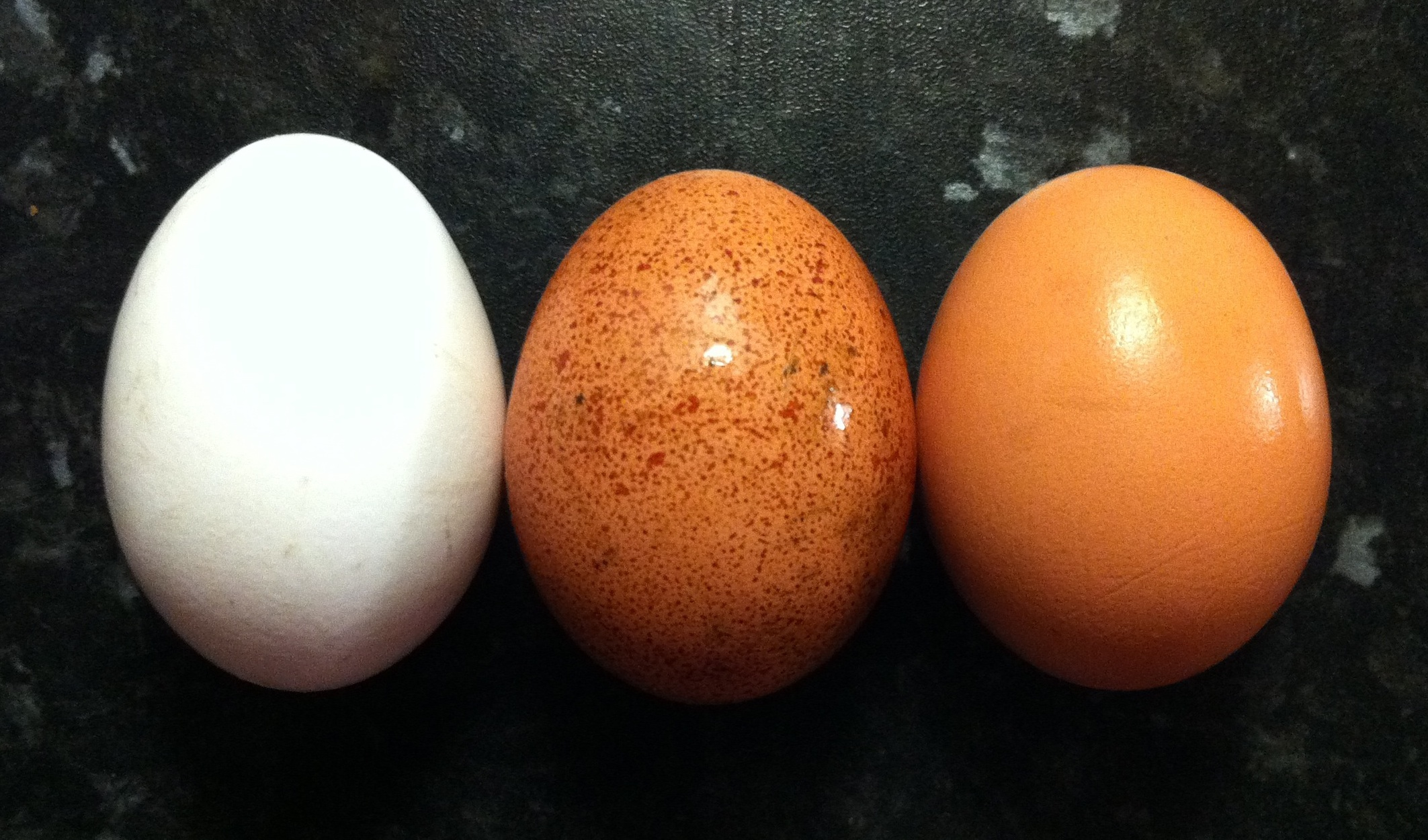
White, speckled (red), and brown chicken eggs

Although eggshell color is a largely cosmetic issue, with no effect on egg quality or taste, it is a major issue in production due to regional and national preferences for specific colors, and the results of such preferences on demand. For example, in most regions of the United States, chicken eggs are generally white. However, brown eggs are more common in some parts of the Northeastern United States, particularly New England, where a television jingle for years proclaimed "brown eggs are local eggs, and local eggs are fresh!". Local chicken breeds, including the Rhode Island Red, lay brown eggs. Brown eggs are preferred in China, Costa Rica, Ireland, France, and the United Kingdom. In Brazil and Poland, white chicken eggs are generally regarded as industrial, and brown or reddish ones are preferred. Small farms and smallholdings, particularly in economically advanced nations, may sell eggs of widely varying colors and sizes, with combinations of white, brown, speckled (red), green, and blue (as laid by certain breeds, including araucanas, heritage skyline, and cream leg bar) eggs in the same box or carton, while the supermarkets at the same time sell mostly eggs from the larger producers, of the color preferred in that nation or region.

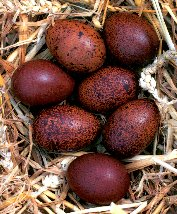
Very dark brown eggs of Marans, a French breed of chicken

These cultural trends have been observed for many years. The New York Times reported during the Second World War that housewives in Boston preferred brown eggs and those in New York preferred white eggs. In February 1976, the New Scientist magazine, in discussing issues of chicken egg color, stated "Housewives are particularly fussy about the colour of their eggs, preferring even to pay more for brown eggs although white eggs are just as good". As a result of these trends, brown eggs are usually more expensive to purchase in regions where white eggs are considered "normal", due to lower production. In France and the United Kingdom, it is very difficult to buy white eggs, with most supermarkets supplying only the more popular brown eggs. By contrast, in Egypt it is very hard to source brown eggs, as demand is almost entirely for white ones, with the country's largest supplier describing white eggs as "table eggs" and packaging brown eggs for export.

Research conducted by a French institute in the 1970s demonstrated blue chicken eggs from the Chilean araucana fowl may be stronger and more resilient to breakage.

Research at Nihon University, Japan, in 1990 revealed that when Japanese housewives were deciding which eggs to buy, color was a distinct factor, with most Japanese housewives preferring the white color.

Egg producers carefully consider cultural issues, as well as commercial ones, when selecting the breed or breeds of chickens used for production, as egg color varies between breeds. Among producers and breeders, brown eggs are often referred to as "tinted", while the speckled eggs preferred by some consumers are often referred to as being "red" in color.

=== Living conditions of birds ===
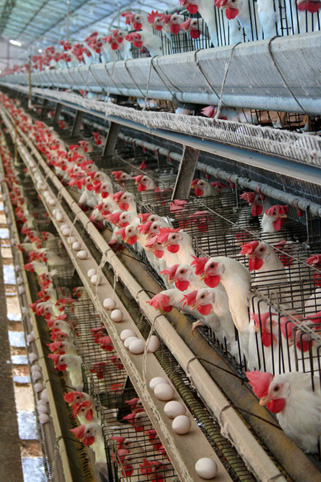
Laying hens in battery cages

Commercial factory farming operations often involve raising the hens in small, crowded cages, preventing the chickens from engaging in natural behaviors, such as wing-flapping, dust-bathing, scratching, pecking, perching, and nest-building. Such restrictions may lead to pacing and escape behavior.

Many hens confined to battery cages, and some raised in cage-free conditions, are debeaked to prevent them from harming each other and engaging in cannibalism. According to critics of the practice, this can cause hens severe pain to the point where some may refuse to eat and starve to death. Some hens may be forced to molt to increase egg quality and production level after the molting. Molting can be induced by extended food withdrawal, water withdrawal, or controlled lighting programs.

Laying hens are often euthanized when reaching 100 to 130 weeks of age, once their egg productivity starts to decline. Due to modern selective breeding, laying hen strains differ from meat production strains. As male birds of the laying strain do not lay eggs and are not suitable for meat production, they are generally killed soon after they hatch.

Free-range eggs are considered by some advocates to be an acceptable substitute to factory-farmed eggs. Free-range laying hens are given outdoor access instead of being contained in crowded cages. Questions regarding the living conditions of free-range hens have been raised in the United States of America, as there is no legal definition or regulations for eggs labeled as free-range in that country.

In the United States, increased public concern for animal welfare has pushed various egg producers to promote eggs under a variety of standards. The most widespread standard in use is determined by United Egg Producers through their voluntary program of certification. The United Egg Producers program includes guidelines regarding housing, food, water, air, living space, beak trimming, molting, handling, and transportation, however, opponents such as The Humane Society have alleged UEP certification is misleading and allows a significant amount of unchecked animal cruelty. Other standards include "Cage Free", "Natural", "Certified Humane", and "Certified Organic". Of these standards, "Certified Humane", which carries requirements for stocking density and cage-free keeping and so on, and "Certified Organic", which requires hens to have outdoor access and to be fed only organic vegetarian feed and so on, are the most stringent.

Effective 1 January 2012, the European Union banned conventional battery cages for egg-laying hens, as outlined in EU Directive 1999/74/EC. The EU permits the use of "enriched" furnished cages that must meet certain space and amenity requirements. Egg producers in many member states have objected to the new quality standards while in some countries, even furnished cages and family cages are subject to be banned as well. The production standard of the eggs is visible on a mandatory egg marking categorization where the EU egg code begins with 3 for caged chicken to 1 for free-range eggs and 0 for organic egg production.

=== Killing of male chicks ===
In all methods of egg production, unwanted male chicks are killed at birth during the process of securing a further generation of egg-laying hens. As of June 2023, this practice has been banned in Germany, France, Luxembourg, and Italy. Some egg producers have begun using in-ovo sexing to analyze the sex of a chick before it hatches, allowing them to remove male eggs from incubation and avoid chick culling. As of April 2025, five companies offer commercially available in-ovo sexing technology, which is used for 28 percent of the European layer population.

== Cultural significance ==
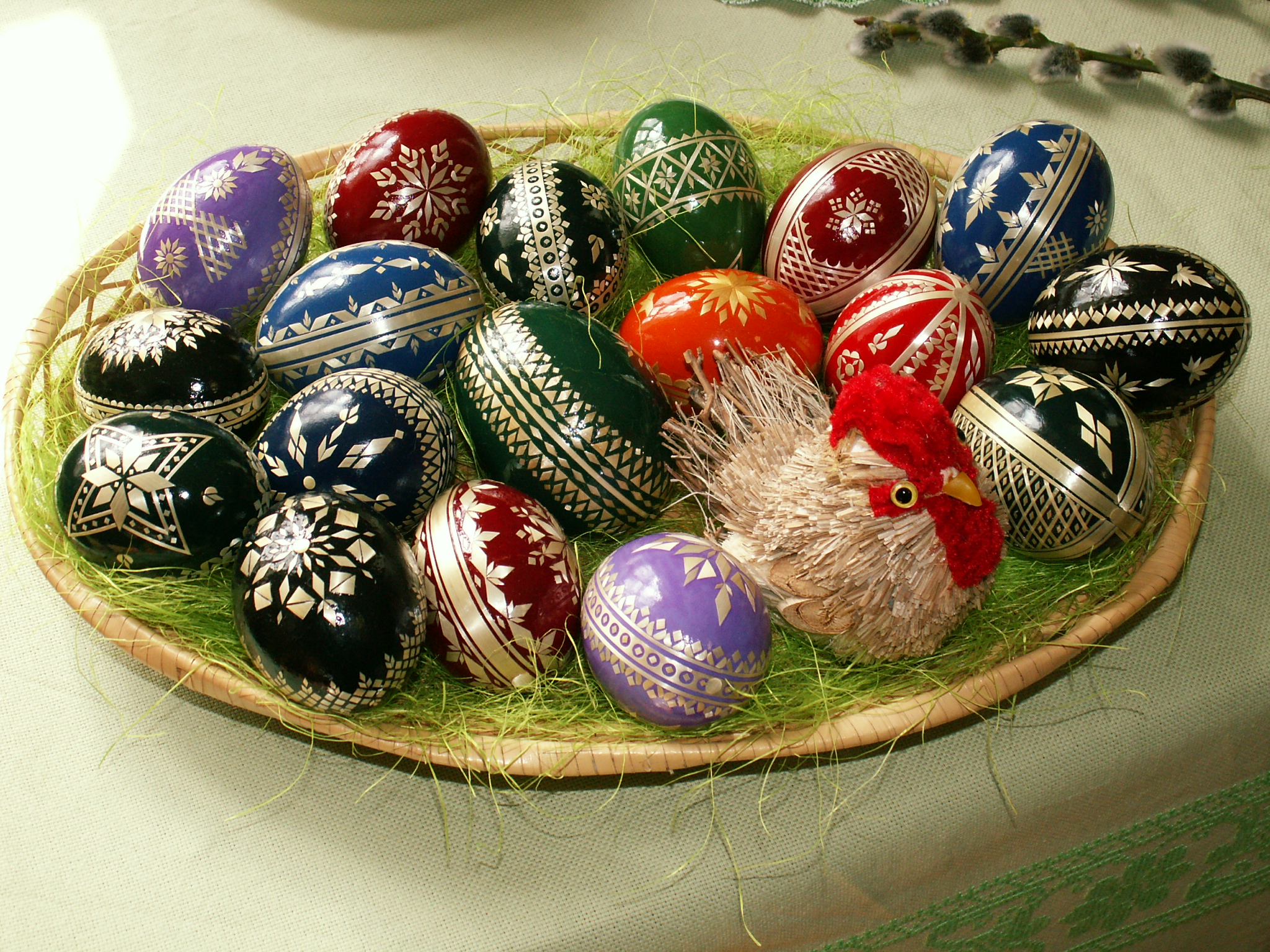
Hanácké kraslice, Easter eggs from the Haná region, the Czech Republic

A popular Easter tradition in some parts of the world is a decoration of hard-boiled eggs (usually by dyeing, but often by spray-painting). A similar tradition of egg painting exists in areas of the world influenced by the culture of Persia. Before the spring equinox in the Persian New Year tradition (called Norouz), each family member decorates a hard-boiled egg and they set them together in a bowl. In Northern Europe and North America, Easter eggs may be hidden by adults for children to find in an Easter egg hunt. They may be rolled in some traditions. In Eastern and Central Europe, and parts of England, easter eggs may be tapped against each other to see whose egg breaks first.

Since the sixteenth century, the tradition of a dancing egg is held during the feast of Corpus Christi in Barcelona and other Catalan cities. It consists of a hollow eggshell, positioned over the water jet from a fountain, which causes the eggshell to revolve without falling.

== See also ==
- Egg substitutes
- Lists of foods
- List of egg dishes
- Fish eggs
- Yolkless egg
- Ham and eggs

== Sources ==
This article incorporates text from a free content work. Licensed under CC BY 4.0 (license statement/permission). Text taken from World Food and Agriculture – Statistical Yearbook 2025, Food and Agriculture Organization of the United Nations.
