= Haugh unit =

Measure of egg protein based on egg white

The Haugh unit is a measure of egg protein quality based on the height of its egg white (albumen). The test was introduced by Raymond Haugh in 1937 and is an important industry measure of egg quality next to other measures such as shell thickness and strength.

An egg is weighed, then broken onto a flat surface (breakout method), and a micrometer used to determine the height of the thick albumen (egg white) that immediately surrounds the yolk. The height, correlated with the weight, determines the Haugh unit, or HU, rating. The higher the number, the better the quality of the egg (fresher, higher quality eggs have thicker whites). Although the measurement determines the protein content and freshness of the egg, it does not measure other important nutrient contents such as the micronutrient or vitamins present in the egg.

== Formula ==
The formula for calculating the Haugh unit is:

$$HU = 100 * log(h-1.7w^{0.37} + 7.6)$$

Where:

- HU = Haugh unit
- h = observed height of the albumen in millimeters
- w = weight of egg in grams

Haugh Index :

AA : 72 or more

A : 71 - 60

B : 59 - 31

C : 30 or less

Below are the USDA's terms describing egg white and its corresponding Haugh unit:

(a) Clear. A white that is free from discolorations or from any foreign bodies floating in it. (Prominent chalazas should not be confused with foreign bodies such as spots or blood clots.)

(b) Firm (AA quality). A white that is sufficiently thick or viscous to prevent the yolk outline from being more than slightly defined or indistinctly indicated when the egg is twirled. With respect to a broken-out egg, a firm white has a Haugh unit value of 72 or higher when measured at a temperature between 45$^o$F and 60$^o$F.

(c) Reasonably firm (A quality). A white that is somewhat less thick or viscous than a firm white. A reasonably firm white permits the yolk to approach the shell more closely which results in a fairly well defined yolk outline when the egg is twirled. With respect to a broken-out egg, a reasonably firm white has a Haugh unit value of 60 up to, but not including, 72 when measured at a temperature between 45$^o$F and 60$^o$F.

(d) Weak and watery (B quality). A white that is weak, thin, and generally lacking in viscosity. A weak and watery white permits the yolk to approach the shell closely, thus causing the yolk outline to appear plainly visible and dark when the egg is twirled. With respect to a broken-out egg, a weak and watery white has a Haugh unit value lower than 60 when measured at a temperature between 45$^o$F and 60$^o$F.

    - Excerpt from United States Department of Agriculture (USDA)

United States Standards, Grades, and Weight Classes for Shell Eggs, AMS 56, Effective July 20, 2000
