= Parvoblongoolithus =

Parvoblongoolithus Temporal range: Maastrichtian

Egg fossil classification
- Oofamily: incertae sedis
- Oogenus: †Parvoblongoolithus

Oospecies
- †P. jinguoensis Zhang et al. 2015 (type)

Parvoblongoolithus is an oogenus of fossil dinosaur egg whose small size and unusual shape suggest the possibility that it is a dwarf egg.

== Distribution ==
The sole known Parvoblongoolithus jinguoensis specimen was found in the Upper Cretaceous Chichengshan Formation in Tiantai County, Zhejiang.

== Description ==
Parvoblongoolithus known from only a single specimen. It is relatively small (measuring 45.5 mm (1.79 in) long by 34.4 mm (1.35 in) wide) with an asymmetrical shape, similar to modern bird eggs. The eggshell is 1.12 mm thick, with the barrel-shaped cones of the mammillary layer making up one-fifth of the total eggshell thickness. The pore system is prolatocanaliculate, meaning the pores vary in width along their length. The pore canals are thick and irregularly shaped. The outer surface of the eggshell is smooth.

Despite having a bird-like shape and size, the P. jinguoensis has a very different microstructure, which bears a closer resemblance to non-avian dinosaur eggs than bird eggs. Most significantly, all known Cretaceous bird eggs have a three-layered eggshell, whereas the eggshell of Parvoblongoolithus is two-layered. Additionally, its pore system is prolatocanaliculate, unlike the angusticanaliculate pores of bird eggs (such as Laevisoolithidae or Gobioolithidae) and its microstructures are much more similar to those of stalicoolithids, Mosaicoolithus, and Paraspheroolithus.

== Palaeobiology ==
Since no skeletal remains were associated with its remains, the parentage of Parvoblongoolithus is unknown. However, its microstructure suggests it was laid by some kind of non-avian dinosaur, related to the parents of Stalicoolithidae, Paraspheroolithus, or Mosaicoolithus.

Parvoblongoolithus is remarkable for having an extremely thick shell (as thick as the shell of titanosaur eggs) despite being significantly smaller than its close relatives. This would have made it much more difficult for a baby dinosaur to break out of the egg without parental assistance. It is possible that Parvoblongoolithus actually represents a fossil dwarf egg, a type of deformity occasionally observed in modern birds when a disturbance of the oviducts causes them to form a small, deformed egg. This would explain both the thick eggshell and unique shape of P. jinguoensis.

== Parataxonomy ==
Parvoblongoolithus has not been classified into any oofamily. The eggshell resembles the spherulitic type, but it lacks the radial-tabular ultrastructure. It is closely related to Paraspheroolithus, Mosaicoolithus, and stalicoolithids.
