= Chicken egg sizes =

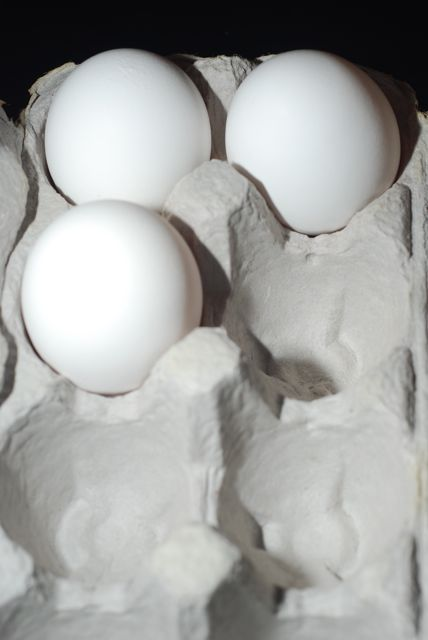
Medium white eggs in carton

Chicken eggs are sized by weight, for the purpose of sales. The egg shell constitutes 8–9% of the weight of the egg (calculated from data in Table 2, F. H. Harms).

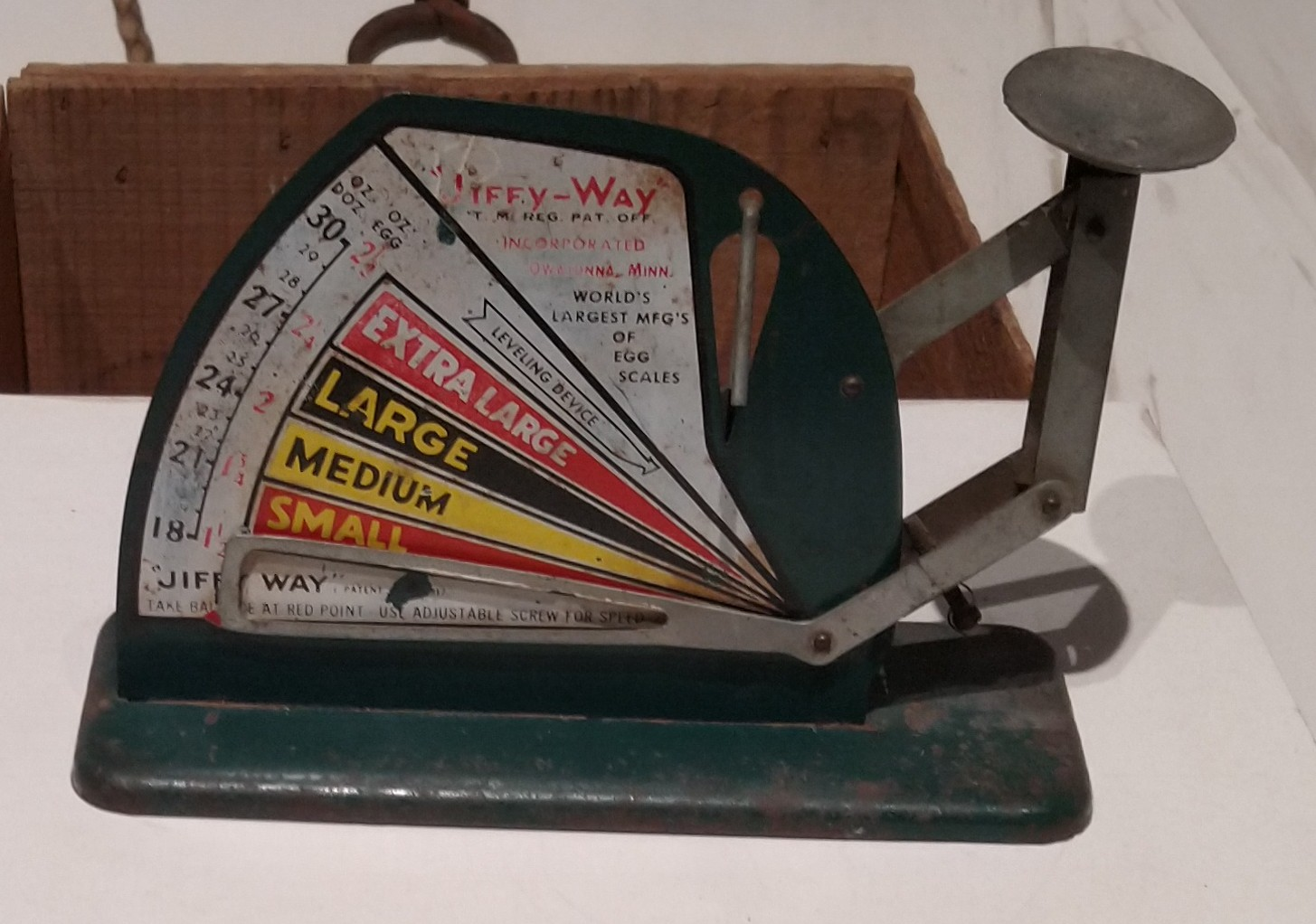
A scale for grading eggs.

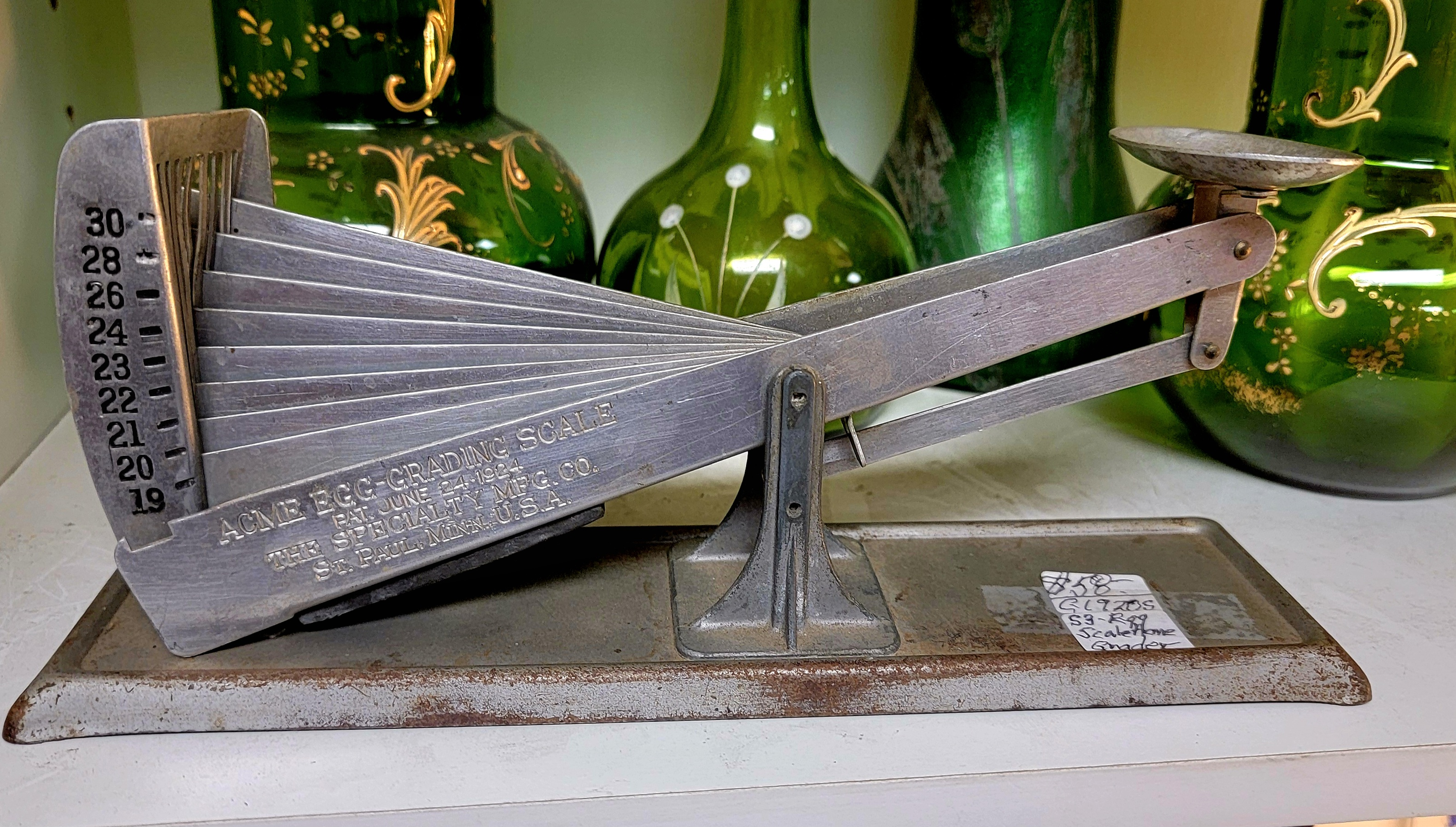
An egg scale that was patented in 1924

== Animal welfare ==
According to Tom Vasey, chair of the British Free Range Producers' Association, laying larger eggs is painful for the hen. He recommends shoppers only to buy eggs of medium or smaller sizes. Christine Nicol of the University of Bristol, a professor of animal welfare, said "There is no strong evidence of pain in egg-laying hens but it's not unreasonable to think there may be a mismatch in the size of birds and the eggs they produce. We do often spot bloodstains on large eggs."

== United States ==
The United States Department of Agriculture sizing is based by weight per dozen. The most common U.S. size of chicken egg is 'Large' and is the egg size commonly referred to for recipes.

The following egg masses including shell have been calculated on the basis of the USDA sizing per dozen:

Modern Sizes (U.S.)
Size	Minimum mass per egg		Cooking Yield (Volume)
Jumbo	70.9 g	2.5 oz.	61 ml (4.125 tbsp)
Very Large or Extra-Large (XL)	63.8 g	2.25 oz.	56 ml (4 tbsp)
Large (L)	56.8 g	2 oz.	46 ml (3.25 tbsp)
Medium (M)	49.6 g	1.75 oz.	43 ml (3 tbsp)
Small (S)	42.5 g	1.5 oz.	
Peewee	35.4 g	1.25 oz.	

== Canada ==
In Canada, modern egg sizes are defined as follows:

Modern Sizes (Canada)
Size	Minimum mass per egg
Jumbo	70 g
Extra Large	63 g
Large	56 g
Medium	49 g
Small	42 g
Peewee	—N/a

== Europe ==
In Europe, modern egg sizes are defined as follows.

Size	Mass range per egg
Extra large (XL)	≥ 73 g
Large (L)	≥ 63 g and < 73 g
Medium (M)	≥ 53 g and < 63 g
Small (S)	< 53 g

== Post-Soviet countries ==
In countries which are members of Interstate Council for Standardization, Metrology and Certification: Russia, Belarus, Moldova, Kazakhstan, Azerbaijan, Armenia, Kyrgyzstan, Uzbekistan, Tajikistan, Georgia, and Turkmenistan eggs are sorted into five categories by mass:

Category	Mass range per egg
Highest (В)	> 75 g
Select (О)	65 g – 74.9 g
First (1)	55 g – 64.9 g
Second (2)	45 g – 54.9 g
Third (3)	35 g – 44.9 g

== Australia ==
In Australia, the Australian Egg Corporation defines the following sizes in its labeling guide.

Modern Sizes (Australia)
Size	Pack weight (12 eggs)	Mass range per egg	Average mass per egg	Edible portion per egg
King-size	860 g	71.7 g – 78.5 g	73 g	64 g
Jumbo	800 g	66.7 g – 71.6 g	68 g	59 g
Extra-Large	700 g	58.3 g – 66.6 g	60 g	52 g
Large	600 g	50.0 g – 58.2 g	52 g	45 g
Medium	500 g	41.7 g – 49.9 g	43 g	37 g

== New Zealand ==
In New Zealand, sizes are based on the minimum mass per egg. Current sizing introduced in 1973; prior to 1973, sizes were based on the minimum mass per dozen eggs in ounces: 15 (now 4), 18 (now 5), 22 (now 6) and 26 (now 7).

Modern Sizes (New Zealand)
Size	Minimum mass per egg
Jumbo (8)	68 g
Large (7)	62 g
Standard (6)	53 g
Medium (5)	44 g
Pullet (4)	35 g

== Brazil ==
In Brazil sizes are based on the mass:

Sizes (Brazil)
Size	
Jumbo	> 68 g
Extra	58 g to 67.99 g
Large (Grande)	48 g to 57.99 g
Medium (Médio)	38 g to 47.99 g

== Thailand ==
In Thailand sizes are based on minimum mass per egg.

Sizes (Thailand)
No.	Size	Minimum mass per egg
0	Jumbo	> 70 g
1	Extra large	65 g to 70 g
2	Large	60 g to 65 g
3	Medium	55 to 60 g
4	Small	50 g to 55 g
5	Peewee	45 g to 50 g

== Japan ==
In Japan, the Japan Egg Association lists the following sizes:

Sizes (Japan)
Size	Mass per egg
LL	70 g to 76 g
L	64 g to 70 g
M	58 g to 64 g
MS	52 g to 58 g
S	46 g to 52 g
SS	40 g to 46 g

== South Africa ==
In South Africa sizes are based on the mass. :

Sizes (South Africa)
Size	
Super Jumbo	> 72 g
Jumbo	> 66 g
Extra-Large	> 59 g
Large	> 51 g
Medium	> 43 g
Small	> 33 g
