= Yolkless egg =

Small egg not containing a yolk

A yolkless egg is a small egg with no yolk, sometimes produced by a pullet that has only just started laying. These eggs are common and usually pose no harm.

The eggs can also be called fart eggs, cock eggs, fairy eggs, dwarf eggs, and witch eggs. The name wind eggs is also sometimes used, but this term more often refers to eggs without a shell, or with a soft shell, and less often to eggs that are rotten or unfertilized.

== Cause ==
A yolkless egg is most often a pullet's first egg, produced before her laying mechanism is fully ready. In a mature hen, a yolkless egg is unlikely, but can occur if a bit of reproductive tissue breaks away, stimulating the egg-producing glands to treat it as a yolk and wrap it in albumen, membranes and a shell as it travels through the egg tube. In cases of an egg that contains a small particle of grayish tissue instead of a yolk, this is what has occurred. This type of egg occurs in many varieties of fowl, including chickens (both standard and bantams), guineafowl, and Japanese quail (Coturnix).

== Etymology ==
Since they contain no yolk and therefore cannot hatch, yolkless eggs were traditionally believed to be laid by cocks. This gave rise to the myth that when a cock's egg was hatched, it would produce a cockatrice, a fearsome serpent which could kill with its evil stare. According to the superstition, this could be prevented by throwing the egg over the family dwelling so it smashed on the other side without touching the roof.

== In other animals ==
Leatherback sea turtles are known to lay large clutches of viable eggs interspersed with yolkless eggs. This may be due to too much albumen, or it may function to separate viable eggs from each other and thereby improve gas exchange.

The fossilized egg classified parataxonomically as Parvoblongoolithus may represent an instance of a yolkless egg in an unknown species of dinosaur.
