= Chalaza =

Structure inside bird eggs and plant ovules

The chalaza (/kəˈleɪzə/; from Ancient Greek χάλαζα (khálaza) 'hailstone'; pl.: chalazas or chalazae /kəˈleɪzi/) is a structure inside bird eggs and plant ovules. It attaches or suspends the yolk or nucellus within the larger structure.

== In animals ==
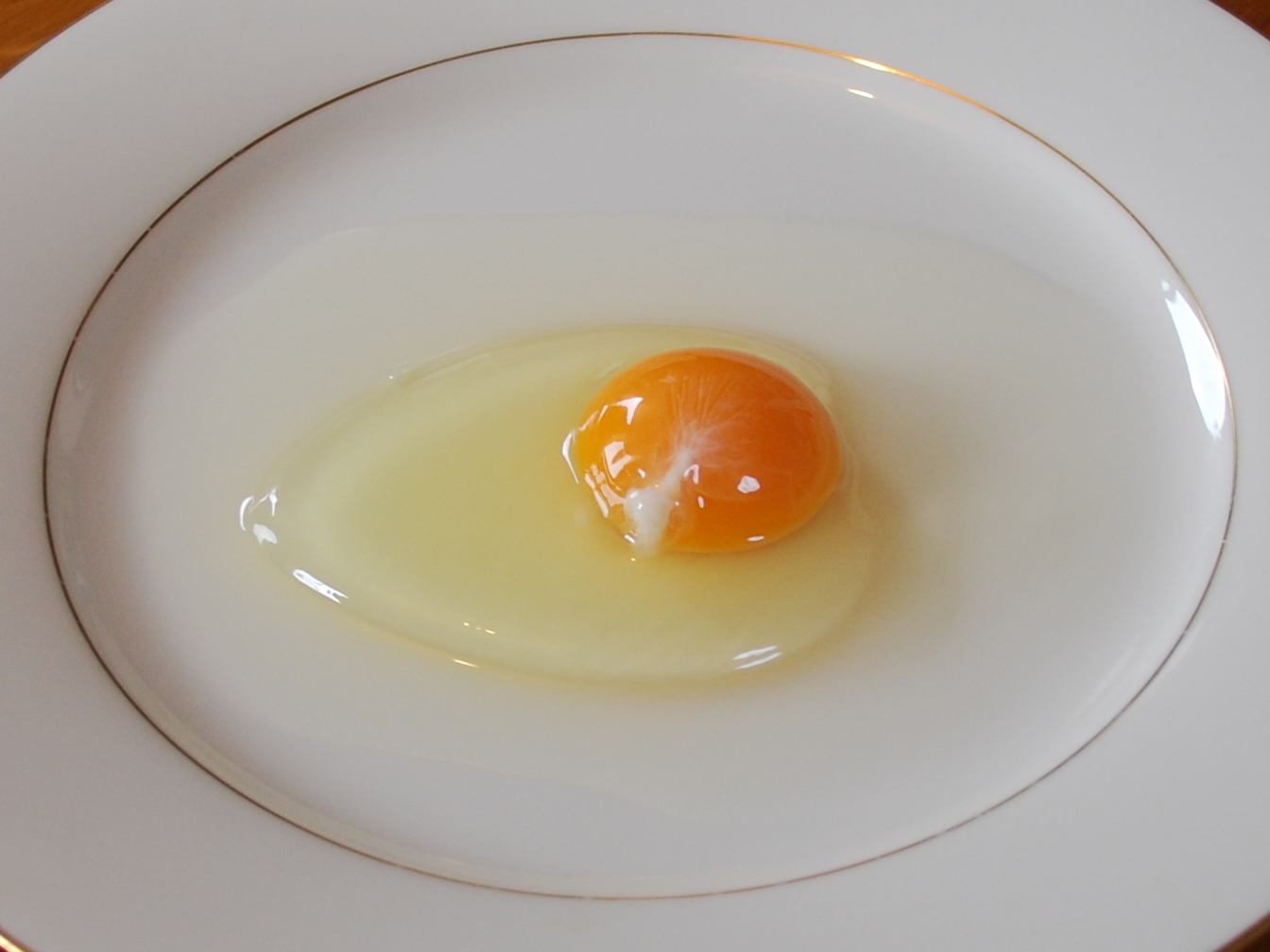
The contents of a chicken egg with chalaza clearly visible.

In the eggs of most birds (though not in eggs of reptiles), the chalazae are two spiral bands of tissue that suspend the yolk in the center of the white (the albumen). The function of the chalazae is to hold the yolk in place. In baking, the chalazae are sometimes removed in order to ensure a uniform texture.

== In plants ==
In plant ovules, the chalaza is located opposite the micropyle opening of the integuments. It is the tissue where the integuments and nucellus are joined. Nutrients from the plant travel through vascular tissue in the funiculus and outer integument through the chalaza into the nucellus. During the development of the embryo sac inside a flowering plant ovule, the three cells at the chalazal end become the antipodal cells.

Diagram of angiosperm ovule showing location of chalaza

=== Chalazogamy ===
In most flowering plants, the pollen tube enters the ovule through the micropyle opening in the integuments for fertilization (porogamy). In chalazogamous fertilization, the pollen tubes penetrate the ovule through the chalaza rather than the micropyle opening. Chalazogamy was first discovered in monoecious plant species of the family Casuarinaceae by Melchior Treub, but has since then also been observed in others, for example in pistachio and walnut.
