= Gannanoolithus =

Gannanoolithus Temporal range: Late Cretaceous Maastrichtian

Egg fossil classification
- Kingdom: Animalia
- Phylum: Chordata
- Class: Reptilia
- Clade: Dinosauria
- Clade: Saurischia
- Clade: Theropoda
- Family: incertae sedis
- Oogenus: †Gannanoolithus; Wu et al., 2024

Oospecies
- †G. yingliangi Wu et al., 2024 (type)

Oogenus of dinosaur egg

Gannanoolithus (meaning "Gannan stone egg") is an oogenus of dinosaur eggs likely laid by a dromaeosaurid theropod. It contains a single oospecies, G. yingliangi, known from the Late Cretaceous (Maastrichtian) Lianhe Formation of Jiangxi Province, China.

== Etymology ==
The generic name, Gannanoolithus, combines "Gannan", an alternate name of Ganzhou City where the fossils were found, with the suffix "‑oolithus", meaning "stone egg". The specific name, yingliangi, honors the Yingliang Stone Natural History Museum, where the fossils are housed. The authors also used the binomial variation "Ganzhouoolithus yingliangensis" in a figure in their publication.

== Description ==
The Gannanoolithus holotype specimen, YLSNHM 01579, consists of a clutch of eight eggs. Specimens CUGW EH067-1 (a single egg) and EH067-2 (a pair of eggs) were also referred to the oogenus. All of the known fossil eggs have been found in layers of the Lianhe Formation in the Shahe Industrial Zone of Ganzhou City in Jiangxi Province, China. The eggs are symmetrically elliptic, ranging in size from 120–133 millimetres (4.7–5.2 in) long. The eggshells are 0.56–0.65 millimetres (0.022–0.026 in) thick. Similar to the preserved eggshells of Deinonychus-like maniraptoran theropods, they demonstrate an angusticanaliculate pore system. The porosity of Gannanoolithus eggs is similar to that of extant crocodilians and galliforms, whose nests are typically covered.

== Paleobiology ==
Due to similarities with North American fossil eggs, Gannanoolithus eggs were likely laid by a dromaeosaurid. Notably, the eggs are paired in the holotype clutch, which has been observed in some other ootaxa. This may indicate that the egg layer had paired functional oviducts, as has been suggested for troodontids and oviraptorosaurs.

== Parataxonomy ==
In their phylogenetic analyses, Wu et al. (2024) found Gannanoolithus to occupy an uncertain position in relation to other dinosaur ootaxa. They recovered it in a polytomy of other theropod eggs which is the sister taxon to oviraptorosaur eggs, most of which belong to the Elongatoolithidae. Their results are displayed in the cladogram below:

- - Egg of Maiasaura
  - - Spheroolithus spheroids
    - Paraspheroolithus irenensis
    - - - Egg of Torvosaurus
        - - Megaloolithus rahioliensis
          - Megaloolithus mammilare
          - Egg of titanosaurs
      - - Faveoloolithus ningxianensis
        - - Egg of therizinosaurs
          - - Dendroolithus wangdianensis
            - - Arraigadoolithus patagoniensis
              - Triprismatoolithus stephensi
              - Trigonoolithus armoae
              - Preprismatoolithus coloradensis
              - Egg of Lourinhanosaurus
              - - - Sankofa pyrenaica
                  - Protoceratopsidovum sincerum
                  - Prismatoolithus gebiensis
                  - Avialae
                    - Gobioolithus minor
                    - Parvoolithus tortuosus
                  - - Egg of Troodon
                    - Prismatoolithus levis
                  - - Ellipsoolithus khedaensis
                    - Nipponoolithus ramosus
                    - Gannanoolithus yingliangi
                    - Montanoolithus labadousensis
                    - Montanoolithus strongorum
                    - Paraelongatoolithus reticulatus
                    - Reticuloolithus acicularis
                    - Reticuloolithus hirschi
                    - Egg of Deinonychus
                    - Oviraptorosauria
                      - Nanhsiungoolithus chuetienensis
                      - - Luanchuan eggshells
                        - Macroelongatoolithus carlylei
                        - Macroelongatoolithus xixiaensis
                        - Egg of Beibeilong
                        - Egg of small oviraptorids
                        - Elongatoolithus elongatus
                        - Macroolithus rugustus
