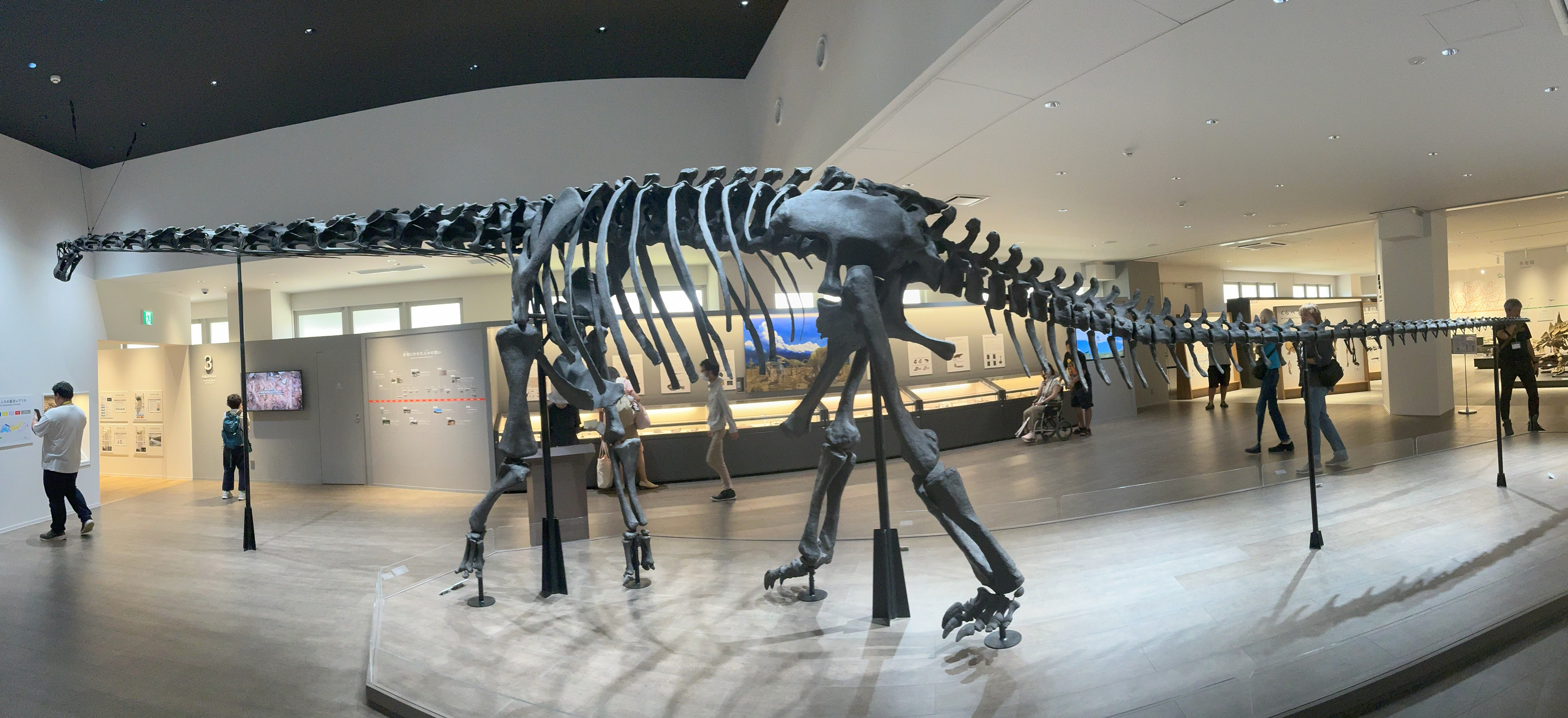
- Skeletal mount in Tamba Dinosaur Museum, Japan

Scientific classification
- Kingdom: Animalia
- Phylum: Chordata
- Class: Reptilia
- Clade: Dinosauria
- Clade: Saurischia
- Clade: †Sauropodomorpha
- Clade: †Sauropoda
- Clade: †Eusauropoda
- Clade: †Macronaria
- Clade: †Titanosauria
- Genus: †Tambatitanis; Saegusa & Ikeda, 2014

Type species
- †Tambatitanis amicitiae Saegusa & Ikeda, 2014

= Tambatitanis =

Tambatitanis Temporal range: Early Cretaceous, 112.6–109.0 Ma Albian

Genus of titanosauriform sauropod dinosaur

Tambatitanis (meaning "Tamba giant", after Tamba, the name given to the northwest of Kansai, Japan) is an extinct genus of titanosauriform, possibly titanosaurian, sauropod dinosaur from the Lower Cretaceous (lower Albian) Ohyamashimo Formation of the Sasayama Group. It is known from a single species, Tambatitanis amicitiae, known from a partial skeleton.

== Discovery and naming ==
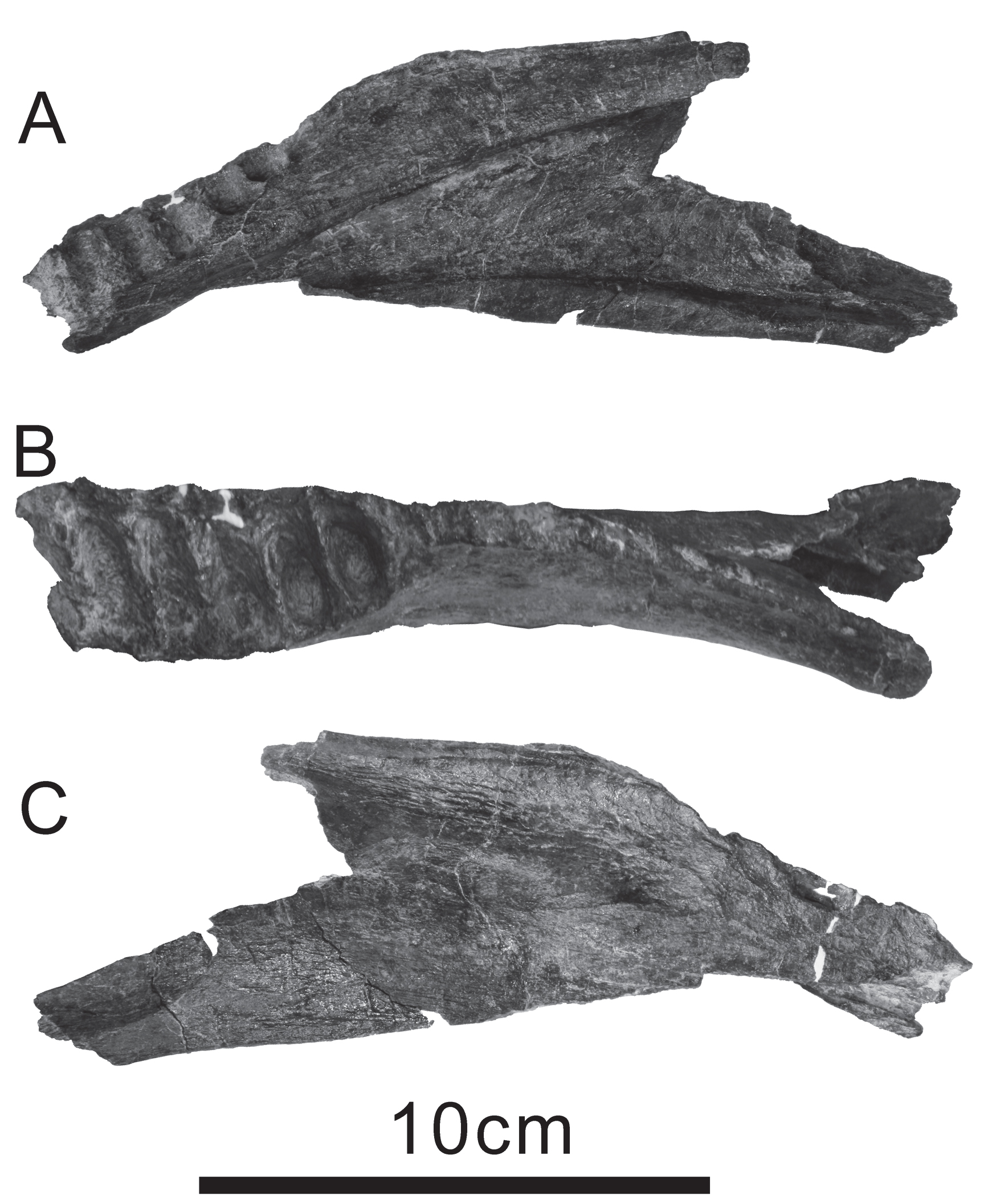
Dentary

The holotype specimen of the Tambaitanis, MNHAH D-1029280 was initially discovered in August 2006, by Shigeru Murakami and Kiyoshi Adachi in the reddish mudstone bed of the Ohyamashimo Formation (Lower Formation of the Sasayama Group) on a riverbed of the Sasayama RIver in Kamitaki, Sannan-Cho, Tamba-Sasayama city, of Hyōgo Prefecture, Japan. It took five field seasons, from 2006 to 2010 to excavate a fossil because access to the skeleton was only available during the winter when the water level of the river becomes lowest. It was originally called 'Tamba-Ryu' before the publication in 2014. The specimen is somewhat semi-articulated and includes teeth, a braincase, a dentary, an atlas, a fragmental cervical vertebra, dorsal ribs, two fragmental dorsal vertebrae, a pubis, an ilium, sacral spines, presumable first sacral ribs, 22 caudal vertebrae, and 17 chevrons.

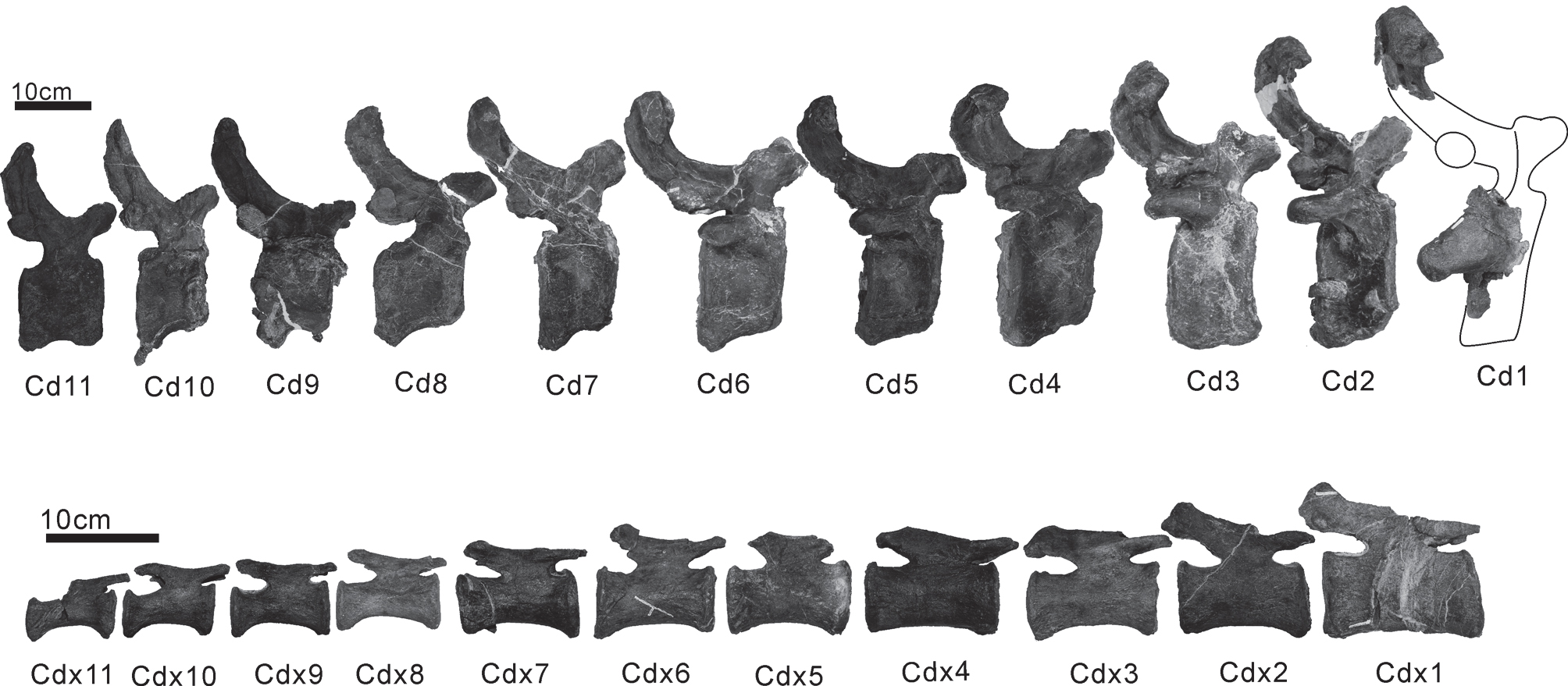
Caudal vertebrae

In 2014, Haruo Saegusa and Tadahiro Ikeda described Tambatitanis amicitiae as a new genus and species of titanosauriform sauropod based on these remains. The generic name Tambatitanis is derived from the words, Tamba, the city where the fossil was discovered, with the Ancient Greek word "titanis", meaning titan. The specific name, amicitiae was derived from the Latin word "amicitia", referring to the friendship between 2 discoverers of this fossil.

== Classification ==
Phylogenetic analysis from Saegusa and Ikeda (2014) suggests Tambatitanis was Euhelopodidae, but its specific placement is uncertain among this group due to polytomy shown in the matrix, which is mainly based on D'Emic (2012). In contrast, the describers of Ruixinia recovered this taxon within Titanosauria based on their phylogenetic analysis in 2023, the cladogram of which can be seen below:

- Titanosauriformes
  - Brachiosauridae
  - Somphospondyli
    - - Huanghetitan spp.
      - - - Ligabuesaurus
          - Dongbeititan
        - - Savannasaurus
          - - Chubutisaurus
            - Angolatitan
      - - Europatitan
        - Tastavinsaurus
        - - Liubangosaurus
          - - Euhelopodidae
            - - Jiangshanosaurus
              - Titanosauria
                - - Tambatitanis
                  - - Huabeisaurus
                    - Dongyangosaurus
                    - Andesaurus
                - - Mongolosaurus
                  - - - Vahiny
                      - Jainosaurus
                    - - Ruyangosaurus
                      - - - Ruixinia
                          - - Xianshanosaurus
                            - Daxiatitan
                        - - - Rinconsaurus
                            - Muyelensaurus
                          - - - Mendozasaurus
                              - - - Argentinosaurus
                                  - Futalognkosaurus
                                - - Puertasaurus
                                  - - Patagotitan
                                    - Notocolossus
                            - - Lithostrotia

== Paleoecology ==
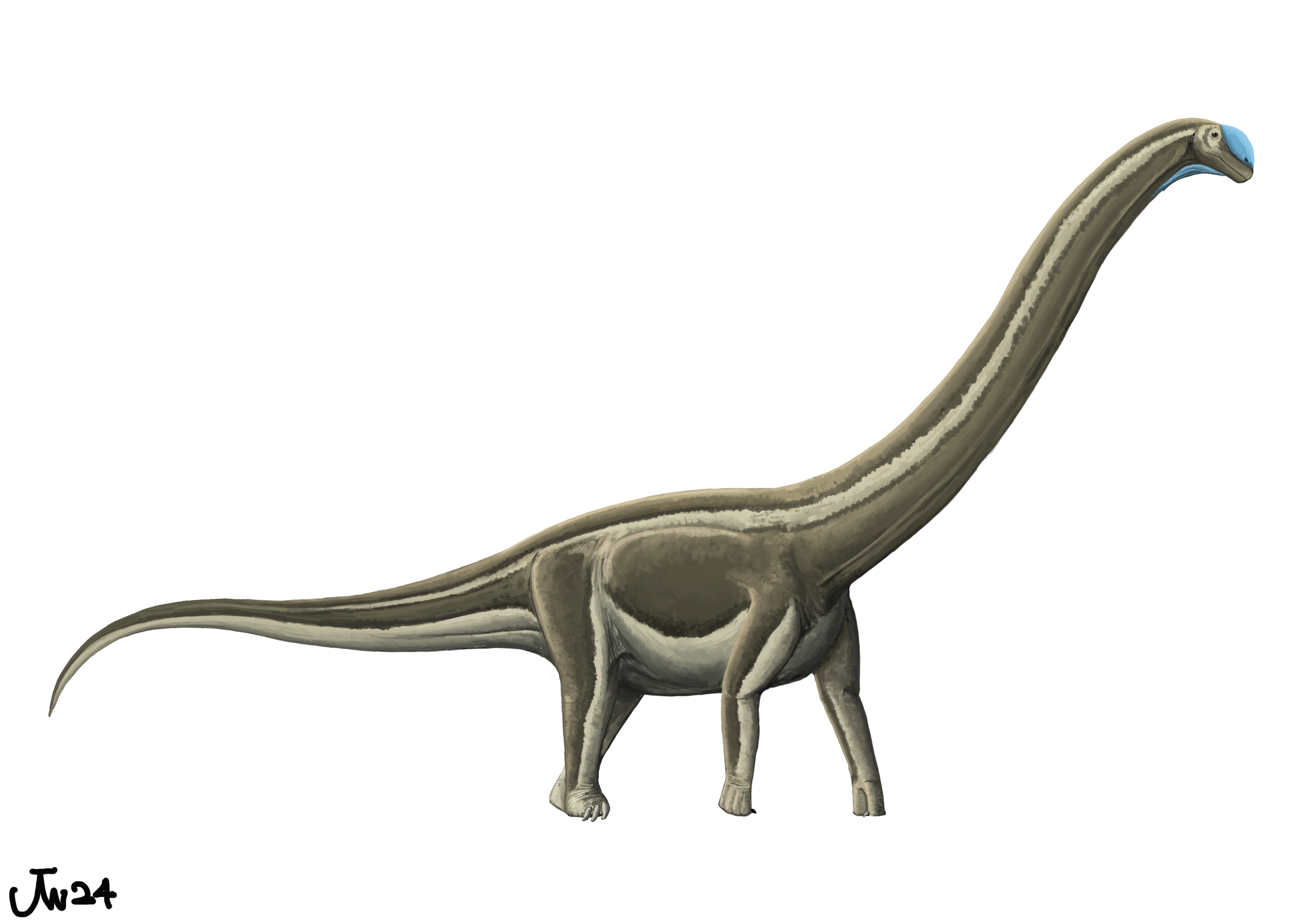
Life reconstruction of Tambatitanis

Tambatitanis is known from the Ohyamashimo Formation (Sasayama Group), which dates to the early–middle Albian age from the end of the Early Cretaceous. These layers are predominantly made up by sandstones, mudstones, and conglomerates. The depositional environment represents a fluvial system with a subhumid to semi-arid climate. Dinosaur teeth are common in various localities throughout this formation including those belonging to other theropods (dromaeosaurids, therizinosaurs, and tyrannosauroids) as well as sauropods, ankylosaurs, and iguanodontians. Several dinosaurian oospecies (egg fossils) have also described, including Himeoolithus, Subtiliolithus, Nipponoolithus, and Prismatoolithus. The monstersaurian lizard Morohasaurus and the troodontid theropod Hypnovenator are known from the formation. Fossils of an unnamed neoceratopsian, including several skull bones, are also known from the formation. Although not specified as this Formation in original descriptions, Sasayama Group have some other fossil fauna known, such as eutherian Sasayamamylos, scincomorph Pachygenys, two frogs Hyogobatrachus and Tambabatrachus.
