= Ohyamashimo Formation =

Geologic formation in Japan

- Stratigraphic range: Albian; ~112.1–106.4 Ma
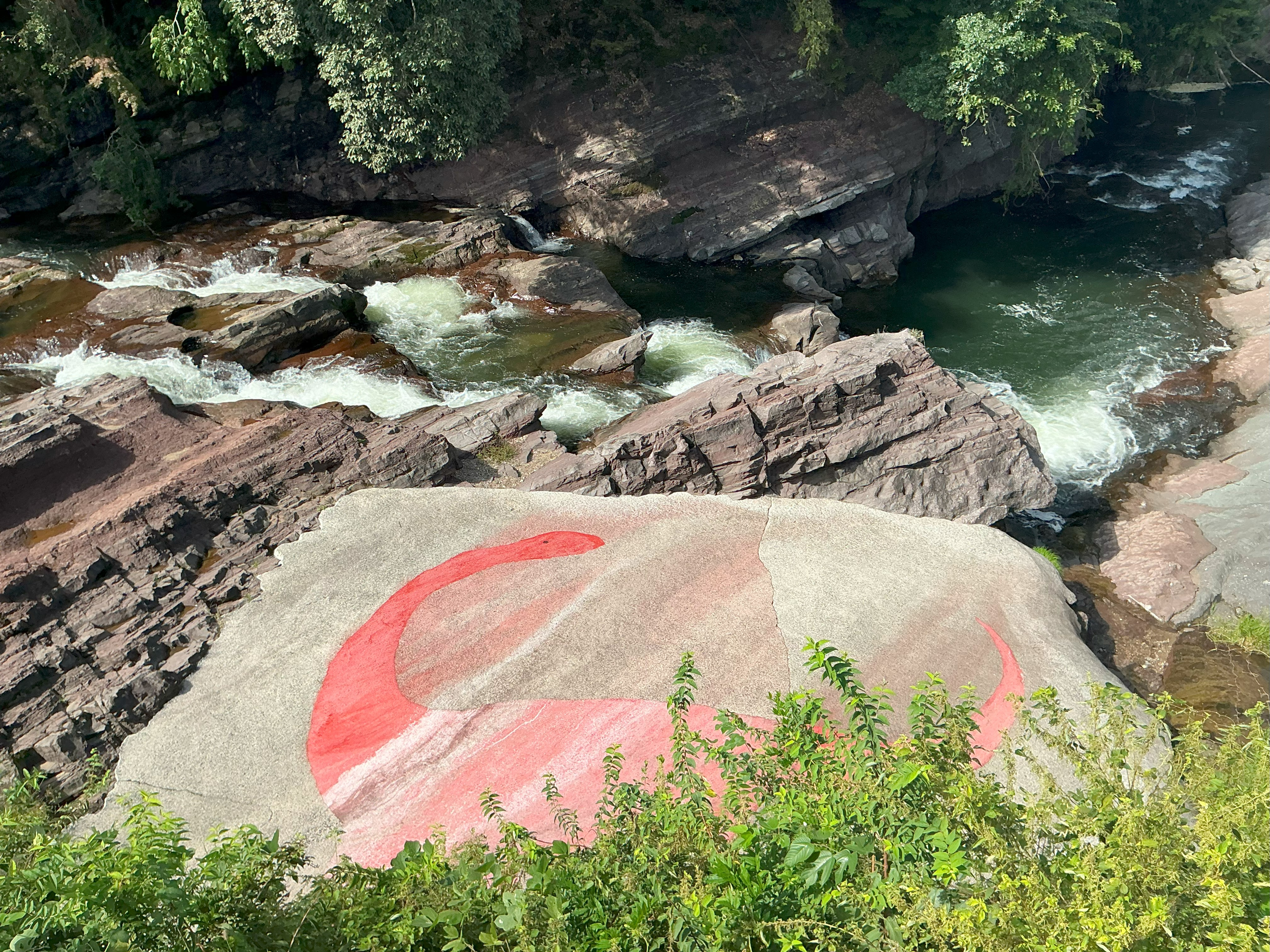
- Kamitaki Bonebed Quarry, currently covered by concrete for protection.
- Type: Geological formation
- Unit of: Sasayama Group
- Underlies: Sawada Formation
- Overlies: Basement (Unconformity)
- Thickness: 1,300 metres

Lithology
- Primary: Conglomerate, Sandstone, Mudstone
- Other: Tuff

Location
- Coordinates: 35.1°N 135.1°E
- Approximate paleocoordinates: 47.9°N 132.8°E
- Region: Hyōgo Prefecture
- Country: Japan

Type section
- Named for: Ohyamashimo, Tamba-Sasayama
- Named by: Hayashi et al., 2017
- Ohyamashimo Formation (Japan)

The Ohyamashimo Formation(大山下層) is a Lower Cretaceous (Albian) geologic formation, distributed in Tamba and Tamba-Sasayama, Hyogo Prefecture, Japan. It has been dated to the early-mid Albian, between 112.1 ± 0.4 Ma and 106.4 ± 0.4 Ma. The depositional environment represents a fluvial system with a subhumid to semi-arid climate. The Ohyamashimo Formation was called the 'Lower Formation' of the Sasayama Group before it was named in 2017.

== Fossil content ==
Color key: Taxon / Reclassified taxon / Taxon falsely reported as present / Dubious taxon or junior synonym / Ichnotaxon / Ootaxon / Morphotaxon	Notes; Uncertain or tentative taxa are in small text; ~~crossed out~~ taxa are discredited.

=== Dinosaurs ===
==== Ornithischians ====
Ornithischians of the Ohyamashimo Formation
Genus	Species	Location	Stratigraphic position	Material	Notes	Images
Ankylosauria Indet.	Indeterminate	Kamitaki Bonebed Quarry, Tamba	Albian	Dental remains.		
Iguanodontia Indet.	Indeterminate	Kamitaki Bonebed Quarry, Tamba	Albian	Dental remains.		
Sasayamagnomus	S. saegusai	Miyada microvertebrate site, Tamba-Sasayama	Albian	Skull elements and partial postcranial remains.	A neoceratopsian; closely related to Aquilops americanus.	

==== Saurischians ====
===== Sauropods =====
Sauropods of the Ohyamashimo Formation
Genus	Species	Location	Stratigraphic position	Material	Notes	Images
Tambatitanis	T. amicitiae	Kamitaki Bonebed Quarry, Tamba	Albian	A single partial skeleton.	A titanosauriform sauropod	

===== Theropods =====
Indeterminate theropod dental remains are known from the Kamitaki Bonebed Quarry, Tamba.

Theropods of the Ohyamashimo Formation
Genus	Species	Location	Stratigraphic position	Material	Notes	Images
Hypnovenator	H. matsubaraetoheorum	Nishikosa, Tamba-Sasayama	Albian	A single partial skeleton.	A troodontid theropod; closely related to Gobivenator mongoliensis.	
Therizinosauria Indet.	Indeterminate	Kamitaki Bonebed Quarry, Tamba	Albian	Dental remains.		
Tyrannosauroidea Indet.	Indeterminate	Kamitaki Bonebed Quarry, Tamba	Albian	Dental remains.		

=== Squamates ===
Squamtes of the Ohyamashimo Formation
Genus	Species	Location	Stratigraphic position	Material	Notes	Images
Morohasaurus	M. kamitakiensis	Kamitaki Egg Quarry, Tamba	Albian	A nearly complete left dentary.	A monstersaurian lizard	
Pachygenys	P. adachii	Miyada microvertebrate site, Tamba-Sasayama	Albian	A single, partially broken right mandible	A scincomorphan lizard	

=== Amphibians ===
Amphibian of the Ohyamashimo Formation
Genus	Species	Location	Stratigraphic position	Material	Notes	Images
Hyogobatrachus	H. wadai	Kamitaki Bonebed Quarry, Tamba	Albian	A nearly complete skeleton.	A frog	
Tambabatrachus	T. kawazu	Kamitaki Bonebed Quarry, Tamba	Albian	An articulated skeleton lacking the anterior part of the skull, most of the pectoral girdle, manus, and feet.	A frog	

=== Mammals ===
Mammals of the Ohyamashimo Formation
Genus	Species	Location	Stratigraphic position	Material	Notes	Images
Sasayamamylos	S. kawaii	Miyada microvertebrate site, Tamba-Sasayama	Albian	Three dentaries.	A asioryctitherian eutherian	

=== Crustaceans ===
Crustaceans of the Ohyamashimo Formation
Genus	Species	Location	Stratigraphic position	Material	Notes	Images
Mongolocypris	M. sp.		Albian		A ostracod	
Conchostraca Indet.	Indeterminate		Albian		A clam shrimp	

=== Molluscs ===
==== Bivalves ====
Bivalves of the Ohyamashimo Formation
Genus	Species	Location	Stratigraphic position	Material	Notes	Images
Sphaerium	S. coreanicum		Albian		A sphaeriid bivalve	

==== Gastropods ====
Gastropods of the Ohyamashimo Formation
Genus	Species	Location	Stratigraphic position	Material	Notes	Images
Viviparus	V. cf. keishoensis		Albian		A viviparid gastropod	

=== Oofossils ===
Oofossils of the Ohyamasimo Formation
Genus	Species	Location	Stratigraphic position	Material	Notes	Images
Elongatoolithus	E. sp.	Kamitaki Bonebed Quarry, Tamba			Likely laid by oviraptorosaur	
Himeoolithus	H. murakamii	Kamitaki Egg Quarry, Tamba			Likely laid by a small theropod	
Nipponoolithus	N. ramosus	Kamitaki Bonebed Quarry and Kamitaki Egg Quarry, Tamba			Likely laid by non-avian maniraptoran theropod	
Prismatoolithus	P. sp.	Kamitaki Bonebed Quarry and Kamitaki Egg Quarry, Tamba			Likely laid by either troodontids or birds	
Subtiliolithus	S. hyogoensis	Kamitaki Bonebed Quarry and Kamitaki Egg Quarry, Tamba			Likely laid by a small theropod	
Spheroolithus	S. sp.	Kamitaki Bonebed Quarry, Tamba			Likely laid by hadrosaurs or other ornithopods	
