= Lianhe Formation =

Geologic formation in Jiangxi, China

Lianhe formation
- Stratigraphic range: Late Cretaceous, Maastrichtian
- Type: Geological formation
- Unit of: Guifeng Group
- Underlies: Xinyu Formation and Chijiang Formation
- Overlies: Tangbian Formation

Lithology
- Primary: Conglomerate
- Other: Sandstone, Siltstone,Mudstone

Location
- Region: Jiangxi
- Country: China

Type section
- Coordinates: 28°16′00″N 117°40′6″E
- Lianhe Formation (China) Lianhe Formation (Jiangxi)

The Lianhe Formation is a geological formation in Jiangxi Province, eastern China. It dates to the Maastrichtian age of the end of the Cretaceous period. Dinosaur bones and eggs, fossil turtles, gastropods, and pollen have been recovered from the formation. The Lianhe Formation is part of the larger Guifeng Group.

== Fossil content ==
Color key: Taxon / Reclassified taxon / Taxon falsely reported as present / Dubious taxon or junior synonym / Ichnotaxon / Ootaxon / Morphotaxon	Notes; Uncertain or tentative taxa are in small text; ~~crossed out~~ taxa are discredited.

=== Dinosaurs ===
==== Ornithischians ====
Ornithischians of the Lianhe Formation
Genus	Species	Location	Stratigraphic position	Material	Notes	Image
Gongshuilong	G. fanwei			Disarticulated cranial and postcranial bones of at least two individuals.	A brachylophosaurin saurolophine	

=== Turtles ===
Turtles of the Lianhe Formation
Genus	Species	Location	Stratigraphic position	Material	Notes	Image
Xianyuechelys	X. yingliangi			A carapace.	A nanhsiungchelyid turtle	

=== Molluscs ===
==== Gastropods ====
Gastropods of the Lianhe Formation
Genus	Species	Location	Stratigraphic position	Material	Notes	Image
Viviparus	V. sp.					
Reesidella	R. sp.					
Rubeyella	R. carinata					
Trancatella	T. maxima					

=== Oofossils ===
Oofossils of the Lianhe Formation
Genus	Species	Location	Stratigraphic position	Material	Notes	Image
Elongatoolithus	E. elongates				Likely laid by oviraptorosaurs	
Macroolithus	M. rugustus				Laid by oviraptorosaurs	
Spheroolithus	S. sp.					
Gannanoolithus	G. yingliangi				Laid by a dromaeosaurid	

=== Plants ===
Plants of the Lianhe Formation
Genus	Species	Location	Stratigraphic position	Material	Notes	Image
Ginkgo	G. sp.					
Leiotriletes	L. sp.					
Osmunda	O. sp.					
Pinus	P. sp.					
Podocarpus	P. sp.					
Polypodium	P. sp.					
Pterocarya	P. sp.					
