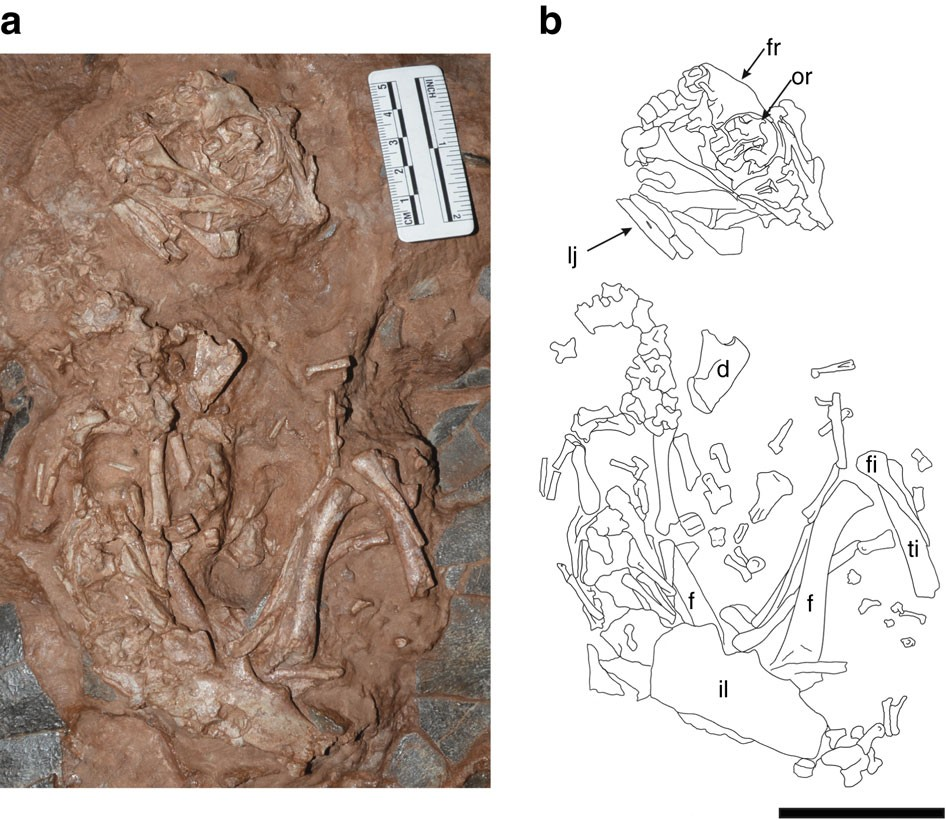
- Skeleton and line drawing of Baby Louie

Scientific classification
- Kingdom: Animalia
- Phylum: Chordata
- Class: Reptilia
- Clade: Dinosauria
- Clade: Saurischia
- Clade: Theropoda
- Superfamily: †Caenagnathoidea
- Family: †Caenagnathidae
- Genus: †Beibeilong; Pu et al., 2017

Type species
- †Beibeilong sinensis Pu et al., 2017

= Beibeilong =

Beibeilong Temporal range: Late Cretaceous (Cenomanian-Coniacian), ~96–88 Ma

Caenagnathid dinosaur genus from the Late Cretaceous

Beibeilong (Chinese: 贝贝龙, transl. baby dragon) is a genus of large caenagnathid dinosaurs that lived in China during the Late Cretaceous epoch, about 96 million to 88 million years ago. The genus contains a single species, Beibeilong sinensis. The species was named and described in 2017 through analysis of an embryonic skeleton (nicknamed Baby Louie) and partial nest with large eggs that were discovered in the Gaogou Formation of China (Henan Province) between 1992 and 1993.

Beibeilong was a notably large caenagnathid and among the largest oviraptorosaurs, estimated at 7.5 m (25 ft) long (extrapolated from the large embryo and eggs) with a ponderous weight of about 1.5–2 metric tons (1.7–2.2 short tons), based on comparisons with the closely related Gigantoraptor. Its jaws—in a similar fashion to most other oviraptorosaurs—were toothless and developed a horny beak (also known as rhamphotheca). Most of the anatomical traits of Beibeilong are consistent with caenagnathids rather than oviraptorids, another diverse oviraptorosaur family. Within Caenagnathidae it occupies a basal (primitive) position.

Beibeilong laid one of the largest known types of dinosaur eggs, Macroelongatoolithus. Its eggs measured around 40–45 cm (16–18 in) in length and had ruggedly ornamented eggshell surfaces. The typical Macroelongatoolithus nest was ring-shaped with one or two layers of eggs, and the center was largely devoid of eggs. Giant caenagnathids (like Beibeilong) may have sat directly in the empty center to avoid egg-crushing because of their massive body dimensions. The paleoenvironments in which Beibeilong lived consisted of relatively mesic (humid, well-watered) floodplains crossed by rivers with semi-arid to tropical climates.

== History of discovery ==
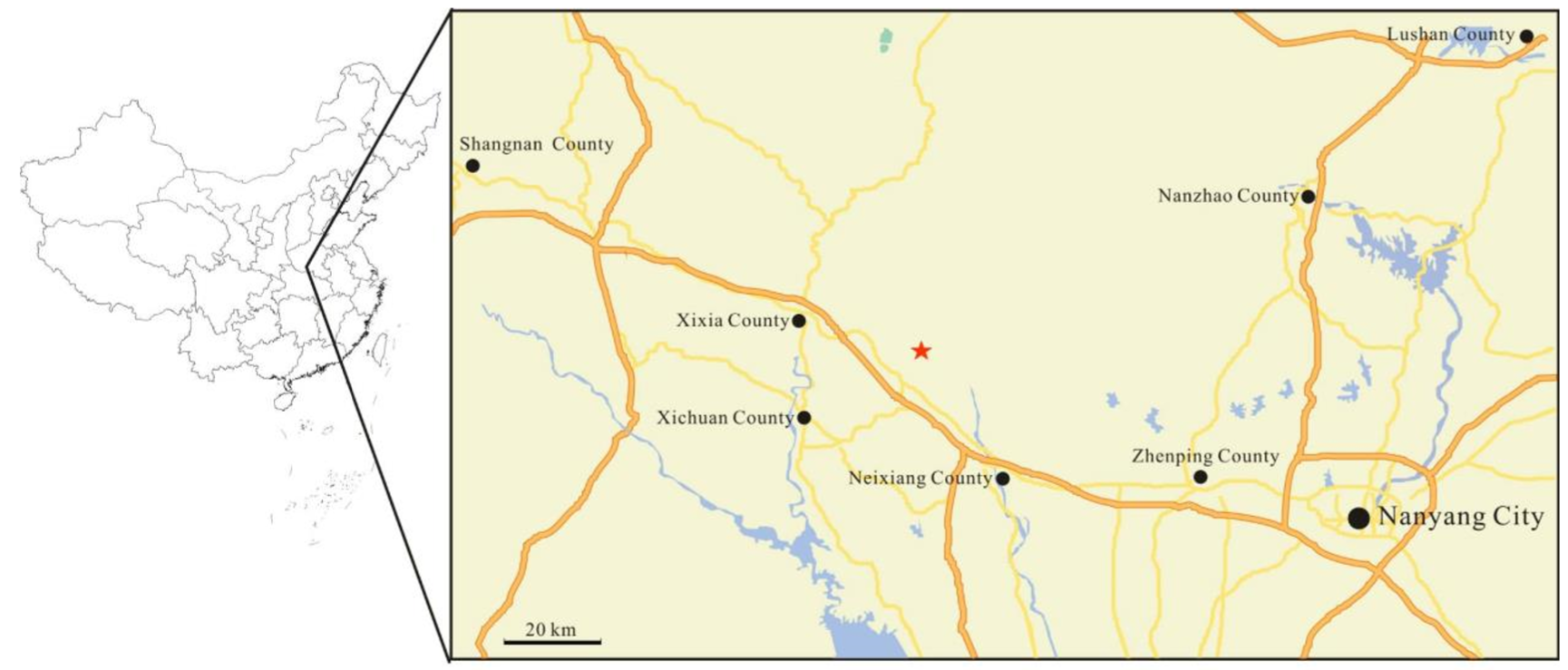
Map locality of HGM 41HIII1219, red star represents the discovery site

During the late 1980s and early 1990s, Chinese farmers excavated and collected a large amount of fossilized dinosaur eggs from Cretaceous strata of the Gaogou Formation in Henan Province, China, many of which were directly embbeded in sediments (in situ). Although Chinese authorities tried to regulate the export and illegal sales of newly discovered dinosaur eggs during the early 1990s, many ended up outside the country where they were displayed at rock and gem shows, markets, and stores, instead of being used for paleontological research. While they were kept abroad, many of the blocks containing dinosaur eggs were prepared (cleaned), revealing well preserved embryos in some cases. Among these, a partial specimen block containing a 38 cm (15 in) long embryonic oviraptorosaur skeleton with several large eggs—discovered between December 1992 and early 1993 by farmer Zhang Fengchen—became well-known to the public and scientific communities.

In 1993, that block was imported into the United States by The Stone Company, which was responsible for its preparation. In 1996, the specimen was featured on the cover of National Geographic Magazine, which nicknamed the embryonic skeleton Baby Louie in honor of its photographer, Louis Psihoyos. In 2001, the specimen was acquired by the Indianapolis Children's Museum, where it was publicly exhibited for about 12 years until a repatriation agreement was finalized in 2013. In December 2013, the specimen was repatriated to China, where as of May 2017 it was housed at the Henan Geological Museum.

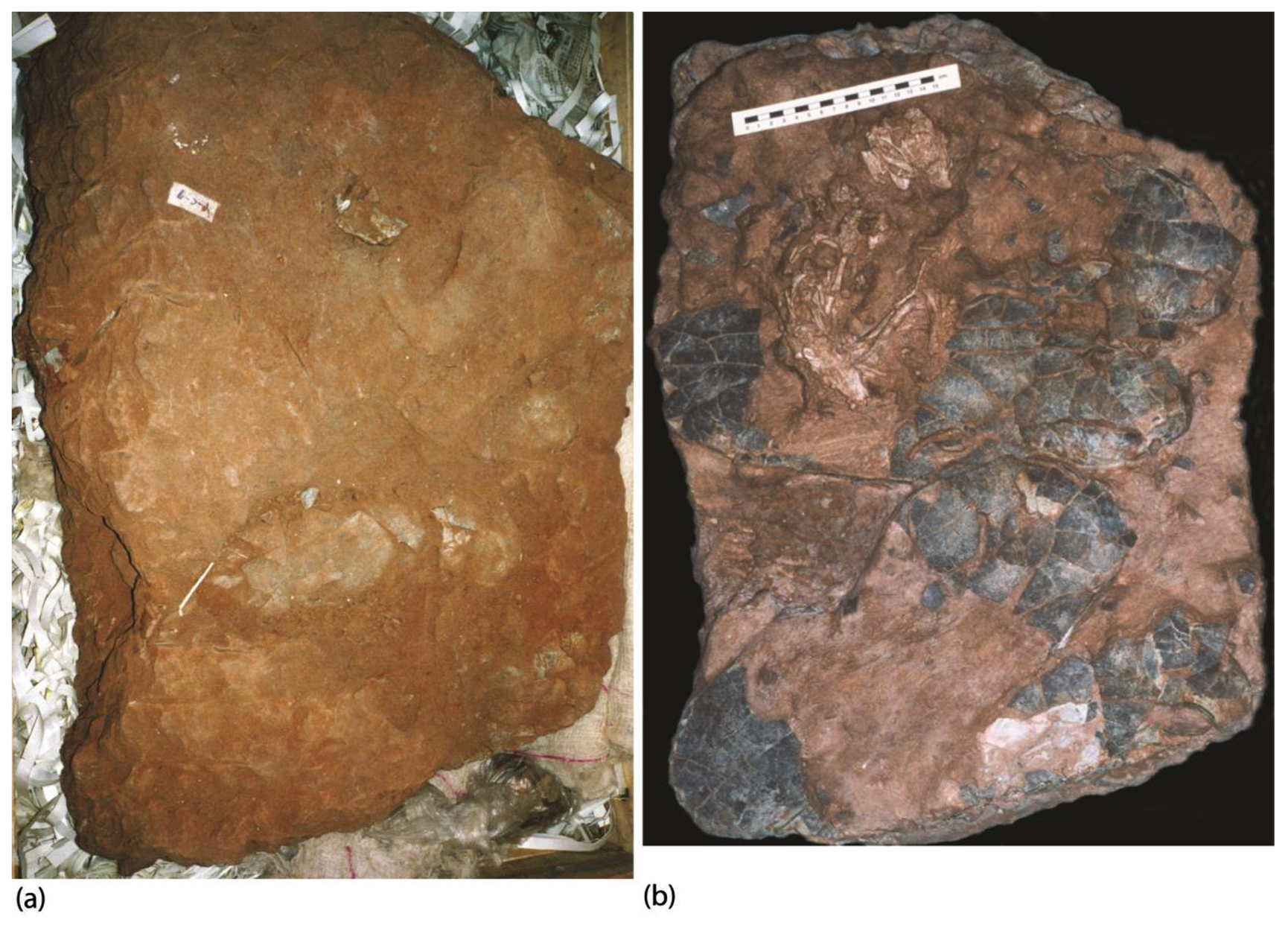
Unprepared (left) and prepared (right) block of HGM 41HIII1219

In 2015, paleontologists Hanyong Pu, Philip J. Currie, Junchang Lü, Eva B. Koppelhus, and Songhai Jia traveled to the site where Zhang Fengchen purportedly discovered the specimen and found eggshell fragments identical to those observed on the eggs associated with Baby Louie, confirming that Baby Louie was excavated in the Heimaogou locality (Xixia County) in outcrops assigned to the Late Cretaceous Gaogou Formation (Xixia Basin).

In 2017, the entire specimen was formally described by Pu and colleagues, naming the new genus and species Beibeilong sinensis. Baby Louie was assigned the specimen number HGM 41HIII1219 and designated as the holotype specimen of the species. The specimen consists of a partial semi-articulated embryonic oviraptorosaur skeleton on top of an associated partial nest of 6–8 Macroelongatoolithus eggs. Pu and colleagues noted that the preserved eggs represent only a small area of what would have been the original nest. The generic name, Beibeilong, is derived from the pinyin transliteration for the Chinese 贝贝 (bèibei) and the word 龙 (lóng), meaning "baby dragon". The specific name, sinensis, refers to its country of discovery, China (prefix Sino). The team also reported that remains attributed to a second embryo were found protruding from inside one of the eggs.

== Description ==
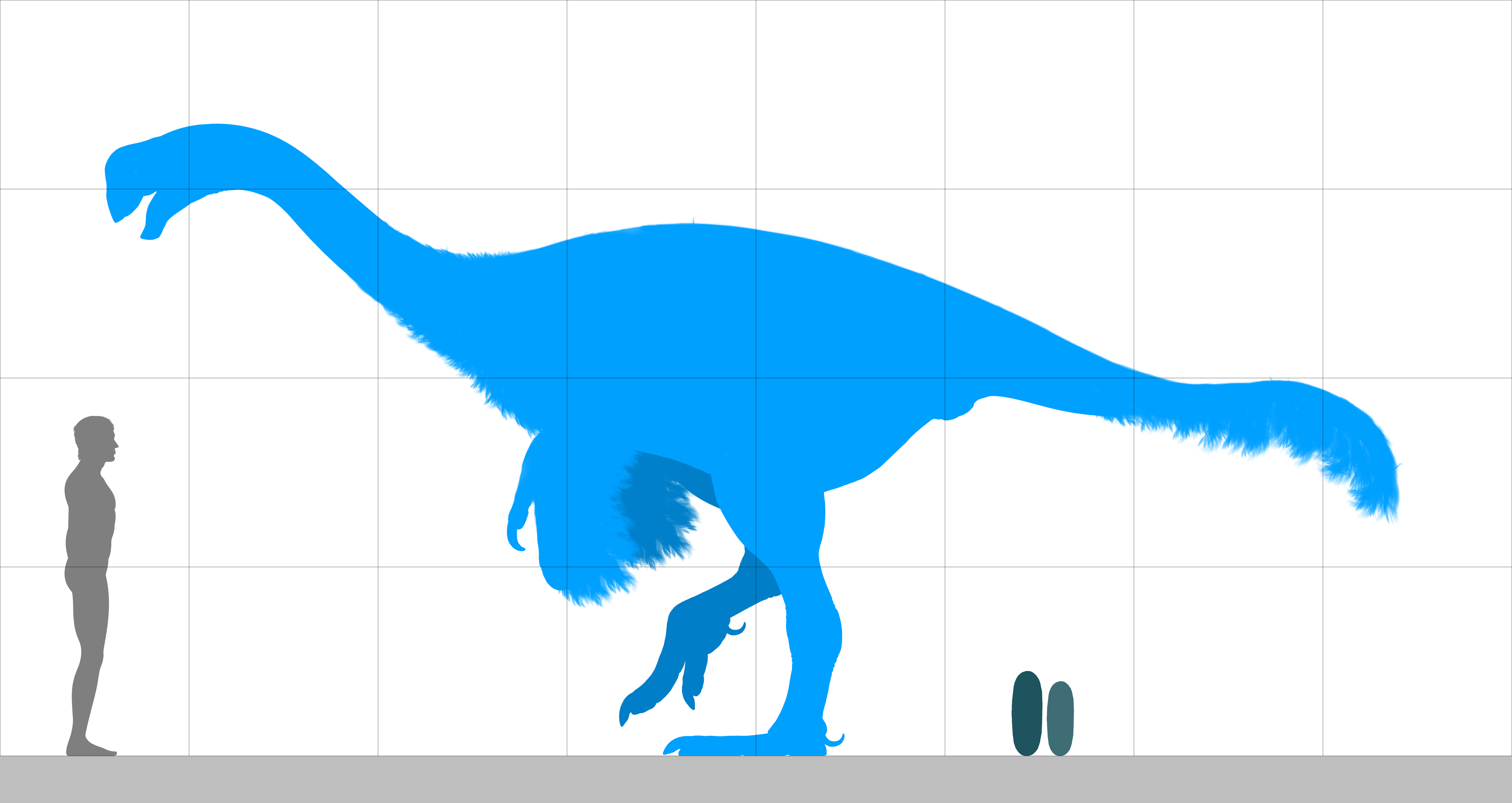
Beibeilong estimated adult size and eggs compared to a 1.8 m (5.9 ft) tall human

Beibeilong was one of the largest oviraptorosaurs. Its body size has been extrapolated from the large Macroelongatoolithus eggs associated with the holotype embryo. It had an estimated adult length of about 7.5 m (25 ft), with a body mass around 1.5–2 metric tons (1.7–2.2 short tons). The dimensions of Beibeilong were only surpassed or approached by the closely related Gigantoraptor.

Like other caenagnathids, Beibeilong would have been bipedal with well-developed legs. The head would have been small with a rhamphotheca (horny beak) at the tip of the jaws, supported by a long neck. The hands would have developed long fingers that bore large curved unguals (claw bones). The trunk would have ended in a moderate-sized tail. It is well-known that many oviraptorosaur species had feathers, including caenagnathids such as Apatoraptor. As for gigantic oviraptorosaurs (like Gigantoraptor), it has been suggested that some of this integument was reduced due to their body dimensions.

=== Skull ===
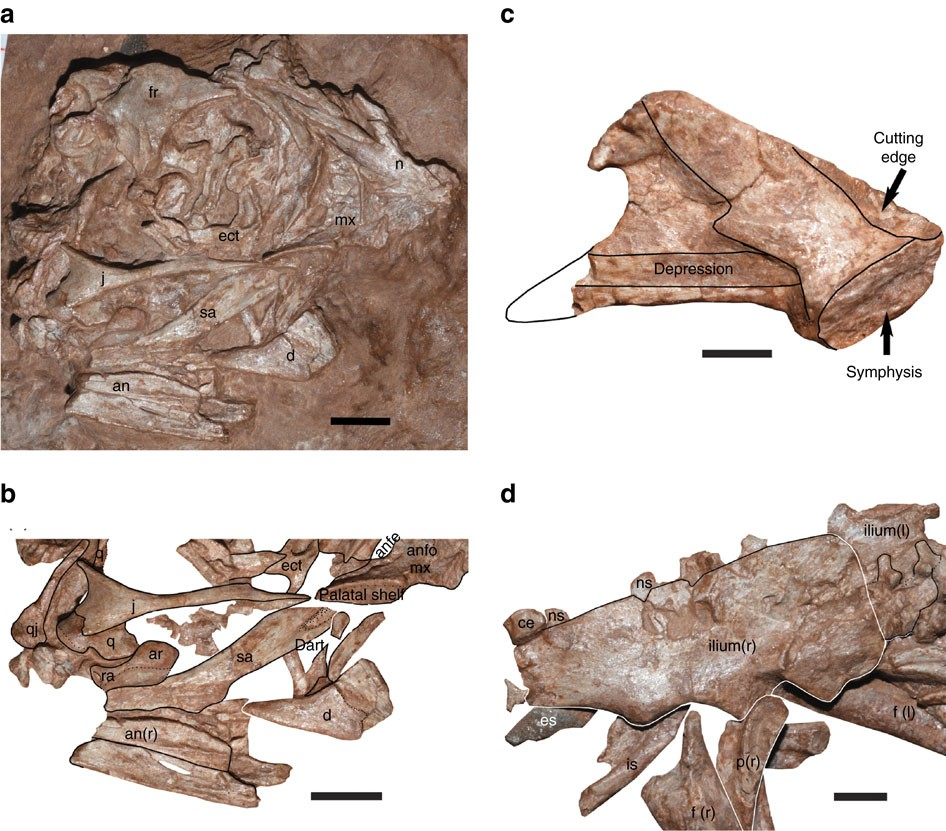
Skull (a, b, c) and pelvic girdle (d) details of embryonic Beibeilong

The skull of Beibeilong, like most caenagnathids, was edentulous (toothless) as it lacked alveoli (tooth sockets). The premaxilla (front bone of the upper jaw) had a rugose texture, likely developing a rhamphotheca. The maxilla (bone following the premaxilla) was rather short and low, giving form to the antorbital fenestra (hole in the skull behind the nostril opening), and had a pronounced antorbital fossa (depression), which was strongly demarcated by two long ridge-like structures on the external surface of the maxilla, a trait unique to Beibeilong. The nasal bones of Beibeilong were coossified together (bone fusion), and were major bones contributing to the naris (nostril) openings. The nasals also had several nutrient foramina (blood vessel attachments) on their external surface. The lacrimal (straight bone in front of the orbit) had an open-crescentic shape contributing to the anterior border of the orbit (eye socket).

A small depression on the top border of the posterior process (bony projection pointing backwards) of the lacrimal allowed the frontal bone to overlap, which was unique to Beibeilong. The frontal was a rather domed bone and formed the upper border of the orbit as well as part of the skull roof. The jugal ("cheek" bone) was a long and rather thin bone making contact with the maxilla and lacrimal, as in most oviraptorosaurs, and gave shape to the lower border of the orbit. The postorbital (small bony bar below the frontal), the last bone involved in forming the orbit, was a short, slender, and curved element that extended between the anterior end of the frontal and top process of the jugal. The quadratojugal was a tall and nearly triangular bone that was joined by the jugal. Behind the quadratojugal was the quadrate, a squared bone of great importance for the motion of the lower jaw.

The dentary (front bone of the lower jaw) of Beibeilong was relatively short and deep with proportions similar to that of other caenagnathids (such as Gigantoraptor or Microvenator), and had an overall plate/shovel-like tip with a downturned sharp edge. The posterior end of the dentary formed the external mandibular fenestra (circular hole in the lower jaw). The surangular (bone that joined the dentary at its upper edge) had a fairly curved top border and formed a relatively low coronoid process (bony projection that extended upwards from the upper border of the surangular). It was connected to the top border of the dentary through an articular depression. The articular (bone located just below the surangular) developed a convex crest-like articulation for the quadrate, which is mostly common in the distantly related oviraptorids. Distinctively, the articular bone of Beibeilong extended backwards into a retroarticular process that had a characteristic concave posterior facet.

=== Postcranial skeleton ===
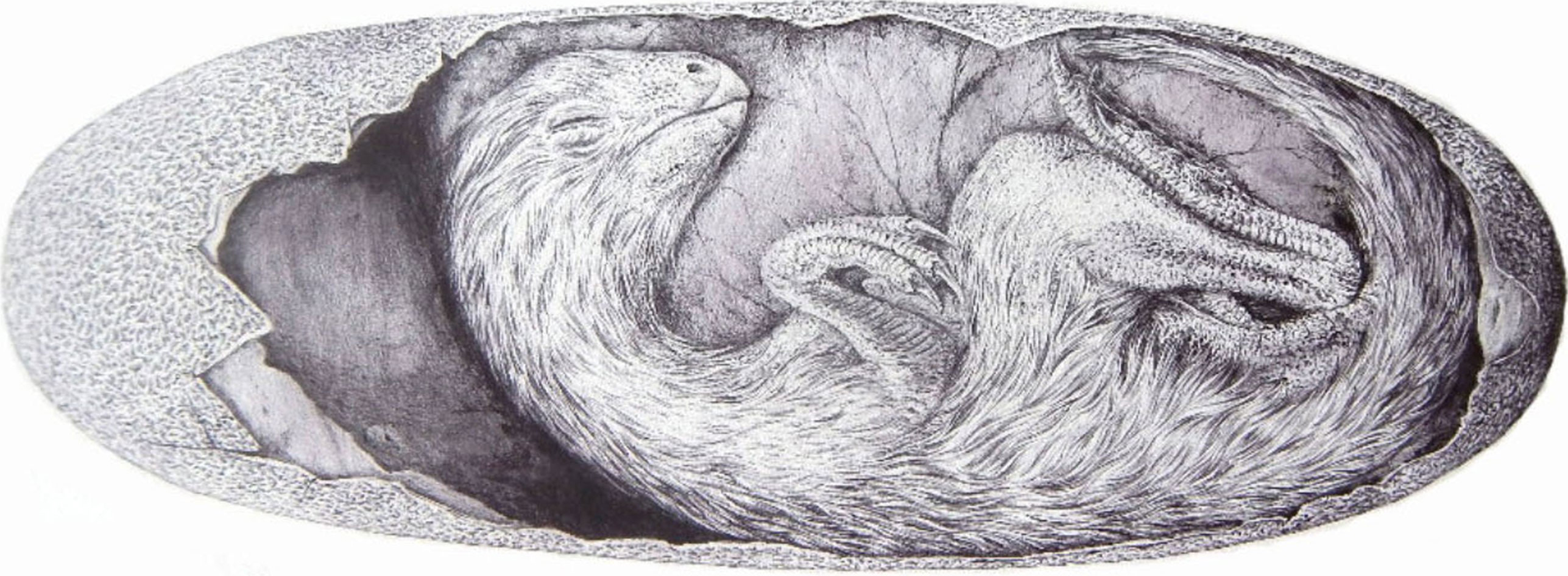
Life restoration of embryonic Beibeilong, based on Baby Louie

The centra (vertebral main body) of some cervical vertebrae (neck vertebrae) had large pleurocoels (air-filled hollow depressions) on their sides. The cervical neural arches (upper, and pointy vertebral region) of Beibeilong had low neural spines (bony spines developing upward from the top surface of the neural arch) and were X-shaped in top view. The sacrum (hip vertebrae fused into a compact structure) of Beibeilong was formed by six sacral vertebrae. The scapula was strap-like and co-joined by the furcula.

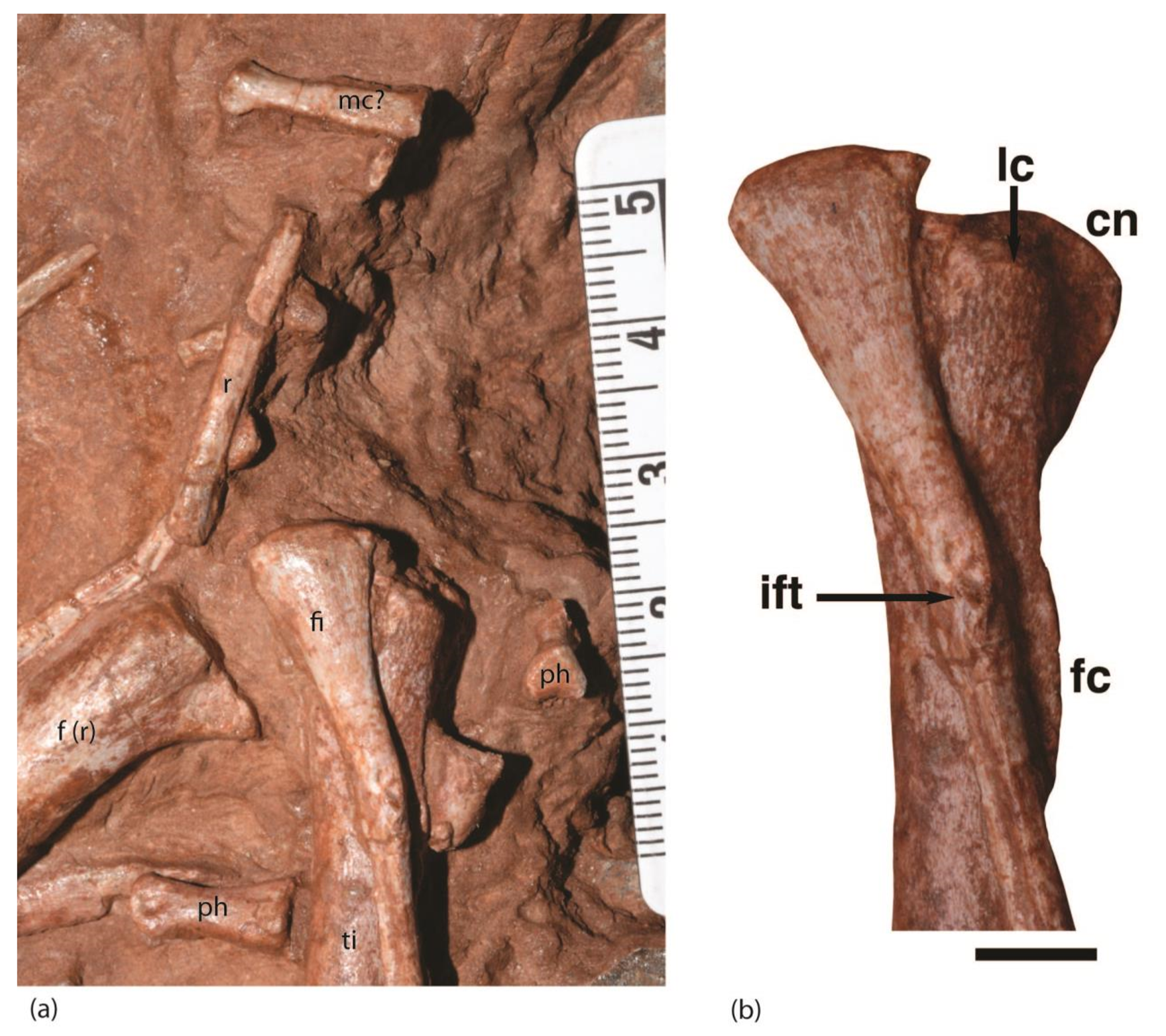
Hindlimb details of embryonic Beibeilong

The ilium was a large pelvic bone with a gently convex top border, and its preacetabular process (a recurved anterior ilium expansion, also known as "ala") was longer than the squared off postacetabular process/blade (posterior ilium expansion), another distinct feature of Beibeilong. The acetabulum (hole in the pelvic girdle formed by the ilium, ischium, and pubis) had its top border formed by the ilium with a broad gentle arch. Both the ilium and pubis were united by the pubic peduncle (lower ilium protuberance). The shaft of the ischium was a relatively skinny and rod-like shaft.

The femur (thigh bone) was robust compared to other bones, somewhat bowed, elongated, and slightly larger than the pubis. Unlike most oviraptorosaurs, Beibeilong femora lacked a ridge-like feature extending along the shaft between the lesser trochanter and the lower mid-condyle (rounded region for articulation). Furthermore, the accessory trochanter of the femur was poorly developed, a unique trait of Beibeilong. The tibia (shinbone) lacked the distinctive boss that is present on the lower end of the cnemial crest in most oviraptorosaurs. Both the fibular crest and its condyle were connected to each other, low, and poorly defined.

=== Eggs ===
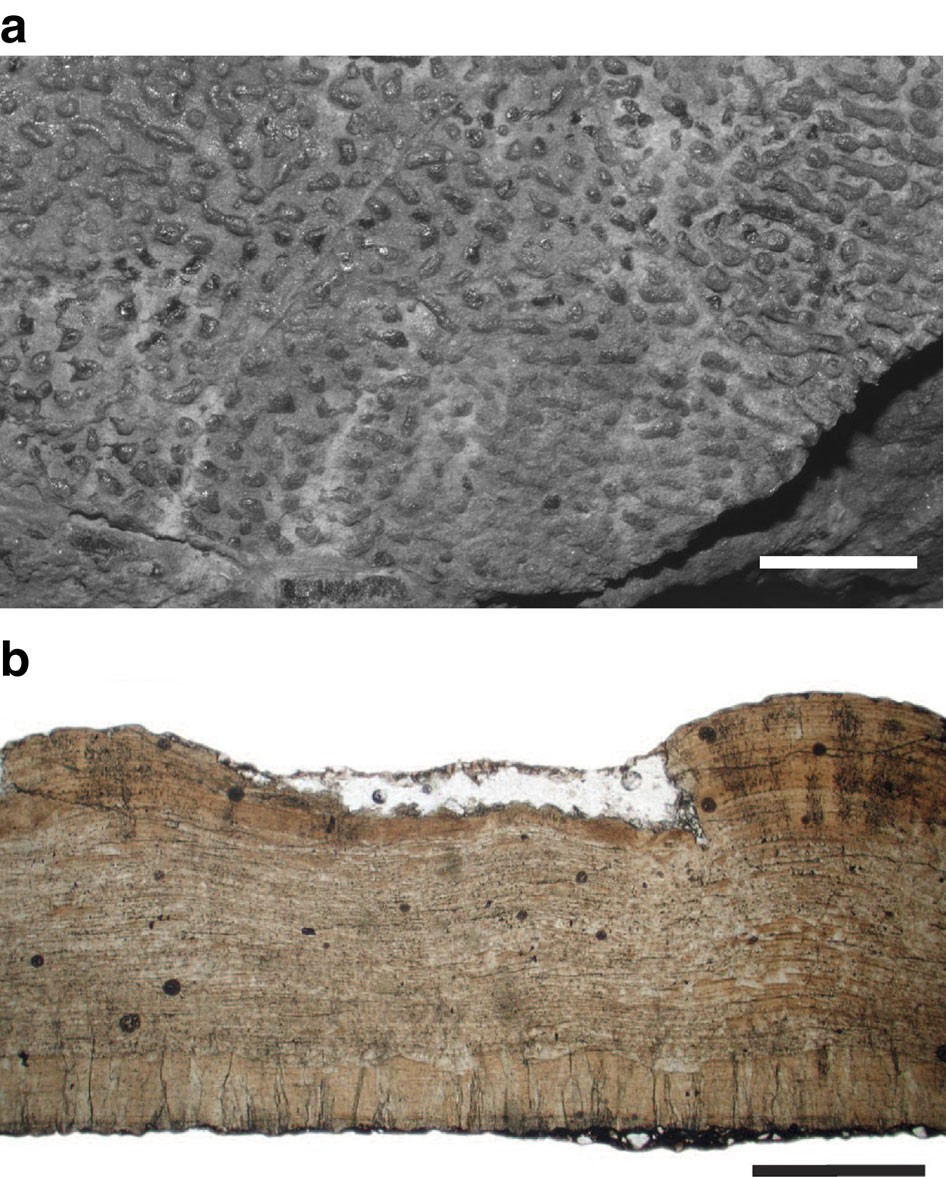
Eggshell surface (a) and microstructure (b) of a Beibeilong egg

The eggs of Beibeilong belong to the oospecies Macroelongatoolithus xixiaensis—the largest known type of dinosaur eggs—and, specifically, to giant caenagnathids. They were very elongated with rather rounded poles or ends, and measured between 40–45 cm (16–18 in) in length. In its microscopic composition, the eggshell was a two-layered structure with an outer continuous layer (non-interrupted orientation of the microstructure) and an inner mammillary/cone layer (rounded and interrupted orientation of the microstructure). Although not considered a layer, the boundary separating both the outer and inner layers was demarcated, undulatory, and wavy. Total eggshell thickness varied from 1.7 mm (0.17 cm) to 2.56 mm (0.256 cm).

The eggshell of Beibeilong eggs was ornamented on its external surface, characterized by a rugose texture composed of nodes that were both scattered and that formed ridge-like and irregular chain-like structures. Like other Macroelongatoolithus nests, a complete Beibeilong nest would have been ring-shaped with a center devoid of eggs.

== Classification ==
In 2017, Pu and team considered Beibeilong to have been anatomically similar to, but more basal (primitive) than Gigantoraptor. This conclusion was consistently recovered in their phylogenetic analyses incorporating ontogenetically (growth) variable characteristics. Beibeilong was recovered within the oviraptorosaur family Caenagnathidae in a relatively basal position. Members of this family are distinguished from other oviraptorosaurs in their skeletal proportions, most notably in their skull anatomy. For instance, members of Oviraptoridae have deep and robust jaws, highly positioned nasal cavities, as well as different hand morphologies (such as the Heyuanninae subfamily). Caenagnathids, on the other hand, have more elongated, pointy, and flat skulls with low nasal cavities, and in turn their manual ungual anatomy is rather generic/simple. Despite their differences, it is known that both groups convergently developed cranial crests.

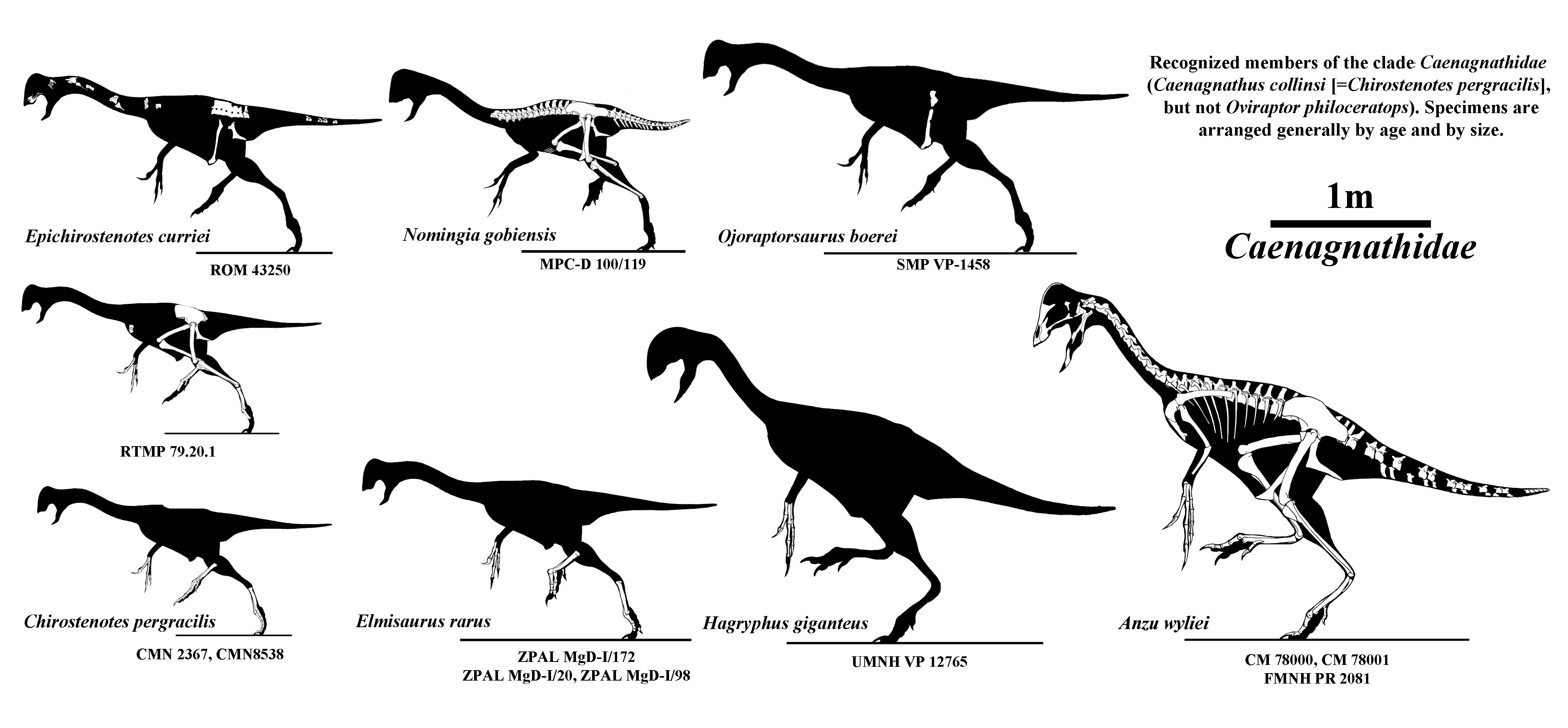
Skeletal diagrams featuring several members of Caenagnathidae

Below is the obtained cladogram by Pu and team in 2017:

- Caenagnathidae
  - Microvenator celer
  - unnamed
    - Beibeilong sinensis
    - unnamed
      - Gigantoraptor erlianensis
      - unnamed
        - Epichirostenotes curriei
        - Anzu wyliei
        - Hagryphus giganteus
        - Chirostenotes pergracilis
        - Apatoraptor pennatus
        - Elmisaurus rarus
        - Leptorhynchos elegans
        - Caenagnathus collinsi
        - Caenagnathasia martinsoni

== Paleobiology ==
=== Ontogeny ===
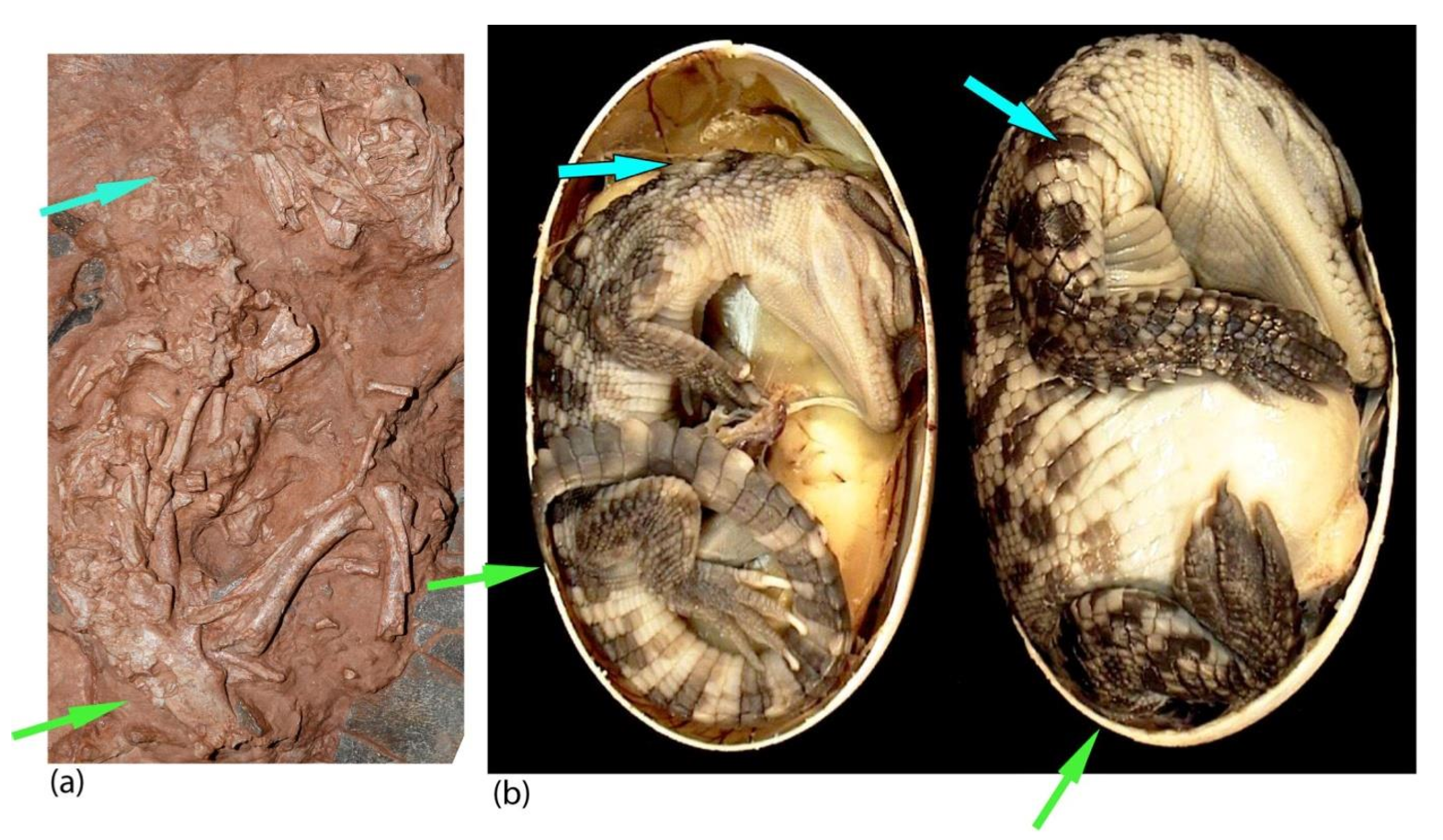
Embryonic stage of Beibeilong compared to siamese crocodile embryos

In their 2017 description of Beibeilong, Pu and team compared embryonic Baby Louie to Gigantoraptor, which together represent informative stages in the ontogeny (growth) of giant caenagnathids. Elements like the dentary probably fused together at their symphysis (i.e., left and right sides cartilaginously fused together at their union) after hatching and retained a consistent size relative to other skull elements during the growth of the individual. Although both genera feature different mandible-to-femur length ratios (approximately 0.87 in Beibeilong vs. 0.45 in Gigantoraptor), indicating differences in relative skull sizes, it is most likely that these result from their respective growth stages.

Shuo Wang and colleagues have concluded that caenagnathids experienced a dietary shift as they aged, based on several features in the dentaries (lateral occlusal grooves and ridges on the occlusal surfaces, interpreted as vestigial tooth sockets). According to the team, juvenile caenagnathids had teeth that were progressively lost during growth. Noting that the perinate Baby Louie specimen of Beibeilong lacks some of these features in the dentary, despite its young age, Wang and team have suggested three scenarios to explain the lack of vestigial alveoli in Beibeilong: (1) that this taxon may have been strictly edentulous; (2) that teeth were indeed present in Beibeilong but were lost before eruption of the null generation of teeth; or (3) that teeth erupted later and were lost at a much higher rate in Beibeilong than other caenagnathids. Thus, the team concluded that vestigial tooth structures should be preserved in more mature specimens.

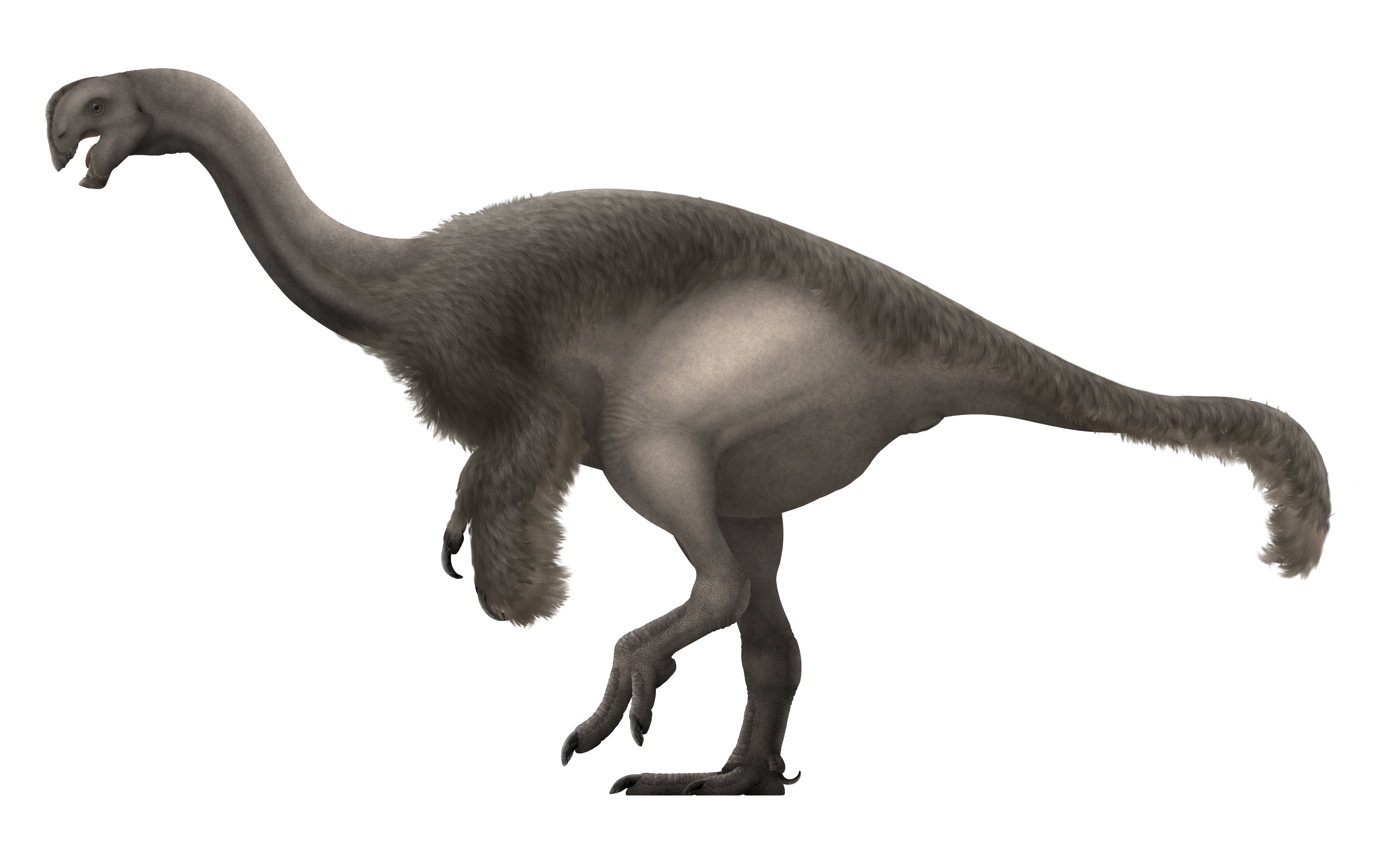
Speculative life restoration of adult Beibeilong based on other caenagnathids

Gregory F. Funston and colleagues have rejected Wang and colleagues' hypothesis. They have argued that the phylogeny of Caenagnathidae, along with other primitive oviraptorosaurs such as Avimimus, implies that simple dentaries lacking complex structures (such as vestigial alveoli) are the ancestral condition of caenagnathids. They have also rejected the second scenario proposed by Wang and colleagues because it would require a slowdown in the development of the horny beak, which would in turn require caenagnathids to reacquire functional teeth from an edentulous ancestor, and that teeth would offer no adaptive benefit. Lastly, Funston and team have rejected the third scenario given that Gigantoraptor—which is similar to Beibeilong, and represents a very mature giant caenagnathid—lacks any occlusal ridges or grooves, hence disproving the hypothesis that Beibeilong and other caenagnathids had teeth and lost them during ontogeny.

=== Reproduction ===
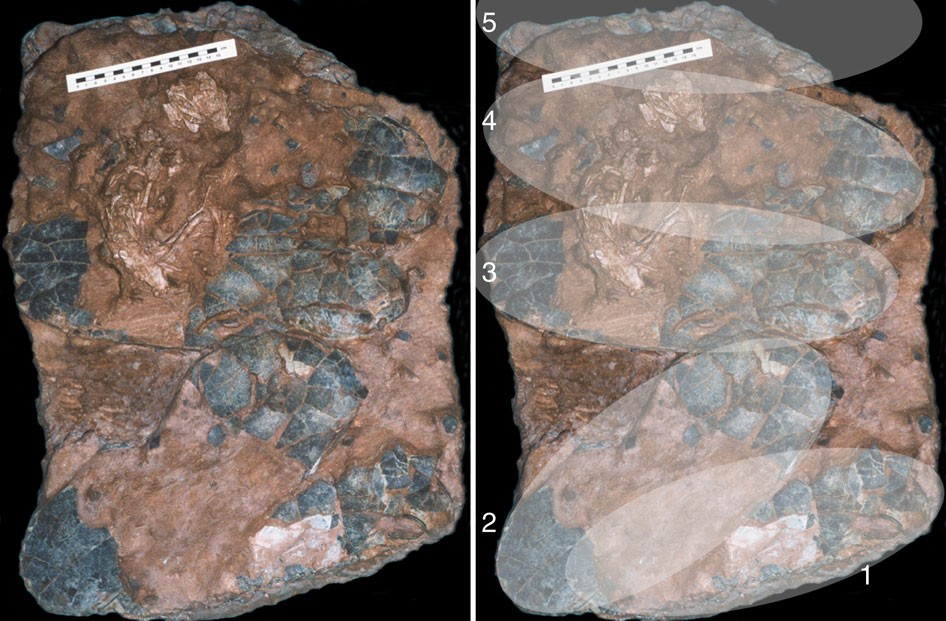
Beibeilong holotype egg block, showing number of preserved Macroelongatoolithus eggs

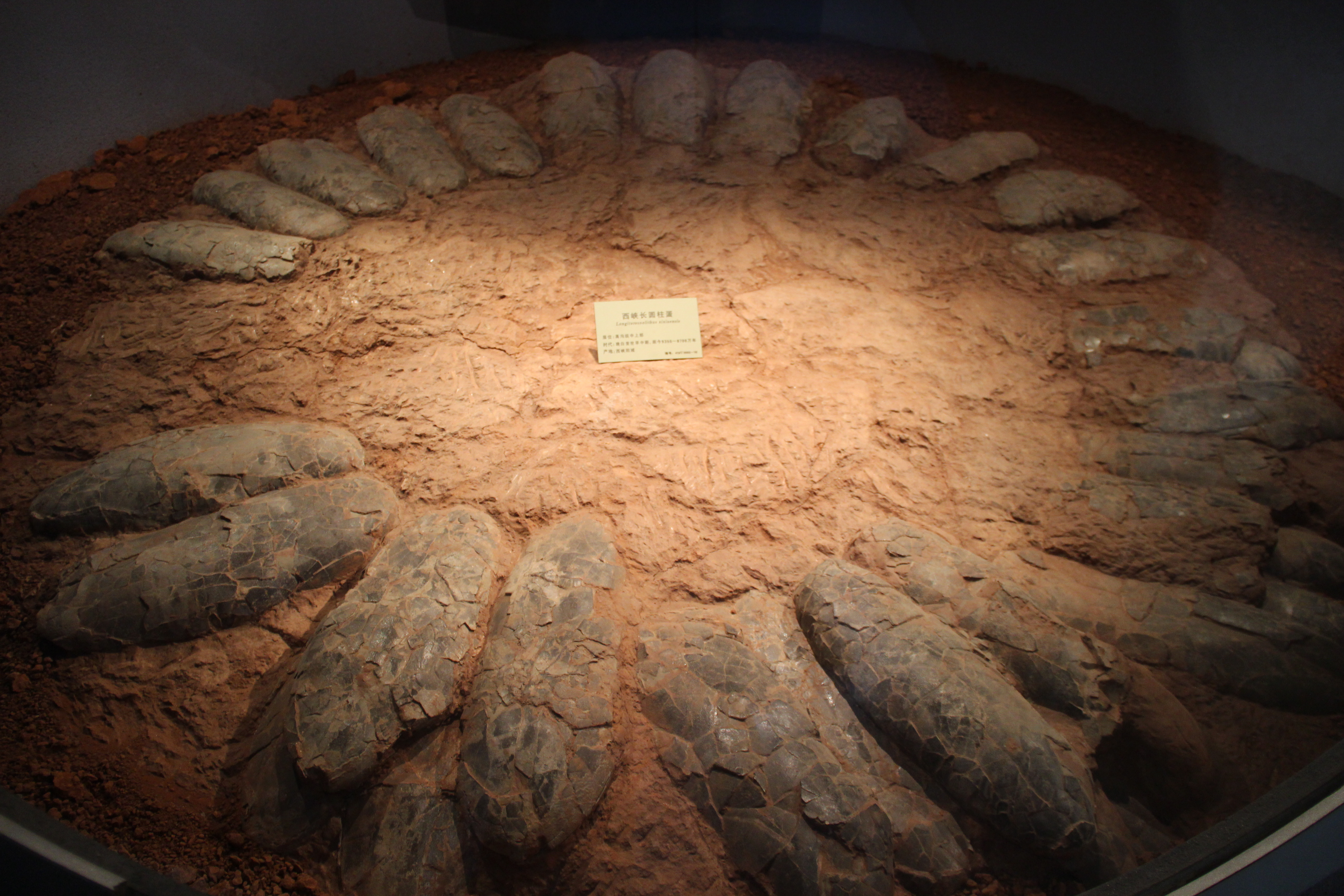
Nearly complete Macroelongatoolithus nest (specimen 41HV003-16), showing the complete structure of such nests

Based on comparisons with other Macroelongatoolithus egg clutches, Pu and team have noted that the arrangement and size of the eggs associated with Baby Louie indicates that the original nest would have been large and ring-shaped with a center devoid of eggs. The nest of Beibeilong was composed of two layers of eggs, despite most other Macroelongatoolithus nests preserving only a single layer of eggs. When attending the nest, the adult would have sat in the center of the clutch, as has been proposed for smaller oviraptorids. Most notably, the team has suggested that the entire Beibeilong nest receoved with Baby Louie was likely in an advanced stage of incubation when it was buried given that perinate skeletal remains were found in association with 2–3 eggs in the block specimen. They also have noted that Macroelontaoolithus (including eggs associated with Beibeilong) and other elongatoolithid eggs and nests are similarly arranged in clutch configuration and overall morphology, as well as eggshell texture and histology. These traits indicate that both caenagnathids and oviraptorids probably had fairly comparable nesting behaviours, but also that these features are ancestral for at least the whole Caenagnathoidea (superfamily containing both Caenagnathidae and Oviraptoridae).

Kohei Tanaka and team have examined several egg clutches of numerous oviraptorosaur specimens, including egg clutches assigned to Macroelongatoolithus, in order to evaluate how the nest configuration correlates to the body size in oviraptorosaur incubation behavior. Eggshell porosity reflects that eggs of almost all oviraptorosaurs were exposed in the nest without an external covering, such as a substrate. Though most oviraptorosaur nests have eggs arranged in a circular fashion, the morphology of the nest differs in smaller and larger species. Small-bodied oviraptorosaurs (such as oviraptorids with small Elongatoolithus eggs) arranged their nests in a tightened ring-like fashion packed with eggs and a rather small nest center devoid of eggs. Similarly, large-bodied oviraptorosaurs (like Beibeilong or Gigantoraptor with large Macroelongatoolithus eggs) built their nests with a ring-like architectur; however, such nests were not over-packed with eggs and the center was proportionally much larger. These nest strategies indicate that whereas small-sized oviraptorosaurs sat directly on the eggs, gigantic oviraptorosaurs, such as Beibeilong or Gigantoraptor, likely sat on the central area devoid of eggs. Tanaka and colleagues have stated that this adaptation would have been beneficial in avoiding egg-crushing because of the body dimensions of nesting adults, and also could have allowed some body contact during incubation in giant oviraptorosaurs.

Although associations of nest-adult oviraptorosaurs (a product of catastrophic live burial events) are generally considered as indicating direct brooding contact incubation, differences in egg numbers and orientation, as well as their overall architecture, suggests that most adult oviraptorosaurs were not necessarily incubating the nest; Tzu-Ruei Yang and colleagues have suggested that these nest-adult associations may represent female oviraptorosaurs in—or after—the process of oviposition (laying of eggs), or alternatively that female oviraptorosaurs guarded their nests.

== Paleoenvironment ==
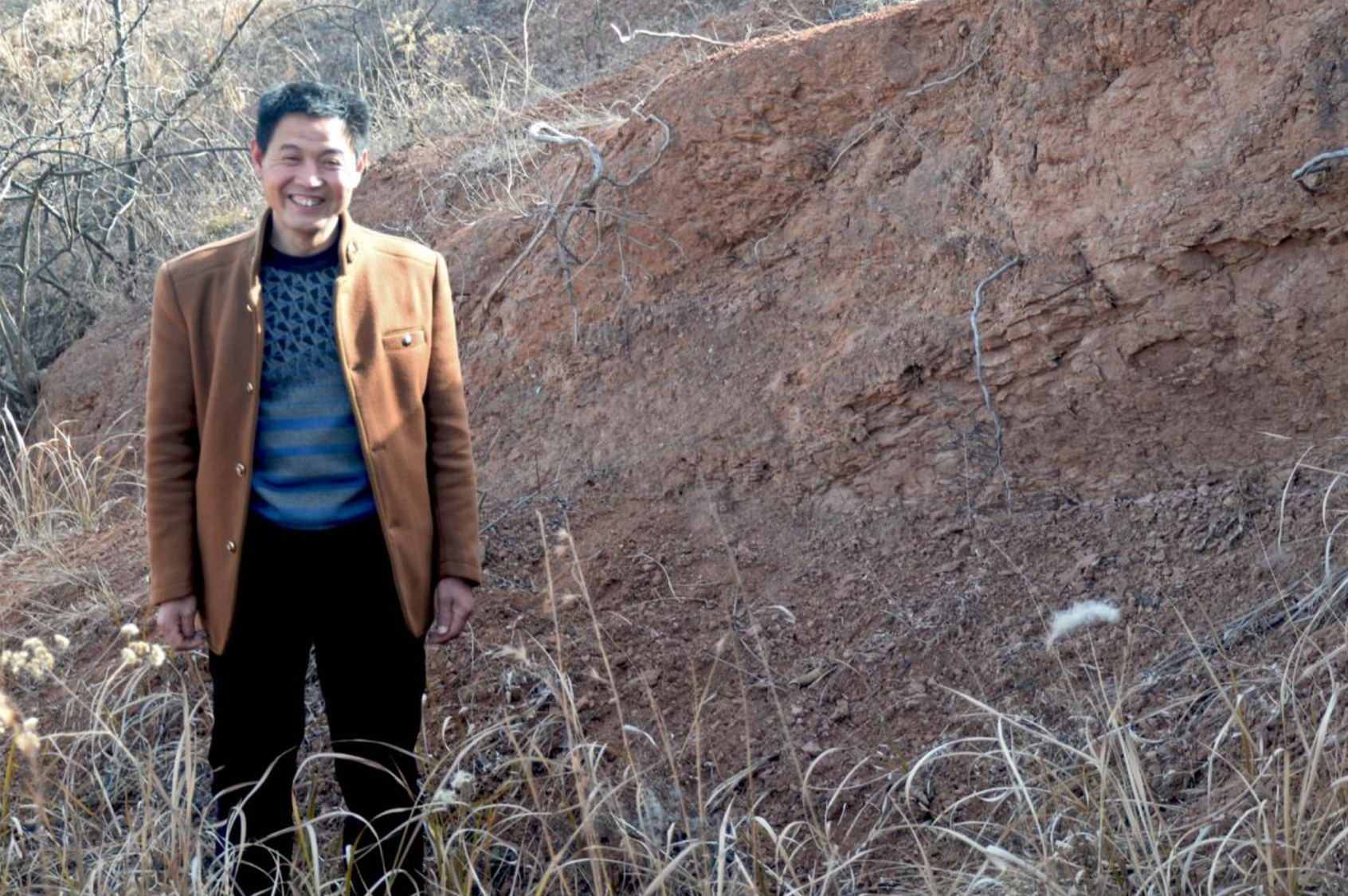
Zhang Fengchen, one of the discoverers, at the excavation locality of embryonic Baby Louie

Beibeilong was discovered in the Gaogou Formation, which dates back to the Late Cretaceous epoch, c. 96 million years – c. 88 million years ago (Cenomanian–Coniacian ages). This unit is separated into three members: an upper member characterized by alluvial fan sediments (an accumulation of sediments in the form of a flattened "fan"); and the middle and lower members composed of terrigenous clastic rocks of alluvial origin and fluvial sedimentation left by braided rivers. The overall sedimentology across the Gaogou Formation, made up bofy floodplain and lacustrine conglomerates, sandstones, and mudstones, indicates a dry subtropical or tropical climate during deposition. The geological horizon in which Baby Louie was found is interpreted as a flat and wide alluvial fan.

The δ^{13}C levels of several eggshells from geological formations of the Xixia Basin (including the Gaogou Formation) suggest that herbivorous dinosaurs fed mainly on C3 and C4 plants with proportions of 61% and 39%, respectively. The higher ratio of C3 over C4 plants indicates sub-humid or sub-arid climate settings. In addition, numerous scattered amber remains of conifer origin from Gaogou indicate that Araucariaceae were largely present in the Northern Hemisphere of Asia during the Late Cretaceous, including the paleoenvironments in which Beibeilong lived. The repeated presence of giant caenagnathids (such as the Bayan Shireh caenagnathid or Gigantoraptor) in fluvial-based sedimentation of geological formations suggests that these large oviraptorosaurs preferred mesic (well-watered) over xeric (desertic) habitats.

Geological evidence from volcanic rocks of the Xionger Mountain found at Zhaoying Village (where outcrops of the Gaogou Formation are present) indicates that the Gaogou paleoecosystem underwent hostile climate changes, characterized by a drying tendency. Changes in the humidity and precipitation levels negatively altered the paleoflora as well as both river and floodplain paleoenvironments, forcing herbivorous organisms to migrate between the foot of the mountain and flood plains. When the precipitation levels rose, the water bodies and floodplains became repopulated. In addition, carbonate carbon/oxygen isotope analyses indicate that extended periods of climatic changes ultimately deteriorated the Gaogou Formation paleoecosystem as a whole, triggering the loss of foliage cover and the extinction of the local herbivorous dinosaurs. Many of the fossilized eggs across this formation were possibly unable to hatch due to the paleoenvironmental conditions.

The Gaogou Formation is extremely abundant in fossilized eggs, mostly of dinosaurs and turtles. Other remains include multiple invertebrate taxa comprising fresh water non-marine bivalves, gastropods, ostracods, and abundant insect ichnotaxa (fossilized traces left by insect activity). Additional vertebrates found in this unit include the sauropod Baotianmansaurus, and the nanhsiungchelyid turtle Yuchelys.

=== Taphonomy ===
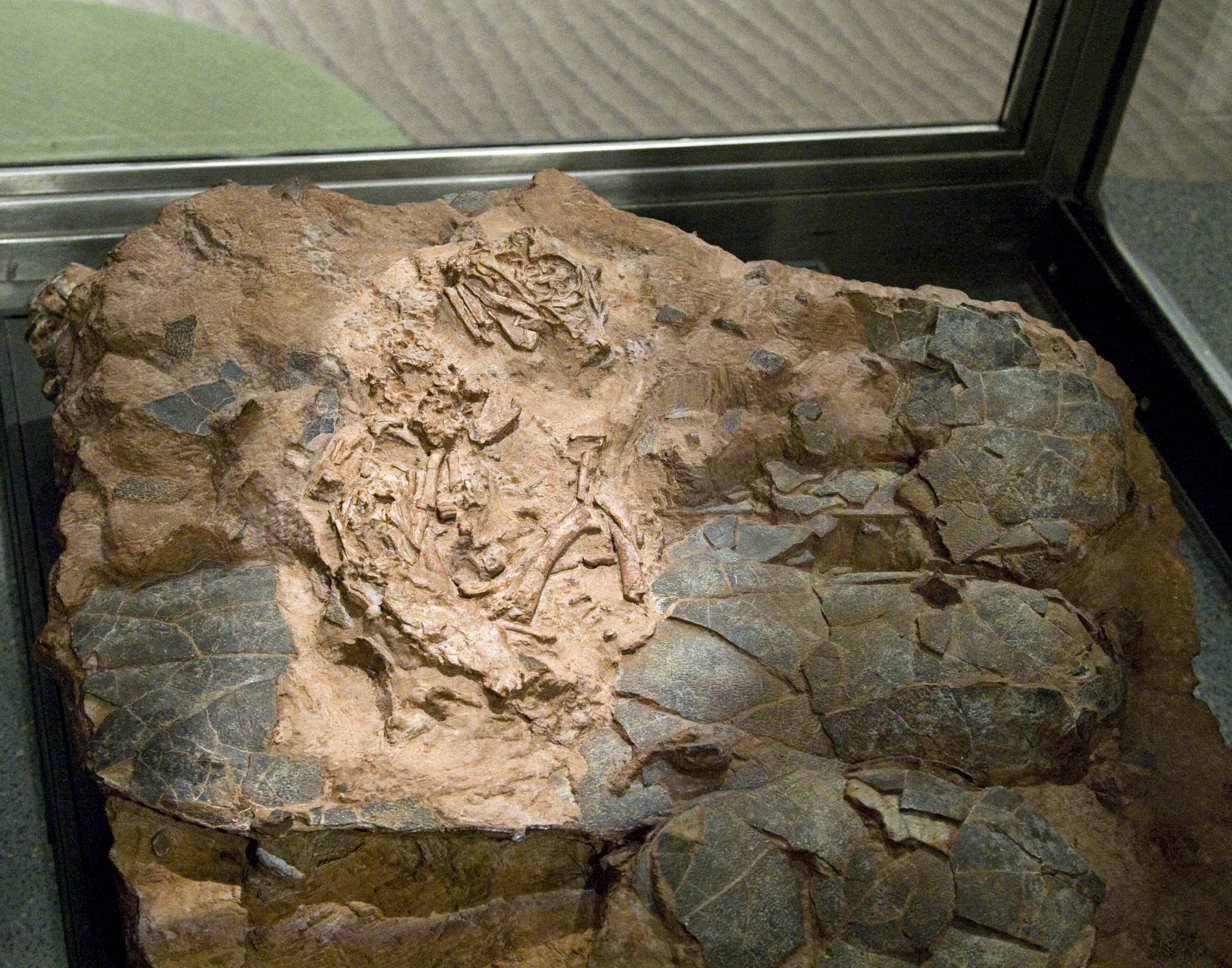
Baby Louie lying on top of crushed eggs, Children's Museum of Indianapolis

The preservation state of Baby Louie indicates that the embryo was lying outside its parent egg when it was buried. Its orientation, which is inconsistent with that of the eggs, suggests that an external force pushed it from its underlying egg to the eggs at the top. Elements like the skull have been damaged due to scavenging and erosion. For instance, the entire skull has collapsed into a horizontal layer, where bones from the right side are best visible, and the premaxillae and dentary tips were partially destroyed after the individual died. There are indications of postmortem scavenging damage left by either osteophagous or boring insects in bones, including the lower portion of the right leg, the ilium, and the upper end of the femur. In addition, numerous borings and other elongated burrows left by those organisms are found across Baby Louie. Most skeletal elements are disarticulated, such as the left dentary, overall neck, abdominal region, and limb elements. While not visible, it is suggested that the tail could lie underneath the rest of the body or matrix, or alternatively, that it was ripped off by scavenging predators.

== See also ==
- Timeline of oviraptorosaur research
