= Nipponoolithus =

Nipponoolithus Temporal range: Albian

Egg fossil classification
- Oofamily: incertae sedis
- Oogenus: †Nipponoolithus; Tanaka et al. 2016

Oospecies
- †N. ramosus Tanaka et al. (2016) (type)

Dinosaur egg

Nipponoolithus is an oogenus of fossil egg native to Japan. It is one of the smallest known dinosaur eggs, and was probably laid by some kind of non-avian maniraptoran theropod.

== Distribution ==
Nipponoolithus remains are known from the Lower Cretaceous Ohyamashimo Formation in Kamitaki, southeastern Tamba, Hyogo, Japan. The site is dated to the lower Albian.

== History ==
Though fossil dinosaur skeletons are rare in Japan, they have been well-documented since 1978. The first Japanese fossil eggs were discovered in 2003: Yoichi Azuma documented numerous eggs of the Ratite morphotype in the Kitadani Formation, and Ren Hirayama et al. documented dinosaur and turtle eggshells in the Kuwajima Formation. However, these eggs were never described in detail. In 2006, the dinosaur-rich Kamitaki locality in the Ohyamashimo Formation was discovered. In 2016, a team of paleontologists from Japan and Canada collected numerous fossilized eggs at Kamitaki, including the specimens which they would refer to a new oogenus and oospecies: Nipponoolithus ramosus.

== Description ==
Nipponoolithus ramosus is known only from a handful of isolated eggshell fragments ranging from 0.36 to 0.53 mm in thickness, just barely larger than a chicken egg. It is estimated, based on the eggshell thickness, that Nipponoolithus eggs weighed about 100 grams (3.5 oz), making it among the smallest fossil dinosaur eggs ever discovered.

Like most non-avian dinosaur eggs, it has two layers: the outer continuous layer, and the inner mammillary layer. The continuous layer is two to four times thicker than the mammillary layer. Nipponoolithus's outer surface is ornamented with low, branched ridges, similar to ornamentation observed in Macroelongatoolithus, Montanoolithus, Paraelongatoolithus, Reticuloolithus, Spheruprismatoolithus, and the eggs of Deinonychus. The crystals in the mammillary layer are acicular or wedge-like.

== Paleobiology ==
N. rumosus was most likely laid by some kind of non-avian maniraptor because of its similarities in microstructure and ornamentation to oviraptorosaur eggs and the eggs of Deinonychus. Other very small theropod eggs (ranging in size from 27 grams (0.95 oz) to 135 grams (4.8 oz)), including Elongatoolithus, Prismatoolithus (and other indeterminate prismatoolithids), as well as ornithopod eggs assigned to Spheroolithus, are also known from the Kamitaki site. These eggs, along with skeletal remains, show that the parents of Nipponoolithus coexisted with numerous other small theropods, as well as an assemblage of ankylosaurs, titanosaurs, hadrosauroids, tyrannosaurs, and therizinosaurs. The parent of Nipponoolithus probably weighed roughly 15 kilograms (33 lb), comparable to the size of some contemporary small theropods from the Jehol biota in China.

== Parataxonomy ==
Nipponoolithus has not been place into any described oofamily. It contains a single oospecies: N. ramosus.
