= Undulatoolithus =

Undulatoolithus Temporal range: Upper Cretaceous

Egg fossil classification
- Basic shell type: Ornithoid
- Morphotype: Ornithoid-ratite
- Oofamily: †Elongatoolithidae
- Oogenus: †Undulatoolithus; Wang et al., 2013

Oospecies
- †U. pengi Wang et al., 2013 (type)

Oogenus of dinosaur egg

Undulatoolithus is an oogenus of Late Cretaceous fossil dinosaur egg classified in Elongatoolithidae, known from China and Utah. It is very similar to Macroolithus, but has different ornamentation. Like other elongatoolithids, it was probably laid by oviraptorosaurs.

== Distribution ==
Undulatoolithus is found in the Zhoutian Formation, in the Pingxiang Basin of Jiangxi, and from the Cedar Mountain Formation in Emery County of Utah. Both formations are dated to the Upper Cretaceous.

== History ==
The Pingxiang Basin, in Jiangxi, was first excavated for fossils in 2002. Several fossil eggs, egg clutches, and dinosaur bones were discovered, including those later described as Undulatoolithus in 2013 by Chinese paleontologists Wang Qiang, Zhao Zikui, Wang Xiaolin, Li Ning, and Zou Songlin. The type specimen of Undulatoolithus, a partial nest containing several eggs, was the first elongatoolithid egg clutch discovered in the Pingxiang basin.

In 2025, the discovery of another Undulatoolithus specimen (an eggshell fragment) was reported from the Cedar Mountain Formation of Utah.

== Description ==
Like all elongatoolithids, Undulatoolithus eggs are elongated and asymmetrical, and have a two-layered eggshell (consisting of the cone layer and the columnar layer). The only known Undulatoolithus specimen is a nest consisting of five complete eggs and three partial eggs. The eggs are paired and arranged radially, similar to other elongatoolithids. They average about 20 centimetres (7.9 in) long and 8 centimetres (3.1 in) across. The eggshell is nearly 1.5 mm thick, including ornamentation.

The boundary between the two eggshell layers in Undulatoolithus is gradual. The cone layer is relatively thin, ranging from one fourth to one eighth the width of the columnar layer.

The most notable characteristic of Undulatoolithus is the ornamentation on the surface of the eggshell. Like most elongatoolithids it is covered with nodes and ridges, but they are much more prominent than other oospecies and make up nearly half the total eggshell thickness.

== Paleobiology ==
Undulatoolithus has not been associated with embryos or skeletal remains, so the identity of the egg-laying dinosaur is unknown. However, all embryos or adult skeletons that have been associated with other elongatoolithids are oviraptorids. Like other elongatoolithids, Undulatoolithus probably received intensive parental care.

== Parataxonomy ==
Undulatoolithus is classified as within Elongatoolithidae. It is very similar to Macroolithus, but has much more prominent eggshell ornamentation.
