= Heishanoolithus =

Heishanoolithus Temporal range: Early Cretaceous

Egg fossil classification
- Basic shell type: Ornithoid
- Morphotype: Ornithoid-ratite
- Oofamily: †Elongatoolithidae
- Oogenus: †Heishanoolithus; Zhao and Zhao, 1999

Oospecies
- †H. changii Zhao and Zhao 1999 (type)

Heishanoolithus is an oogenus of Elongatoolithid fossil egg from the Shahai Formation in Liaoning. It is known only from seven eggshell fragments. It is most notable for having a very thin eggshell (1.2-1.3 mm thick), the dense covering of nodes on the eggshell surface, and for its relatively thin mammilary layer (making up only one eighth of the eggshell thickness). While no remains of Heishanoolithus have been associated with skeletal remains, strong evidence links Elongatoolithid eggs to Oviraptorosaurs.
