= Porituberoolithus =

Porituberoolithus Temporal range: late Campanian ~77–83.6 Ma

Egg fossil classification
- Basic shell type: Ornithoid
- Morphotype: Ornithoid-ratite
- Oofamily: †Elongatoolithidae
- Oogenus: †Porituberoolithus; Zelenitsky, Hills & Currie, 1996

Oospecies
- † P. warnerensis

Dinosaur egg

Porituberoolithus is an oogenus of dinosaur egg found in the late Campanian Oldman Formation and Dinosaur Park Formation of Alberta, the Fossil Forest Member of the Fruitland Formation in New Mexico, the Upper Shale Member of the Aguja Formation in Texas and Cerro del Pueblo Formation (Difunta Group) of Mexico. It was originally described as distinct from the Elongatoolithids on the basis of its ornamentation, but it was listed as a member of that oofamily by Wang et al. 2010. It is very similar to Subtiliolithus, but has a thicker shell.

== See also ==
- List of dinosaur oogenera
