= Paraelongatoolithus =

Paraelongatoolithus Temporal range: Turonian

Egg fossil classification
- Basic shell type: Ornithoid
- Morphotype: Ornithoid-ratite
- Oofamily: †Elongatoolithidae
- Oogenus: †Paraelongatoolithus; Wang, Wang, Zhao & Jiang, 2010

Oospecies
- †P. reticulatus Wang, Wang, Zhao & Jiang, 2010 (type)

Oogenus of dinosaur egg

Paraelongatoolithus is a late Cretaceous oogenus of Chinese fossil egg, classified in the oofamily Elongatoolithidae, which represents the eggs of oviraptorosaurs.

== Distribution ==
Paraelongatoolithus is known solely from Chengguan, Tiantai. The fossil is from the Chichengshan Formation, which is dated to 91–94 million years ago, during the Turonian.

== Discovery ==
Fossil eggs are very common in the Tiantai basin, and were first discovered there in the 1950s. Due to better infrastructure, in the 2000s numerous new types of fossil eggs have been discovered in Tiantai. Paraelongatoolithus was first discovered and named in 2010 by the Chinese paleontologists Wang Qiang, Wang Xiaolin, Zhao Zikui, and Jiang Yan'gen.

== Description ==
Paraelongatoolithu reticulatus is known from a single incomplete fossil egg. The preserved part is 7.2 cm (3 in) wide and 12.2 cm (5 in) long, but when complete, it was probably about 17 cm (7 in) long. The outer surface of its shell is decorated with nodes and ridges arranged into a net-like, or reticular, pattern. The eggshell is 0.5-0.6 mm thick, excluding the ornamentation. The pores in the eggshell are elliptical and irregularly distributed.

Like all elongatoolithids, Paraelongatoolithus has an eggshell clearly divided into two layers: the cone layer on the inside, and the columnar layer (also known as the continuous layer because the eggshell units form a continuum without well-defined boundaries between them) on the outside. In Paraelongatoolithus, both layers have very distinct growth lines, and the columnar layer is twice as thick as the cone layer.

Paraelongatoolithus is very similar to Porituberoolithus, but differs in the ornamentation.

== Paleobiology ==
Even though the sole Paraelongatoolithus specimen was not found with a preserved embryo or incubating parent, paleontologists have found numerous other such associations of elongatoolithids with oviraptorosaurs. Therefore, it is likely that Paraelongatoolithus was laid by an oviraptorosaur.
