= Ellipsoolithus =

Ellipsoolithus Temporal range: Maastrichtian ~72–66 Ma

Egg fossil classification
- Basic shell type: Ornithoid
- Morphotype: Ornithoid-ratite
- Oofamily: †Elongatoolithidae
- Oogenus: †Ellipsoolithus; Mohabey 1998

Dinosaur egg

Ellipsoolithus is an oogenus of dinosaur egg. It contains only a single oospecies, E. khedaensis. The species was found in the Upper Sandy Carbonate Member of the Lameta Formation of India. These eggs were probably laid by a theropod dinosaur.

== See also ==
- List of dinosaur oogenera
