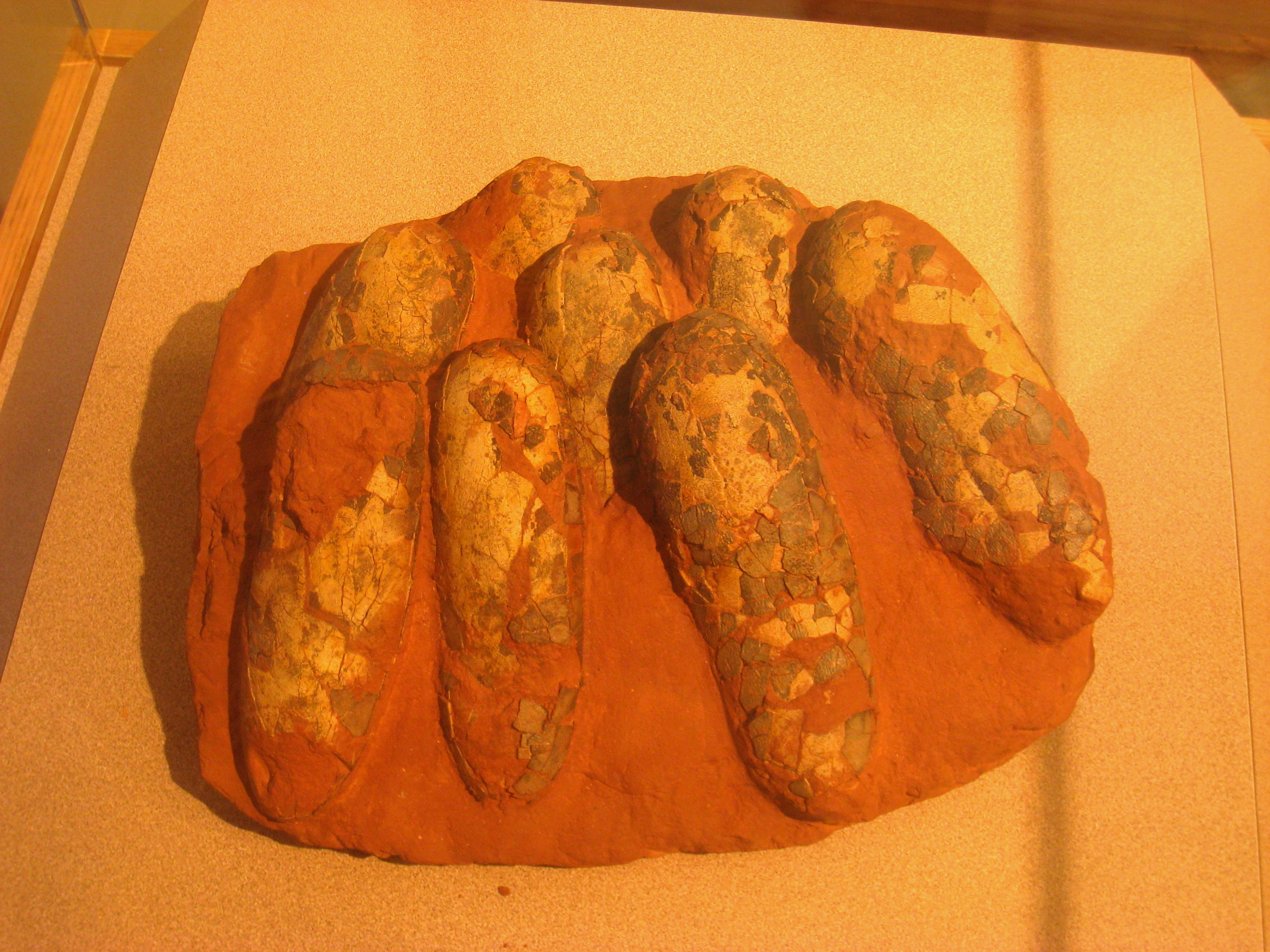
- Elongatoolithid eggs in the Academy of Natural Sciences, Philadelphia

Egg fossil classification
- Basic shell type: Ornithoid
- Morphotype: Ornithoid-ratite
- Oofamily: †Elongatoolithidae; Zhao, 1975

Oogenera
- Ellipsoolithus; Elongatoolithus (type); Heishanoolithus; Macroelongatoolithus; Macroolithus; Nanhsiungoolithus; Paraelongatoolithus; Porituberoolithus; Rodolphoolithus; Trachoolithus; Undulatoolithus

= Elongatoolithidae =

Elongatoolithidae Temporal range: Cretaceous-Paleocene

Oofamily of dinosaur eggs

Elongatoolithidae is an oofamily of fossil eggs, representing the eggs of oviraptorosaurs (with the exception of the avian Ornitholithus). They are known for their highly elongated shape. Elongatoolithids have been found in Europe, Asia, and both North and South America.

== Distribution ==
Elongatoolithids have a very broad distribution. They have been found across Asia and the US, as well as in Spain, France, and Argentina, with ages ranging from lower Cretaceous to the Paleocene.

== Description ==
Elongatoolithids are, as their name suggests, highly elongated eggs; they are at least twice as long as they are wide. They vary widely in size, ranging from the 7 cm long Elongatoolithus chichengshanensis to the gigantic 60 cm Macroelongatoolithus. All known clutches are laid in concentric circles of paired eggs, sometimes in up to three superimposed layers.

Elongatoolithid eggshells are made up of two layers: The inner layer, called the mammillary layer or the cone layer, is made up of radiating calcite crystals. The outer layer is distinctive for not being divided into well-defined shell units, and hence it is called the continuous layer or the cryptoprismatic layer. The boundary between the two layers is abrupt, but wavy. Typically, elongatoolithid eggs have an angusticanaliculate pore system, meaning the pores are thin, straight, and unbranching. The surface ornamentation of the eggshells varies from scattered nodes (dispersituberculate) to linear ridges (lineartuberculate), occasionally with nodes in long irregular chains (ramotuberculate).

== History ==
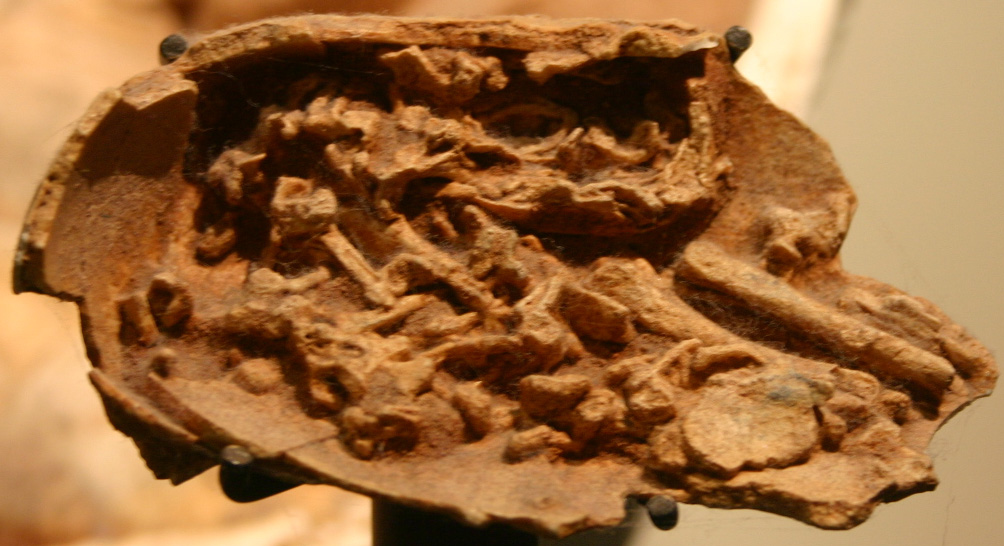
An elongatoolithid with embryo preserved inside

The first elongatoolithid eggs were discovered in the 1920s, and were thought to belong to Protoceratops. Oviraptor was first discovered in 1924 with a nest of elongatoolithid eggs, and it was conjectured to have been caught in the act of raiding a Protoceratops nest. Following the discovery of Troodon eggs in 1990, their close resemblance to elongatoolithids lead Russian paleontologist Konstantin Mikhailov to believe they were actually theropod eggs, not Protoceratops eggs. In 1994, his hypothesis was confirmed when Norell et al. discovered embryonic remains of an Oviraptorosaur inside an elongatoolithid egg. It was then hypothesized that Oviraptor was in fact a brooding mother, not an egg thief. Since then, several discoveries of embryos and association of adults with eggs have shown that elongatoolithids are the eggs of Oviraptorosaurs.

The first oospecies formally described was "Oolithes" elongatus (Young, 1954), from China. They were thought to belong to Protoceratops or a related dinosaur because of their similarity to the supposed Protoceratops eggs found in Mongolia. In 1975, Chinese paleontologist Zhao Zikui devised a formal classification system for fossil eggs, in which he created a new oogenus for "Oolithes" elongatus: Elongatoolithus. He classified Elongatoolithus and another new oogenus Macroolithus into a new oofamily, Elongatoolithidae.

The oogenus Spongioolithus, first named by Bray in 1999, was originally considered a member of Elongatoolithidae, but it is currently considered a junior synonym of the non-elongatoolithid Continuoolithus.

== Paleobiology ==
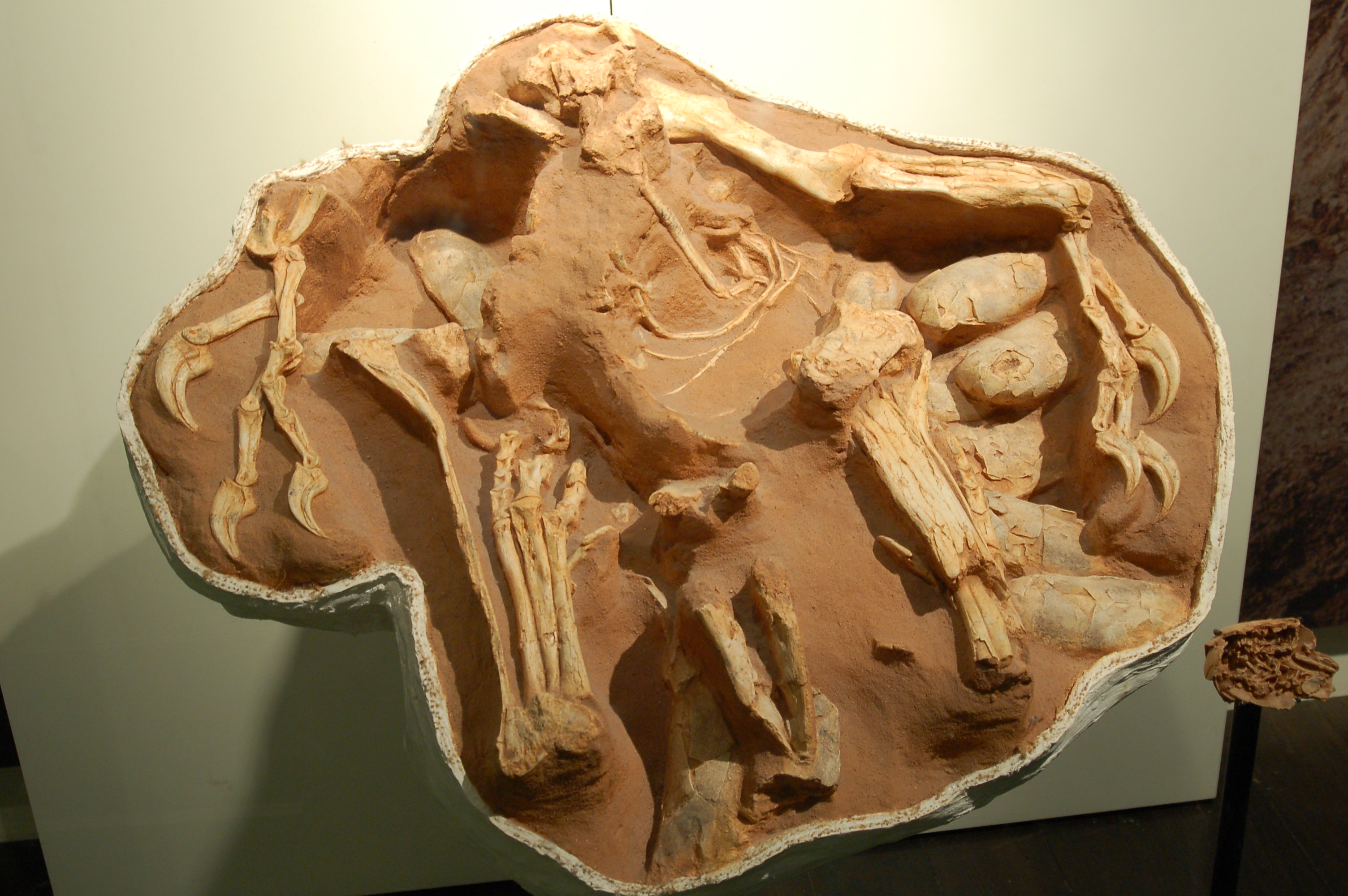
Citipati parent sitting on its nest of elongatoolithid eggs

Elongatoolithids are known to be the eggs of oviraptorosaurs (except for the avian Ornitholithus). Several oviraptorosaurs have been found in association with elongatoolithid eggs, including some specimens still inside the mother. Fossil embryos found inside elongatoolithid eggs have also been identified as oviraptorosaurian.

Several oviraptorosaurs, like Nemegtia, Citipati, Oviraptor, and cf. Machairasaurus, have been found sitting on top of their nests. All of them have their arms spread out over the eggs in a bird-like posture, and the parent's body would effectively cover the entire nest. This indicates intensive parental care of the eggs. It is not certain whether the specimens found brooding are male or female, but the examined limb bones of a brooding Citipati show none of the evidence of egg-laying that would be expected if theropods took phosphorus and calcium from long bone tissues (like crocodylians) or medullary bone (like birds), suggesting it was a male. Also, the clutches were proportionally large compared to the size of the adult, which suggests a polygamous system, similar to modern paleognaths, in which multiple females contribute eggs to a single nest which is then cared for by the father.

The eggs are laid in pairs, as shown by the discovery of two Macroolithus eggs simultaneously within the mother, and the pairing of eggs within nests. This shows that oviraptorosaurs had two functional oviducts (unlike birds, which have only one), and would produce two eggs at a time. Also, the relatively large size of the eggs indicates that a female could not lay more than one pair at a time.

== Parataxonomy ==
In the basic-type and morphotype scheme for eggshell classification (which is now typically disused), elongatoolithids are of the Ornithoid basic type and Ornithoid-Ratite morphotype. They are similar to the Troodon eggshells, which are now classified in the oofamily Prismatoolithidae.

Elongatoolithidae contains the oogenera Nanhsiungoolithus, Elongatoolithus, Macroolithus, Macroelongatoolithus, Ellipsoolithus, Trachoolithus, Heishanoolithus, Ornitholithus, Paraelongatoolithus, Undulatoolithus, and Rodolphoolithus. Also, Porituberoolithus and Continuoolithus are occasionally included in Elongatoolithidae.
