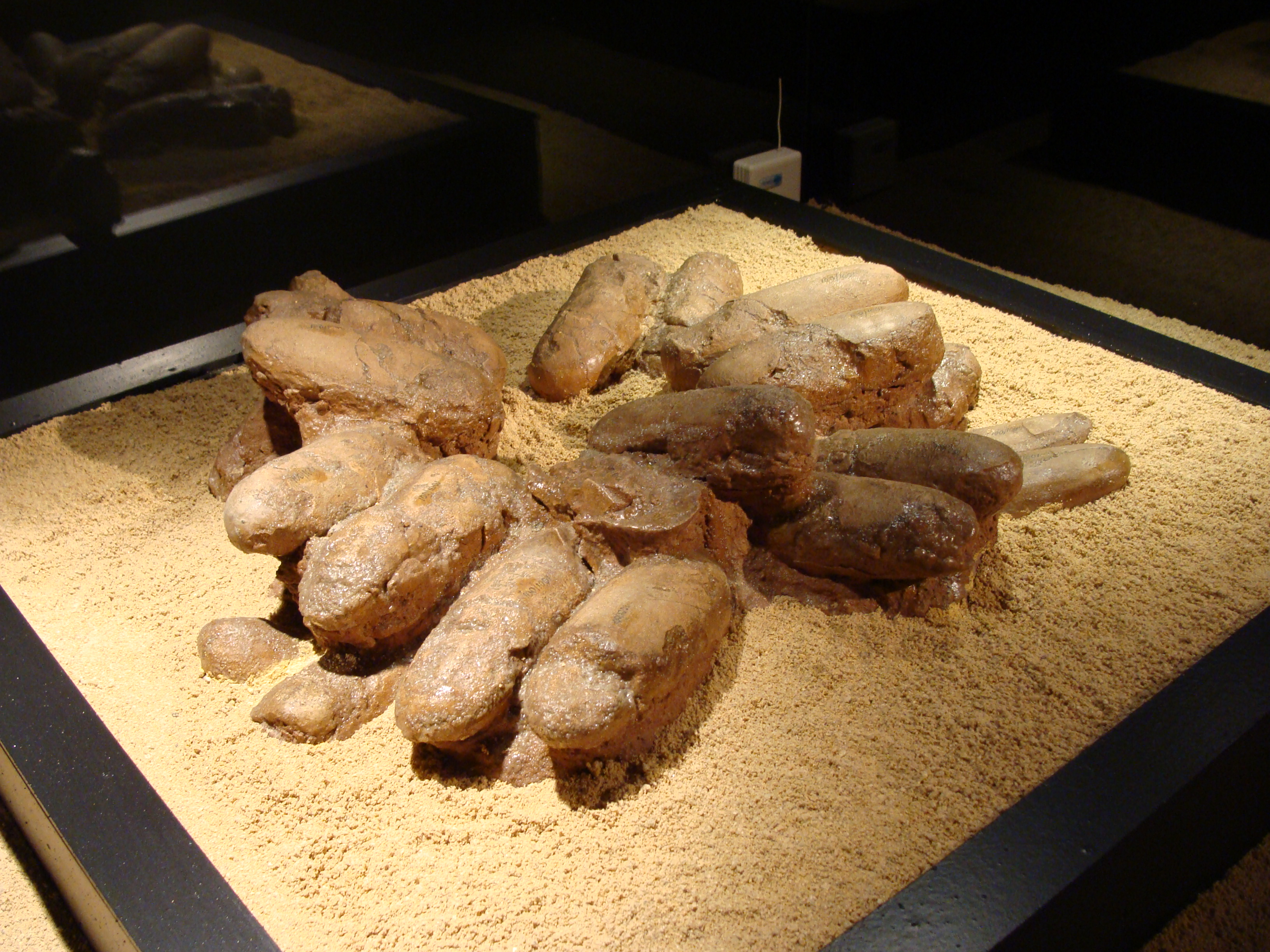
- Elongatoolithus excellens nest in CosmoCaixa Barcelona.

Egg fossil classification
- Basic shell type: Ornithoid
- Morphotype: Ornithoid-ratite
- Oofamily: †Elongatoolithidae
- Oogenus: †Elongatoolithus; Zhao, 1975

Type oospecies
- †Elongatoolithus andrewsi Zhao, 1975

Oospecies
- See text

= Elongatoolithus =

Elongatoolithus Temporal range: Late Cretaceous

Fossil dinosaur eggs

Elongatoolithus is an oogenus of dinosaur eggs found in the Late Cretaceous formations of China and Mongolia. Like other elongatoolithids, they were laid by small theropods (probably oviraptorosaurs), and were cared for and incubated by their parents until hatching. They are often found in nests arranged in multiple layers of concentric rings. As its name suggests, Elongatoolithus was a highly elongated form of egg. It is historically significant for being among the first fossil eggs given a parataxonomic name.

== Description ==
Elongatoolithus eggs are small to midsized eggs, with a maximum size of about 17 cm (6.7 in). The eggs are highly elongated, typically being 2 to 2.2 times longer than they are wide, and slightly asymmetric (with one end pointier than the other). The outer surface of their shells is ornamented with a fine pattern of nodes and ridges, either aligned parallel to the egg's long axis (lineartuberculate ornamentation) or in irregular chains (ramotuberculate ornamentation). At the ends of the egg, the ornamentation may become randomly dispersed nodes (dispersituberculate ornamentation). This ornamentation is less pronounced than that of the closely related Macroolithus.

In general, the shell of elongatoolithids is made up of two structural layers: the inner layer, called the mammillary (or cone) layer, is made up of cone-shaped structures called mammillae, and the outer layer, called the continuous layer, is made up of shell units fused together into a continuum with a scale-like, or squamatic, structure. Elongatoolithus has an abrupt boundary between these two layers, and the continuous layer is two to six times thicker than the mammillary layer. Wavy growth lines can be observed in the continuous layer parallel to the egg's surface. They have an angusticanalicute pore system, meaning that the eggshells have narrow, straight pores.

=== Oospecies ===
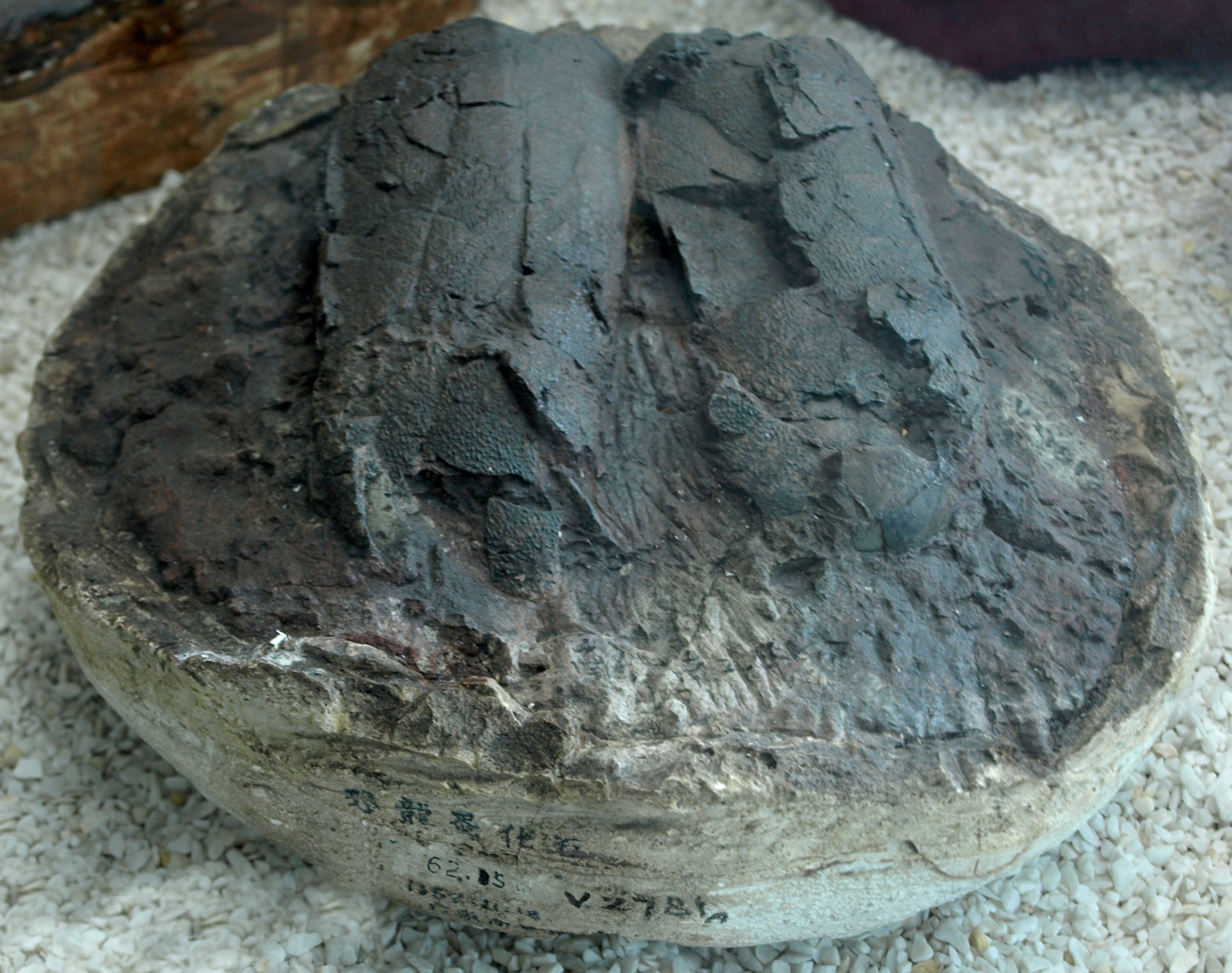
Pair of E. elongatus eggs, Paleozoological Museum of China

Several oospecies of Elongatoolithus are known. They can be broadly divided into two classes based on ornamentation: most oospecies have linear ridges parallel to the long axis of the egg, but some (notably E. sigillarius and E. excellens) a rippled pattern of reoriented ridges transverse to the egg's long axis. Within these two groups, oospecies vary primarily by eggshell thickness, ratio of continuous to mammillary layer, and overall size of the eggs. Identification of oospecies based on fragments (not whole eggs) can be problematic.

- E. andrewsi (type) - this oospecies was named after Protoceratops andrewsi, in reference to the now-outdated hypothesis that it was laid by a protoceratopsid dinosaur. Their eggshells range from 1.10 to 1.49 mm (0.043 to 0.059 in) thick, of which one fourth is the mammillary layer. They range in size from 138 to 151 mm (5.4 to 5.9 in) long by 63 to 77 mm (2.5 to 3.0 in) wide.
- E. excellens, meaning "graceful elongated egg", measures only 9–11 cm (3.5–4.3 in) long by 4 cm (1.6 in) across, making it the smallest Elongatoolithus oospecies, and possibly the smallest elongatoolithid. It has a correspondingly thin eggshell, measuring 0.3–0.9 mm (0.012–0.035 in) thick, predominantly ranging between 0.4 and 0.7 mm (0.016 and 0.028 in). It has a distinctive, rippling pattern of ridges around the equator of the egg (similar to E. sigillarius).
- E. frustrabilis, meaning "deceptive elongated egg", is similar to E. elongatus and E. andrewsi, but is larger, measuring 150–170 mm (5.9–6.7 in) long by 60–70 mm (2.4–2.8 in) wide. The shell thickness ranges from 0.8 to 1.5 mm (0.031 to 0.059 in), being thickest at the poles of the egg. It is the most common type of Elongatoolithus in the Djadokhta Formation of Mongolia.
- E. elongatus is an oospecies widespread in China. Its shell averages 0.91 mm (0.036 in) in thickness, of which one sixth is the mammillary layer. The complete eggs are 14 to 15 cm (5.5 to 5.9 in) long and 6.1 to 6.7 cm (2.4 to 2.6 in) wide.
- E. magnus is an oospecies native to Hunan. As the name (which means "large elongated egg") suggests, E. magnus eggs are large, measuring 162–172 mm (6.4–6.8 in) long by 63–82 mm (2.5–3.2 in) across. The shell is 0.68–0.90 mm (0.027–0.035 in) thick, about 1/6 of which is the mammillary layer. The boundary between the two layers is indistinct.
- E. sigillarius is known from a single, poorly preserved clutch from Mongolia (Nemegt Formation). Its name means "ornamented" in Latin, referring to the distinctive rippling or speckling of its eggshell. The eggshell thickness is 0.4–0.8 mm (0.016–0.031 in) in the equatorial region, but can range from 0.3 to 1.1 mm (0.012 to 0.043 in) over the whole egg. The complete eggs are 15–17 cm (5.9–6.7 in) long and 6–7 cm (2.4–2.8 in) wide.
- E. subtitectorius, meaning "thin-ribbed elongated egg", is a Mongolian oospecies with very well-defined striations on its eggshell. Its shell is relatively thin, only about 0.7–0.8 mm (0.028–0.031 in) thick (excluding ornamentation). The oospecies has only been discovered in fragments, so the size of the whole egg is unknown.
- E. taipinghuensis is named for Taipinghu, a lake in Anhui, China near to where it was discovered. It measures 17 cm (6.7 in) long by 6–7 cm (2.4–2.8 in) across.

== Paleobiology and parenting ==
=== Parenting ===
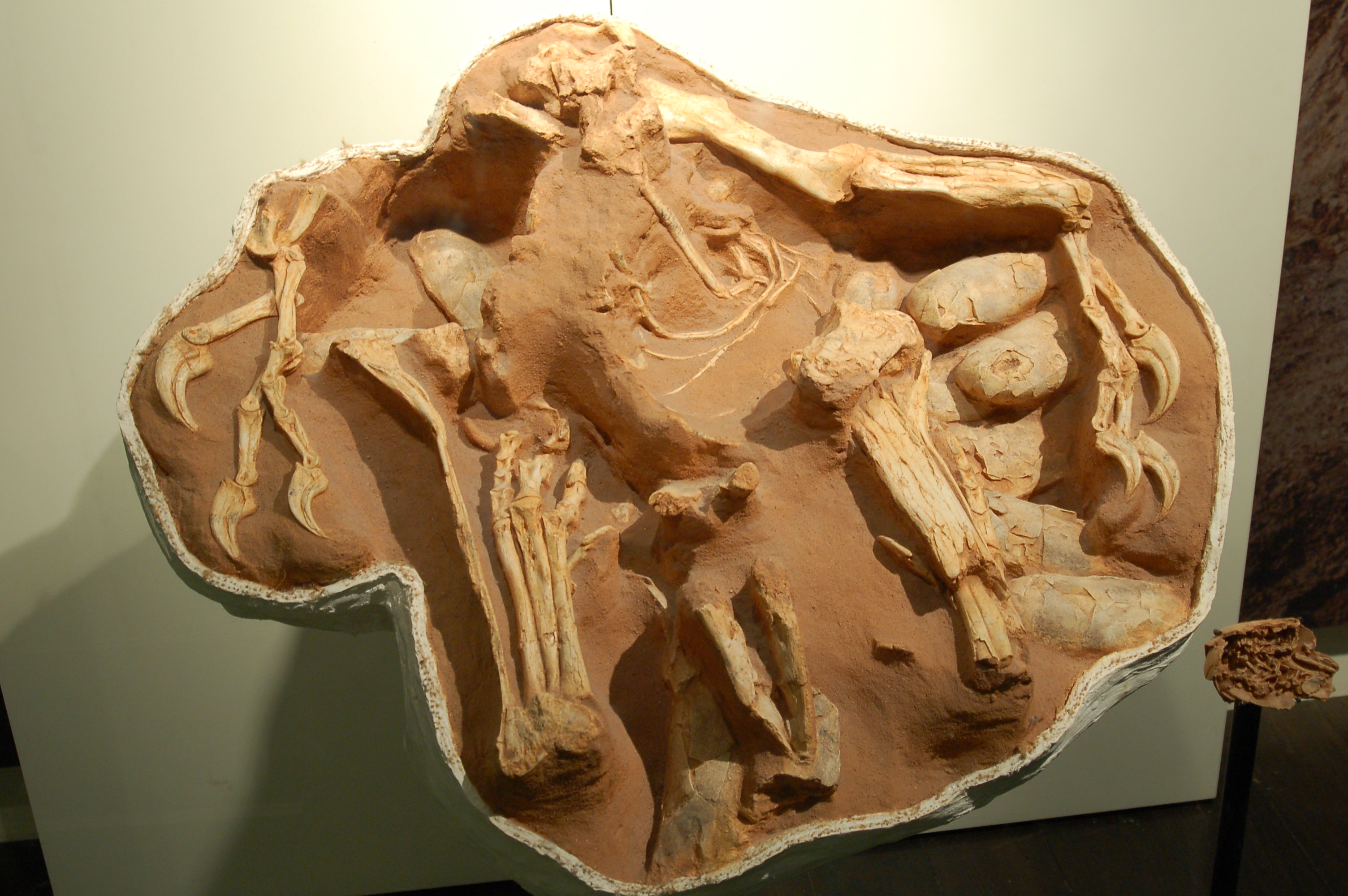
Fossil of Citipati parent sitting on its nest

Elongatoolithus were most likely laid by oviraptorosaurs. While most eggs are preserved without any trace of embryo or parent, several elongatoolithid nests have been found in association with skeletons of adult oviraptorosaurs. The parents apparently brooded on the nest to incubate the eggs. An adult Citipati skeleton was discovered in the Upper Cretaceous of Mongolia associated with a nest of eggs most likely referable to E. frustrabilis. Like many types of modern birds, Elongatoolithus nests would have been cared for by the father of a communal nest, which would contain eggs of several females.

=== Nests ===
Several nests of Elongatoolithus eggs are known. They follow the typical elongatoolithid pattern of arranging eggs in multi-layered circular nests. The type specimen of E. andrewsi consists of a well preserved nest, containing eleven eggs arranged in at least two circular layers. The type specimen of E. elongatus is a similarly structured, well preserved nest of 13 eggs. These eggs are broken, apparently because they had hatched before fossilizing. Like other elongatoolithids, the eggs are found paired because the parents would lay two eggs at a time. Unlike modern birds, dinosaurs had two functioning oviducts, so they could produce two eggs simultaneously, as shown by a fossil oviraptorosaur discovered in China with a pair of elongatoolithid eggs preserved in its pelvis.

Most, if not all, elongatoolithid nests would not have been buried by their parents. However, according to a statistical analysis of eggshell pore density by Tanaka et al. (2015), it is possible that E. elongatus eggs were buried.

== Classification ==
Fossilized eggs are classified in their own, parataxonomic system parallel to Linnaean taxonomy. Elongatoolithus and the closely related oogenera Macroolithus and Nanhsiungoolithus were the first oogenera described in this system. These oogenera are all classified in the oofamily Elongatoolithidae.

Elongatoolithus contains eight oospecies. The type oospecies was designated by Zhao 1975 as E. andrewsi, but some later publications list E. elongatus as the type. Five oospecies originally described as Elongatoolithus in fact belong to Prismatoolithidae: "E." chichengshanensis, "E." chimeiensis, "E." jiangchangensis, and "E." laijiaensis, and "E." tiantaiensis (which has been recombined as Prismatoolithus tiantaiensis).

== History ==
In 1954, Chinese paleontologist Yang Zhongjian described several fossil eggs from Laiyang, including an elongated type which he named "Oolithes" elongatus. He noted their similarity to Mongolian fossil eggs supposedly laid by Protoceratops, and therefore conjectured "O." elongatus was laid by a similar type of dinosaur. Later, in 1965, Yang discovered a comparable type of egg in Nanxiong. In 1975, the Chinese paleontologist Zhao Zikui published the prototype of the modern parataxonomic system for eggshell classification, dividing fossil eggs into oospecies, oogenera, and oofamilies. He named the oogenus Elongatoolithus to contain the majority Yang's "O." elongatus specimens, splitting it into two separate oospecies: E. andrewsi, based on a well-preserved nest described by Yang (1965), and E. elongatus for most of the rest of the "O." elongatus specimens. Two partially preserved "O." elongatus nests were reclassified into their own oogenus, Nanhsiungoolithus. He also noted that several types of fossil eggs from Mongolia and North America were also probably attributable to Elongatoolithus.

In 1979 another oospecies, E. magnus, was discovered and named by the Chinese paleontologists Zeng Demin and Zhang Jinjian, based on a nest of nine eggs uncovered in Hunan. They also described other Elongatoolithus specimens of an indeterminate oospecies.

In 1991, the Russian paleontologist Konstantin Mikhailov created the modern, formal classification scheme for fossil eggs. He used Zhao's naming conventions, keeping Elongatoolithus, Macroolithus, and Nanhsiungoolithus in Elongatoolithidae. He mentioned that several Mongolian eggs were referable to Elongatoolithidae or Elongatoolithus. He also recognized elongatoolithids to be theropod eggs, demonstrating their numerous structural differences from the supposed Protoceratops eggs. In 1994, when Mikhailov described and reviewed the fossil elongated eggs from Mongolia, he named four new oospecies of Elongatoolithus (E. excellens, E. frustrabilis, E. subtitectorius, and E. sigillarius) as well as mentioning two other unnamed forms. Also in 1994, the theropod parentage of Elongatoolithus was confirmed when an oviraptorid embryo was discovered preserved inside an elongatoolithid egg, which Mikhailov (1997) tentatively referred to Elongatoolithus.

The Chinese paleontologist Yu Xinqi named E. taipinghuensis, based on newly discovered remains from Anhui, in 1998.

In 2000, the Chinese paleontologists Fang Xiaosi, Wang Yaozhong, and Jiang Yan'gen described several ootaxa from the egg-rich Tiantai Basin, including the oospecies E. tiantaiensis. In 2003, Fang and his colleagues also described E. chichengshanensis and E. laijiaensis. However, Wang et al. 2010 questioned the referral of these oospecies to Elongatoolithus. They argued that E. chichengshanensis should belong to a new group, E. laijiaensis required further study to determine its affinities, and E. tiantaiensis should be moved to Prismatoolithidae. In 2011, Wang et al. formally recombined E. tiantaiensis as Prismatoolithus tiantaiensis. In 2016, Tanaka et al. also moved E. chichengensis and E. laijiaensis, as well as E. chimeiensis and E. jianchangensis (which had been named by Fang et al. in 2007) to Prismatoolithidae.
