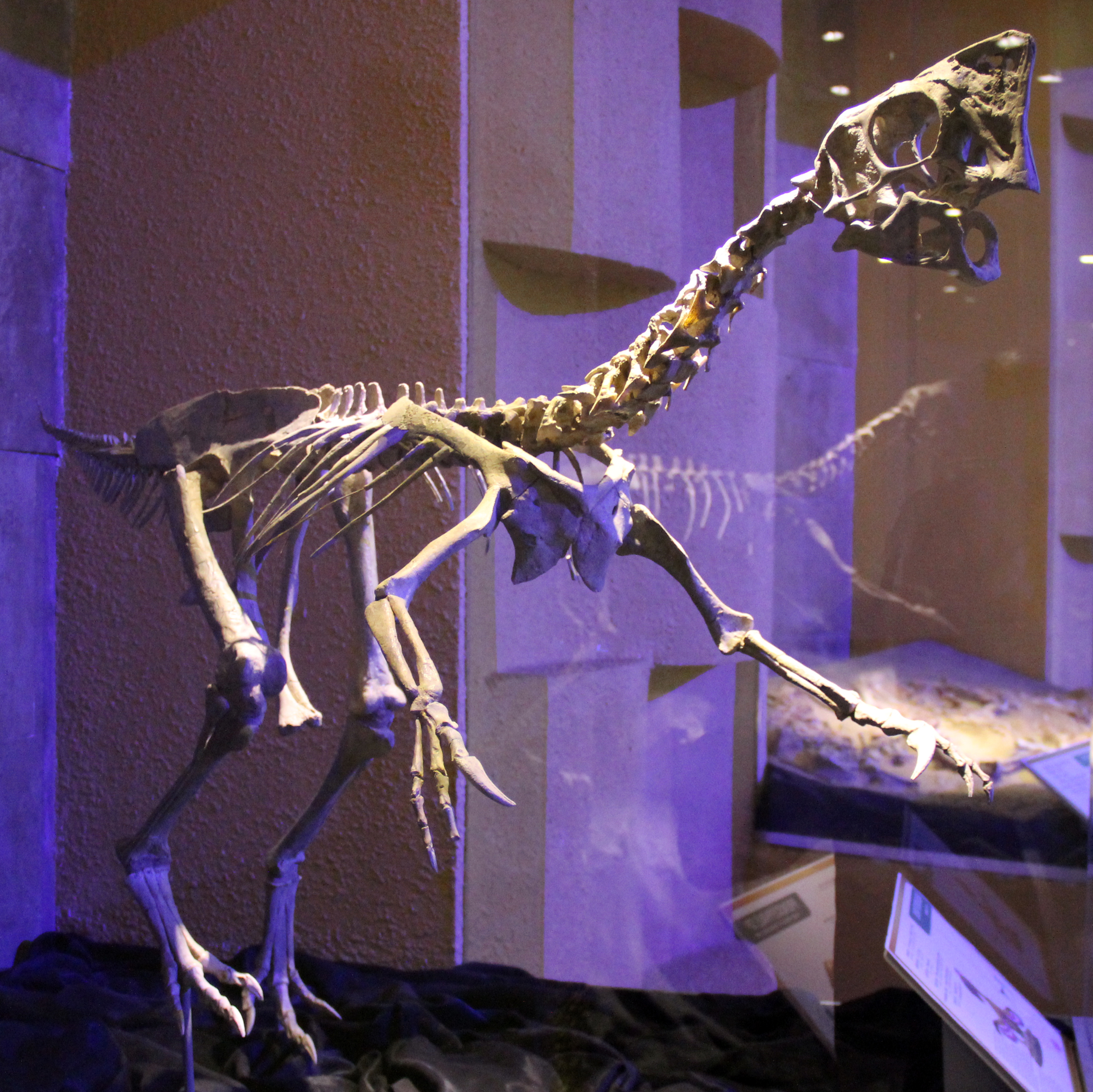
- Specimen tentatively assigned to Nemegtomaia, Central Museum of Mongolian Dinosaurs

Scientific classification
- Kingdom: Animalia
- Phylum: Chordata
- Class: Reptilia
- Clade: Dinosauria
- Clade: Saurischia
- Clade: Theropoda
- Family: †Oviraptoridae
- Subfamily: †Heyuanninae
- Genus: †Nemegtomaia; Lü et al., 2005

Type species
- †Nemegtomaia barsboldi (Lü et al., 2004)

Synonyms
- Nemegtia barsboldi Lü et al., 2004

= Nemegtomaia =

Nemegtomaia Temporal range: Late Cretaceous, 72–70 Ma

Extinct genus of dinosaurs

Nemegtomaia is a genus of oviraptorid dinosaur from what is now Mongolia that lived in the Late Cretaceous Period, about 72 to 70 million years ago. The first specimen was found in 1996, and became the basis of the new genus and species N. barsboldi in 2004. The original genus name was Nemegtia, but this was changed to Nemegtomaia in 2005, as the former name was preoccupied. The first part of the generic name refers to the Nemegt Basin, where the animal was found, and the second part means "good mother", in reference to the fact that oviraptorids are known to have brooded their eggs. The specific name honours the palaeontologist Rinchen Barsbold. Two more specimens were found in 2007, one of which was found on top of a nest with eggs, but the dinosaur had received its genus name before it was found associated with eggs.

Nemegtomaia is estimated to have been around 2 m (7 ft) in length, and to have weighed 40 kg (85 lb). As an oviraptorosaur, it would have been feathered. It had a deep, narrow, and short skull, with an arched crest. It was toothless, had a short snout with a parrot-like beak, and a pair of tooth-like projections on its palate. It had three fingers; the first was largest and bore a strong claw. Nemegtomaia is classified as a member of the oviraptorid subfamily Heyuanninae, and is the only known member of this group with a cranial crest. Though Nemegtomaia has been used to suggest that oviraptorosaurs were flightless birds, the clade is generally considered a group of non-avian dinosaurs.

The nesting Nemegtomaia specimen was placed on top of what was probably a ring of eggs, with its arms folded across them. None of the eggs are complete, but they are estimated to have been 5 to 6 cm (2 to 2.3 in) wide and 14 to 16 cm (5 to 6 in) long when intact. The specimen was found in a stratigraphic area that indicates Nemegtomaia preferred nesting near streams that would provide soft, sandy substrate and food. Nemegtomaia may have protected its eggs by covering them with its tail and wing feathers. The skeleton of the nesting specimen has damage that indicates it was scavenged by skin beetles. The diet of oviraptorids is uncertain, but their skulls are most similar to other animals that are known or thought to have been herbivorous. Nemegtomaia is known from the Nemegt and Baruungoyot formations, which are thought to represent humid and arid environments that coexisted in the same area.

== History of discovery ==
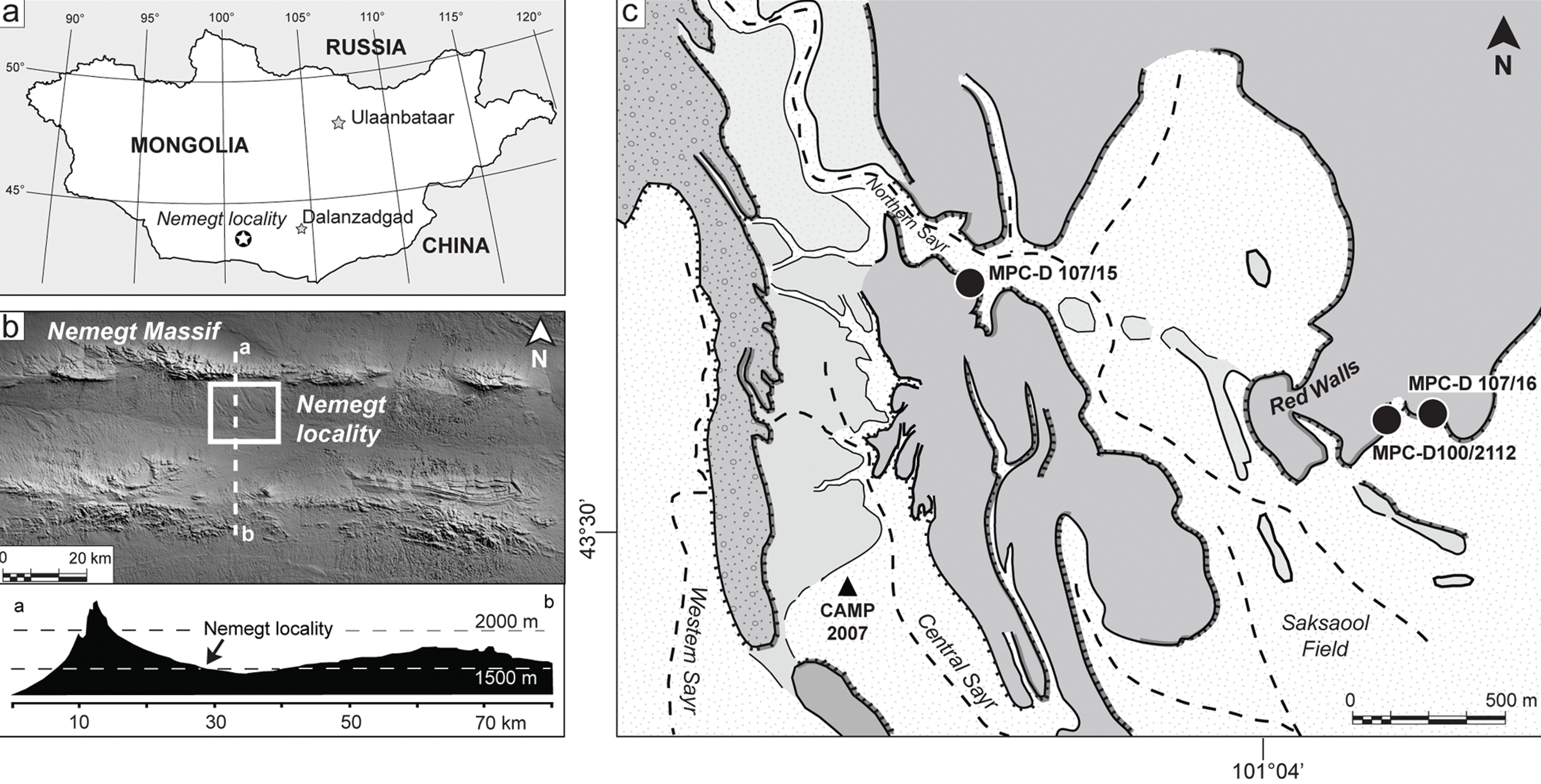
Maps showing the Nemegt locality (a, b) and where Nemegtomaia specimens have been found (c)

In 1996 the palaeontologist Yoshitsugu Kobayashi (as part of the "Mongolian Highland International Dinosaur Project" team) found an incomplete skeleton of an oviraptorid dinosaur in the Nemegt Formation of the Gobi Desert in southwestern Mongolia. The specimen (MPC-D 100/2112 at the Mongolian Palaeontological Center, formerly PC and GIN 100/2112), consists of a nearly complete skull and a partial skeleton, including cervical, dorsal, sacral, and caudal vertebrae, a left scapula, the lower ends of both humeri, the right radius, both ilia, the upper ends of both pubic bones, both ischia, and the upper end of a femur. The specimen was described as a new specimen of the genus Ingenia (referred to as Ingenia sp.; of uncertain species) by the palaeontologist Lü Junchang and colleagues in 2002, and used to highlight the similarities between oviraptorosaurs and birds.

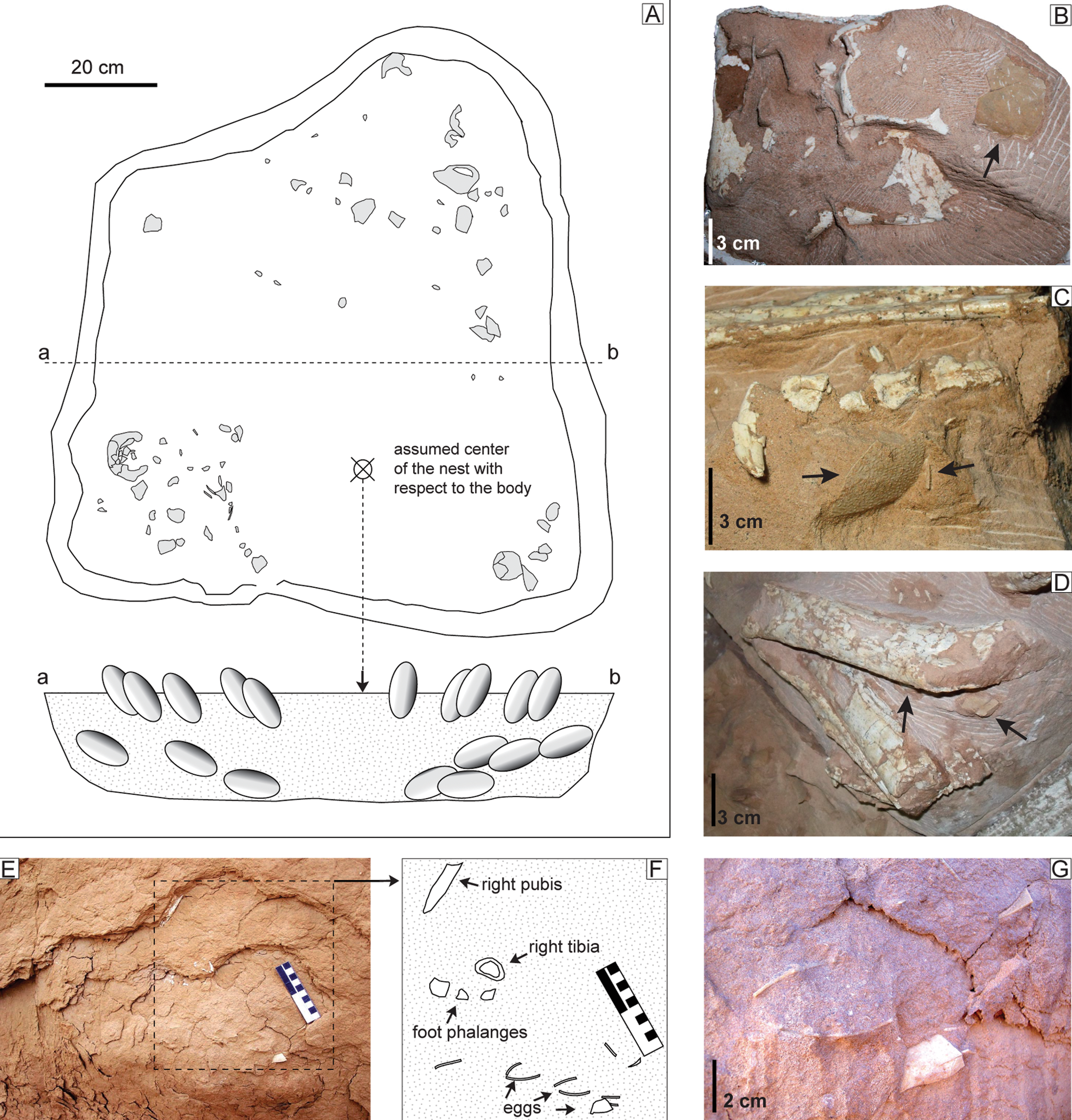
Nest diagram (A), bones of the nesting specimen that covered eggs (B–D), and a lower layer of eggs (E–G)

In 2004 Lü and colleagues determined that the skeleton belonged to a new, distinct taxon, and made it the holotype specimen of Nemegtia barsboldi. The genus name refers to the Nemegt Basin, and the specific name honours the palaeontologist Rinchen Barsbold, the leader of the team that found the specimen. In 2005 the describers discovered (after being notified by a biologist) that the name Nemegtia had already been used for a genus of freshwater seed shrimp (Ostracoda) from the same formation in 1978, and was therefore preoccupied. They proposed instead the new genus name Nemegtomaia ("maia" means "good mother" in Greek, and the full name means "good mother of the Nemegt"), making reference to the then-recent discovery that oviraptorids brooded eggs rather than stealing them, though no trace of a nest or eggs had yet been found associated with Nemegtomaia itself.

The first known member of the oviraptorid family was found with a nest of eggs originally thought to have belonged to the ceratopsian genus Protoceratops, and was therefore named Oviraptor in 1924; this name means "egg-seizer". In the 1990s more oviraptorid specimens were discovered associated with nests and eggs, wherein oviraptorid embryos were found, thereby proving that the eggs belonged to the oviraptorids themselves. Ingenia was similarly renamed as Ajancingenia in 2013, since the former genus name was preoccupied by a roundworm (Nematoda).

=== Assigned specimens ===
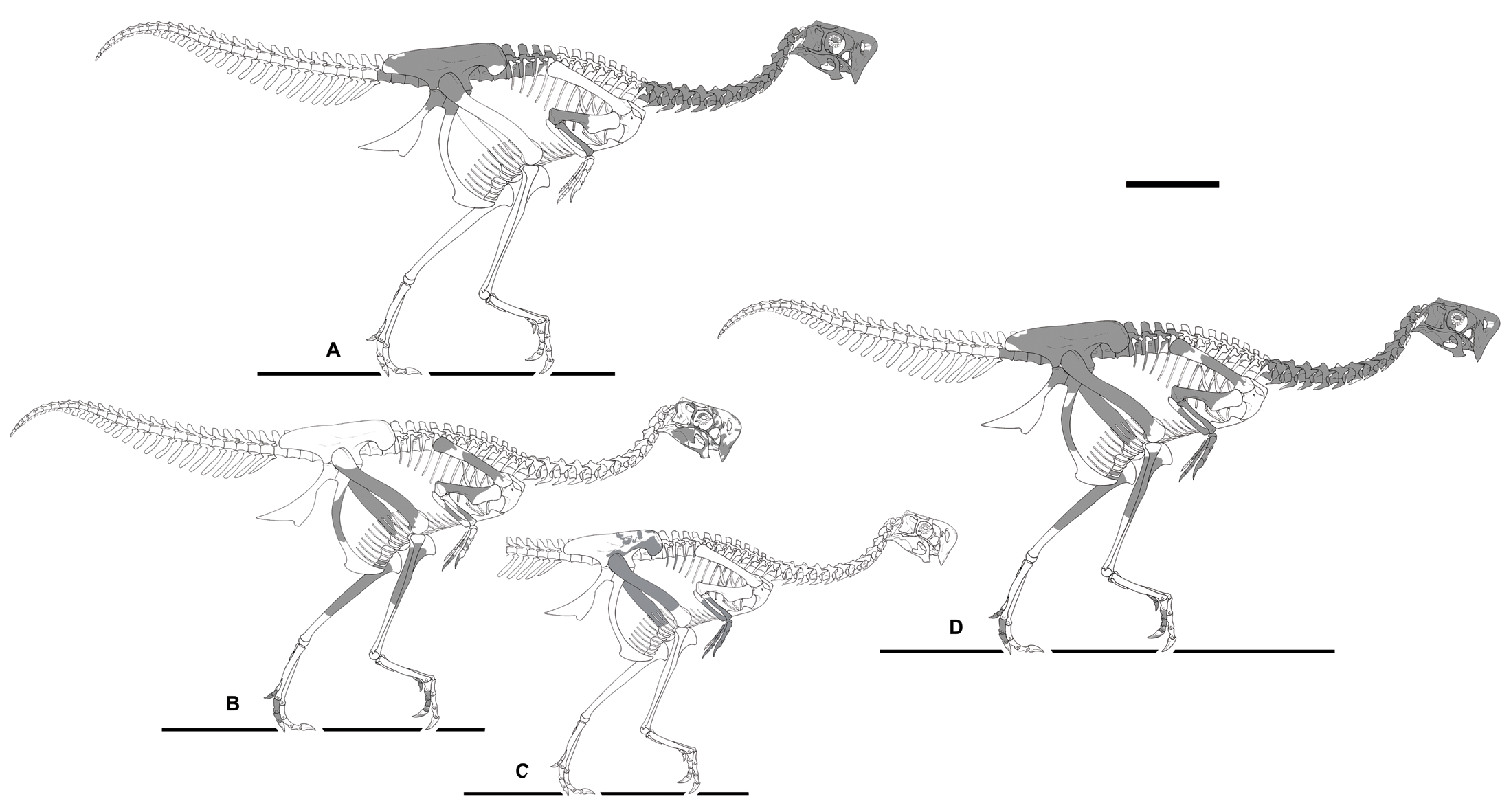
Skeletal diagrams showing the preserved elements of the three known specimens in grey, composite on right

In 2007 two new specimens of Nemegtomaia were found by the "Dinosaurs of the Gobi" expedition, and were described by the palaeontologist Federico Fanti and colleagues in 2013. The first specimen, MPC-D 107/15, was found by Fanti (who nicknamed it "Mary") in the Baruungoyot Formation, and consists of a nest with the presumed parent on top. As the fourth genus of oviraptorid found on top of a nest (after Oviraptor, Citipati, and cf. Machairasaurus), Nemegtomaia had therefore received a genus name referring to this feature before it was itself found associated with eggs. The specimen was excavated from a vertical cliff under "difficult circumstances", including heavy rain and collapsing sandstone blocks.

The nesting skeleton preserves parts of the skull, both scapulae, the left arm and hand, the right humerus, the pubic bones, the ischia, the femora, the tibiae, fibulae, and the lower portions of both feet. This specimen was found less than 500 m (1640 ft) from the holotype, and was of the same size; it was assigned to Nemegtomaia due to its similar anatomical features and geographical proximity. It was collected in a single block so that the spatial relationship of the bones and eggs would be preserved. The second specimen, MPC-D 107/16, was found by the palaeontologist Nicholas R. Longrich in the Nemegt Formation, and consists of the hands, a partial left ulna and radius, ribs, a partial pelvis, and both femora. This specimen was 35% smaller than the others, and was assigned to Nemegtomaia due to its hands having the same characteristics as those of specimen MPC-D 107/15. It is possible that the hands may have belonged to a different individual, as they were not found articulated with the rest of the skeleton (other oviraptorids are known from quarries with multiple skeletons), but this cannot be confirmed.

== Description ==
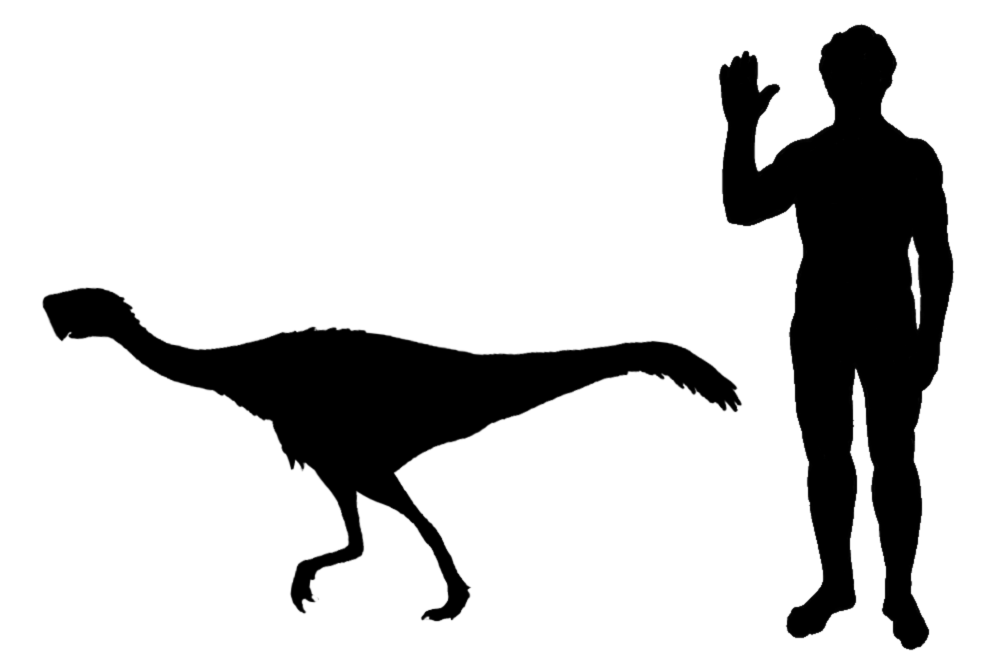
Size compared to a human

Nemegtomaia is estimated to have been around 2 m (7 ft) in length, and to have weighed 40 kg (85 lb), a size extrapolated from more completely known relatives. As an oviraptorosaur, it would have been feathered. Though Nemegtomaia does not possess any single feature that distinguishes it from other oviraptorids (autapomorphies), the combination of a crest, an enlarged first finger, and a high number of sacral vertebrae (eight), is unique to this taxon.

=== Skull ===
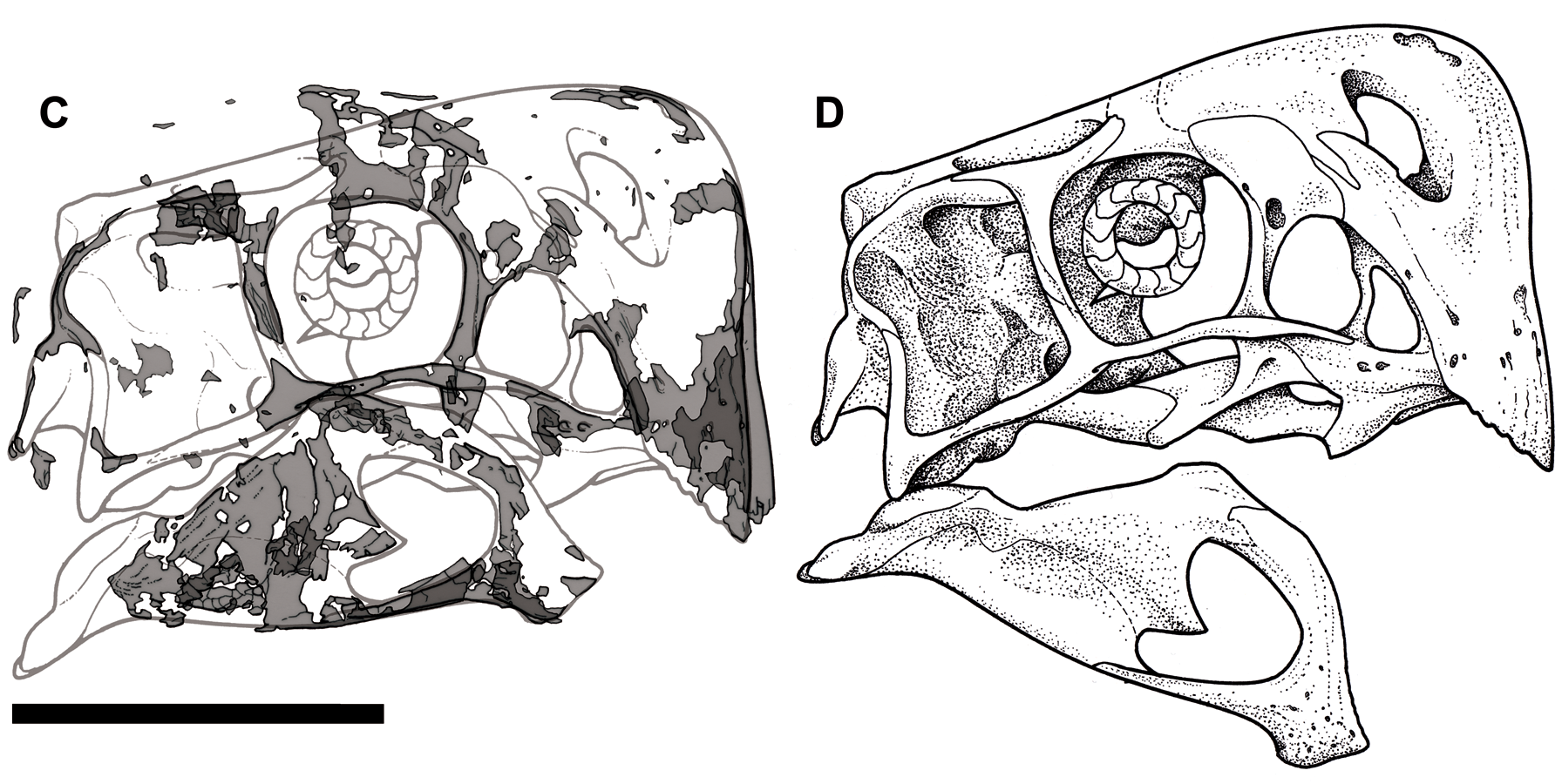
Preserved parts and reconstruction of specimen MPC-D 107/15's skull

The skull of Nemegtomaia was deep, narrow, and short (compared to the rest of the body), and reached 179 mm (7 in) in length. It had a well-developed crest, formed by the nasal and premaxilla bones (mainly the latter) of the snout. The nearly vertical front margin of the holotype's crest formed an almost 90 degree angle with the upper margin of the skull. Compared to other oviraptorids, the nasal processes (projections) of the premaxillae were barely visible when viewed from above (where they connected with the nasal bones on the highest points of the crest). The crest extended hindwards and down, forming a round arch at the highest point. The diameter of the orbit (eye opening) was 52 mm (2 in); the eyes looked large due to the shortness of the skull. The antorbital cavity in front of the eye consisted of two fenestrae (openings); a large antorbital fenestra at the back, and a small maxillary fenestra at the front. Nemegtomaia was distinct from other oviraptorids in that the frontal bone on the midline of the skull was about 25% the length of the parietal bone from front to back. The nares (external nostrils) were relatively small and placed high on the skull.

The jaws of Nemegtomaia were toothless, and like other oviraptorid dinosaurs, it had a short snout with a deep, robust, and somewhat parrot-like beak. It had a hard palate formed by the premaxillae, vomers, and maxillae, like other oviraptorids. The palate was strongly concave (downwards-projecting), and had a cleft on the central part. As in other oviraptorids, it had a pair of tooth-like projections on the palate that were directed downwards (a feature that has been called "pseudo-teeth"). Nemegtomaia had small foramina (openings) on the sides of the suture (joint) between the premaxillae at the front of the snout, which may have been nutrient openings (and which indicate the presence of a keratinous bill). The lower jaw was short and deep, with a convex lower surface, and reached 153 mm (6 in) in length. The dentary bone of the lower jaw reached 50 mm (2 in) at its highest point. The mandibular symphysis (where the two-halves of the lower jaw connected) was short, deep, and very pneumatised (with air-spaces). The mandibular fenestra was large and was located at the front part of the lower jaw. As in most other oviraptorids, the front of the lower jaw was down-turned.

=== Postcranial skeleton ===
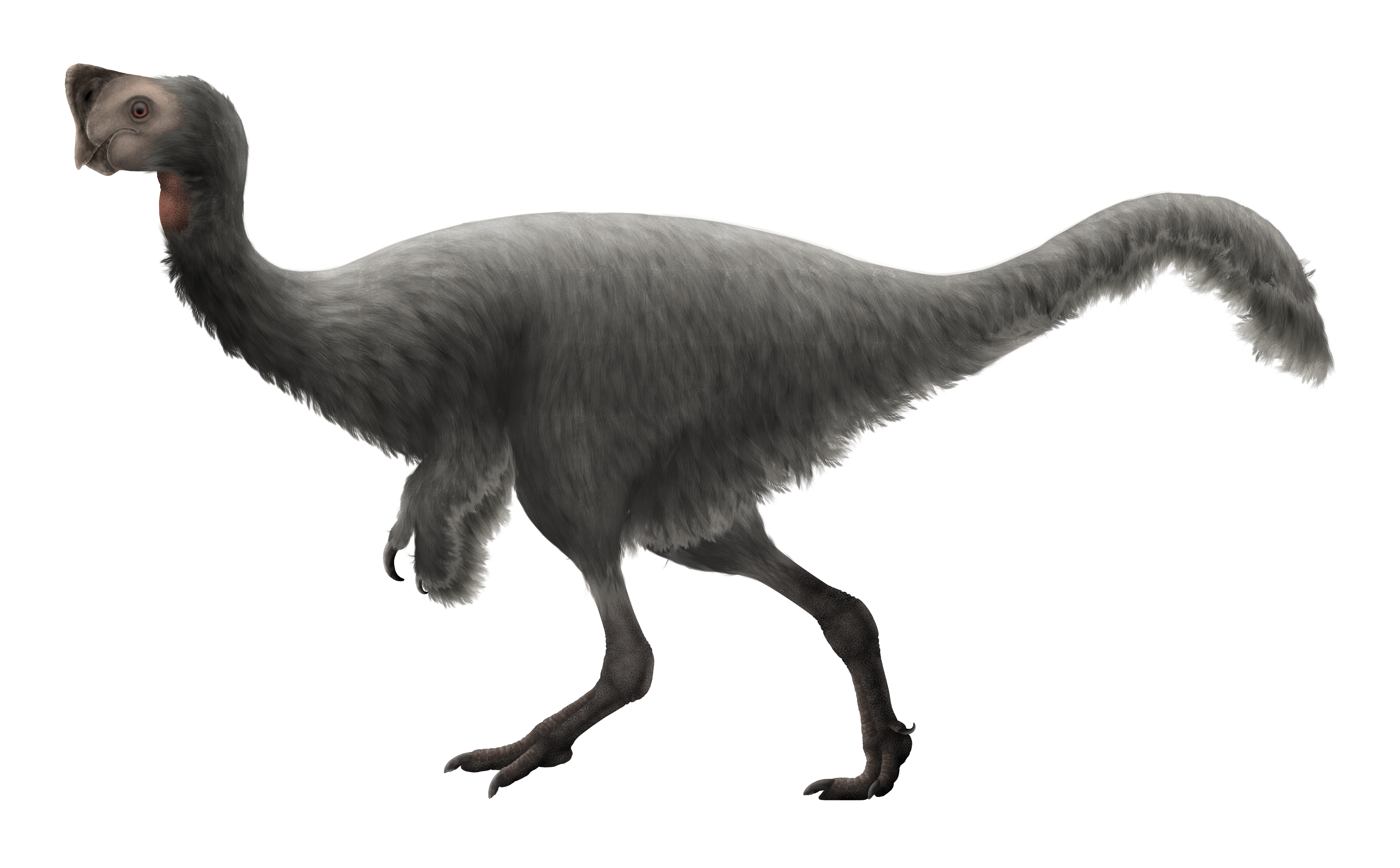
Life restoration

The neural spines of the neck (cervical) vertebrae were short, and the neural arches had an x-shaped appearance. The middle three of these vertebrae were the largest. The scapula (shoulder blade) appears to have been 185 mm (7 in) in total length. The humerus (upper arm bone) had a fossa (depression) in a position similar to modern birds, but atypical among oviraptorosaurs, and appears to have been 152 mm (6 in) long. The radius of the lower arm was straight, oval in cross-section, and may have been 144 mm (5 in) long. The first finger was relatively large and had a strong ungual (claw bone), and was more massive than the two other fingers. The second finger was slightly longer than the first, and the third finger was the smallest. The upper margin of the ilium of the pelvis was straight, and though both ilia were close to each other, they were not fused together. The pubic shaft was turned backwards. The femur (thigh bone) is estimated to have been 286 mm (11 in) long, and the tibia of the lower leg 317 mm long (12 in).

== Classification ==
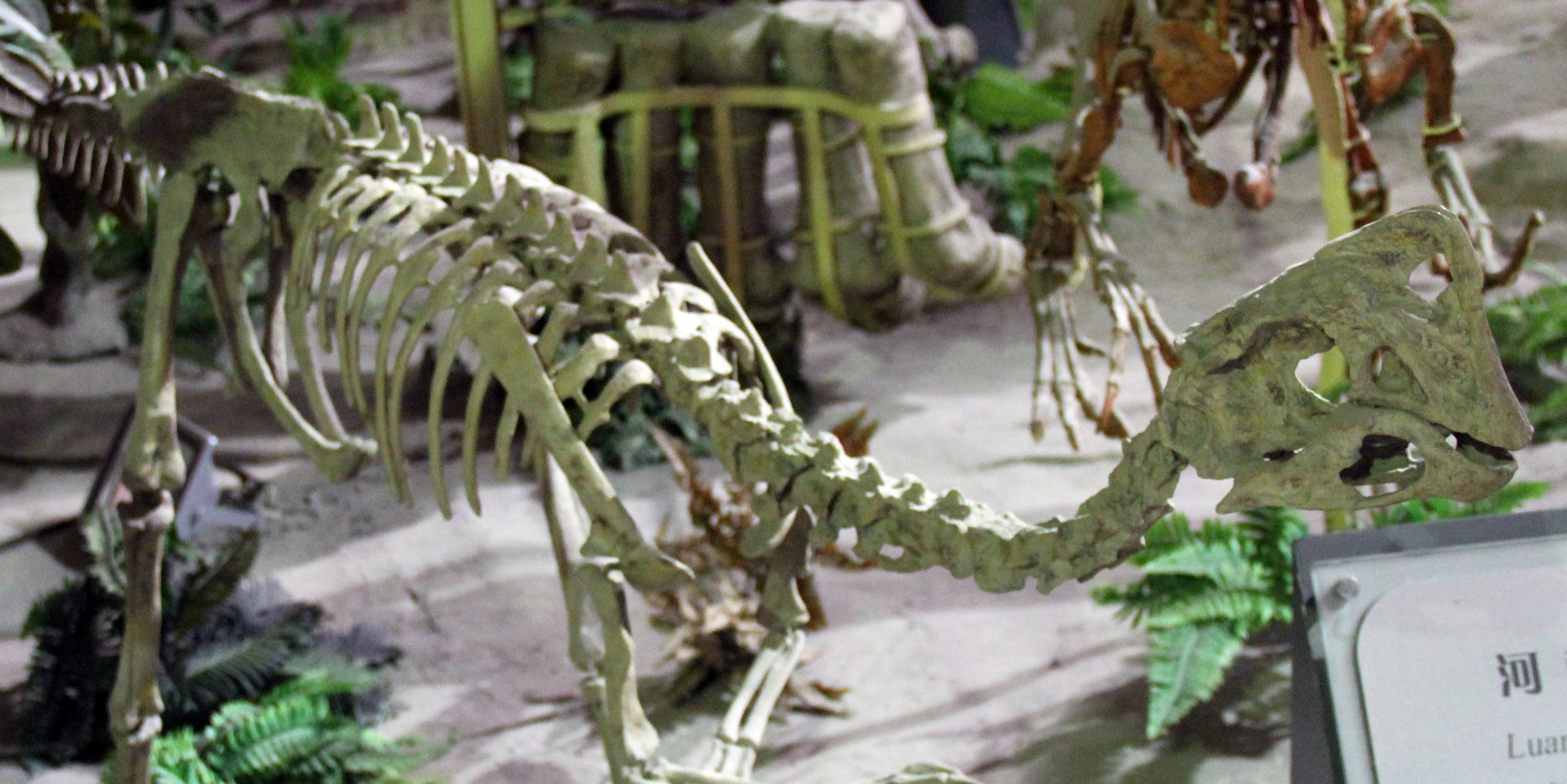
Reconstructed skeleton, Henan Geological Museum

In their 2004 phylogenetic analysis, Lü and colleagues classified Nemegtomaia as a derived (or "advanced") oviraptorosaur, and found it to be most closely related to the genus Citipati. In 2010 Longrich and colleagues determined that Nemegtomaia belonged in the family Oviraptoridae, as part of the subfamily Ingeniinae, making it the only member of the latter group with a prominent crest. Members of the other recognised subfamily, Oviraptorinae, all possess crests. Members of this subfamily were distinguished by smaller size, short and robust forelimbs with weakly curved claws, the number of vertebrae in the synsacrum, as well as certain features of the feet and pelvis. Longrich and colleagues suggested that the presence of a crest on Nemegtomaia makes it possible that this feature evolved or disappeared several times among oviraptorids, or that the animal may not have been an ingeniine. In 2010, the palaeontologist Gregory S. Paul suggested that crestless oviraptorids were either the juveniles or females of otherwise crested species, and that the number of genera in the group was therefore exaggerated. He listed Nemegtomaia as "Citipati (=Nemegtomaia) barsboldi, considering it very similar to that genus, but in 2016, he instead listed it as "Conchoraptor (=Nemegtomaia) barsboldi".

In 2012 Fanti and colleagues also found Nemegtomaia to be part of Ingeniinae as a derived member, closest to Heyuannia, due to the proportions of the hands of the two new specimens (relatively short with a robust first finger). They stated that, though the presence of crests is generally associated with oviraptorines rather than ingeniines, the feature may be correlated with size and maturity. They pointed out that the nasal and frontal bones of the ingeniine Conchoraptor were pneumatic and could potentially have grown into a crest as the animal matured, though all known skeletons of that genus are of the same small size (and one specimen appears to have been fully grown). The subfamily name Ingeniinae has since been replaced by the name Heyuanninae (since Ingenia was preoccupied). The cladogram below shows the placement of Nemegtomaia within Oviraptoridae, according to Fanti et al., 2012:

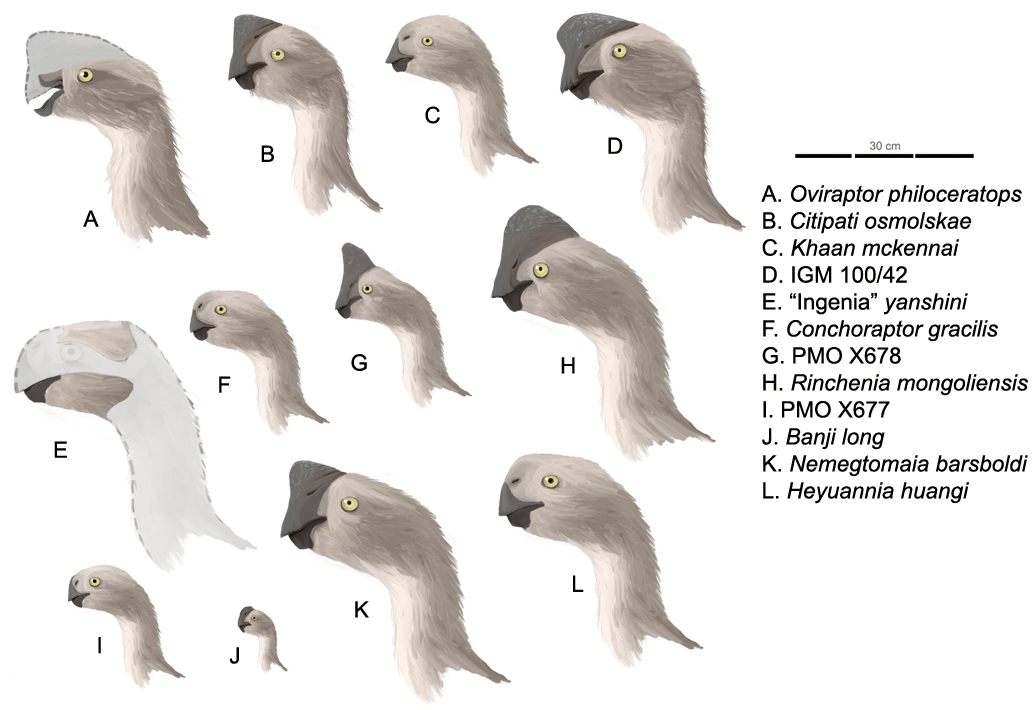
Restorations of oviraptorid heads shown to scale; K (bottom middle) is Nemegtomaia

- Oviraptoridae
  - Oviraptor
  - unnamed
    - Rinchenia
    - Citipati
  - unnamed
    - Khaan
    - unnamed
      - Conchoraptor
      - unnamed
        - Machairasaurus
        - unnamed
          - "Ingenia" (=Ajancingenia)
          - unnamed
            - Nemegtomaia
            - Heyuannia

=== Evolution ===
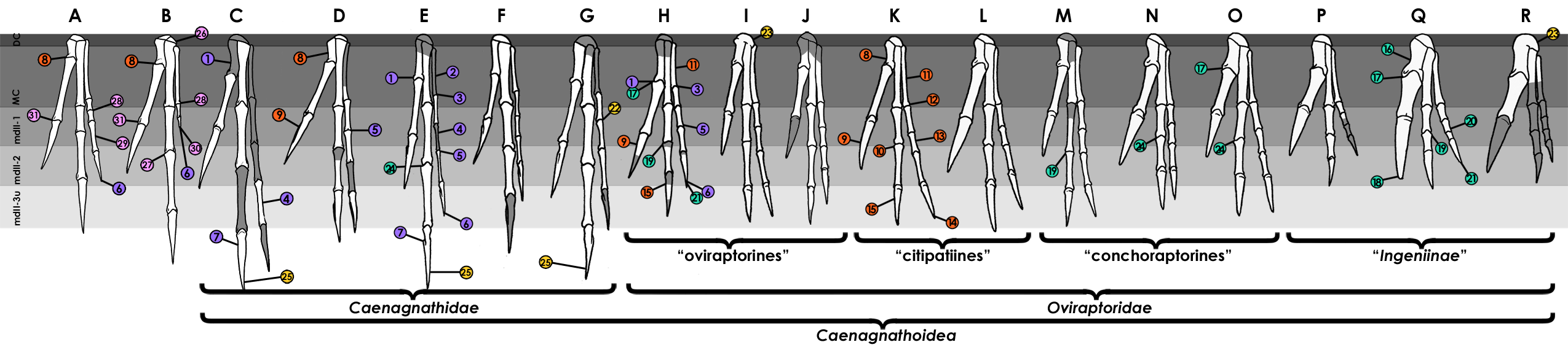
Hand bones of oviraptorosaurs compared; P (far right) is the hand of Nemegtomaia, grouped within Ingeniinae (=Heyuanninae)

The clade Oviraptorosauria is generally regarded as a group of non-avian (or non-bird) theropod dinosaurs, and their similarity to birds (Aves) has often been noted. Fossils of oviraptorosaurs in the family Caenagnathidae have historically been confused with those of birds, and some researchers have gone so far as to consider oviraptorosaurs as a whole more closely related to birds than to other non-avian dinosaurs. In 2002 Lü and colleagues used the then unnamed Nemegtomaia to show similarities between birds and oviraptorosaurs, and found the latter group to be closer to birds than to bird-like dinosaurs such as dromaeosaurs. They therefore concluded that oviraptorosaurs were flightless birds rather than non-avian dinosaurs, and noted that the boundary between birds and dinosaurs was becoming more and more difficult to delineate. Other researchers have instead found dromaeosaurs and troodontids to be most closely related to birds, together forming the group Paraves; oviraptorosaurs, therizinosaurs, and alvarezsaurs are just outside this group. The wider group that includes oviraptorosaurs and Paraves is called Pennaraptora, and this group is defined by the presence of pennaceous feathers (feathers with a stalk).

Oviraptorosaurs are known from Asia (where they may have originated) and North America, and are mainly known from deposits that date from the Campanian-Maastrichtian ages of the Cretaceous period. The group includes small to large members, and they are characterised by their short skulls and beaks, elongated fingers, and short tails. Basal (or "primitive") members had teeth, which disappeared in derived members of the group (those within the superfamily Caenagnathoidea, which includes Oviraptoridae). They were at least partially herbivorous, and brooded their nests in a bird-like posture. Though they are all thought to have been feathered, they appear to have been flightless. Cranial crests appear to have evolved convergently in different lineages within the group. The family Oviraptoridae (to which Nemegtomaia belongs) consisted of generally small members, and is exclusively known from the Upper Cretaceous of Asia, with most genera having been discovered in the Gobi Desert of Mongolia and China. Including Nemegtomaia, at least nine oviraptorid genera have been discovered in a relatively small geographical area in the Gobi Desert.

== Palaeobiology ==
=== Reproduction ===
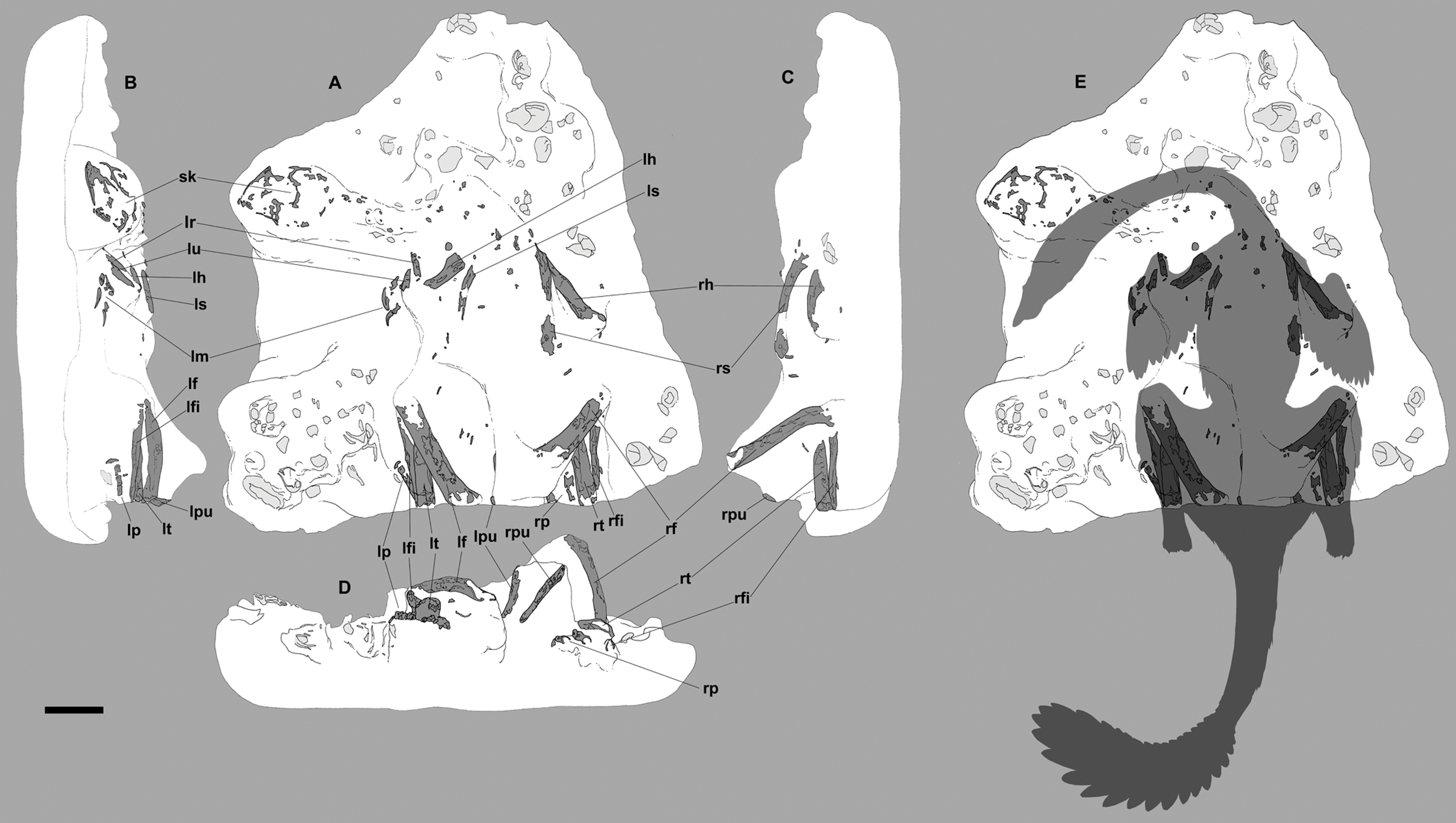
Diagram showing the remains and body outline of the nesting specimen

The Nemegtomaia specimen MPC-D 107/15 was found associated with a nest with eggs; its feet were placed in the centre of what was probably a ring of eggs, with the arms folded across the tops of the eggs on each side of the body, a posture similar to what is seen in other fossils of brooding oviraptorids. The collected part of the nest is about 90 cm (35 in) wide and 100 cm (30 in) long; the skeleton occupies the upper 25 cm (10 in) of the block, whereas the remaining 20 cm (8 in) is occupied by broken eggs and shells. There is no evidence of plant material in the nest, but there are fragments of undetermined bones. The nest does not preserve any complete eggs or embryos, which prevents determination of the size, shape, number, and arrangement of the eggs in the nest. It is probable that there were originally two layers of eggs below the body, and there do not appear to have been eggs in the centre of the nest.

Most eggs (seven distinct eggs have been identified) and egg fragments were recovered either in the lower layer of the nest or under the skull, neck, and limbs of the specimen, and the bones either rested directly on the eggs or were within 5 mm (0.2 in) of their surfaces. That the skeleton was directly positioned on top of it shows that the nest was not completely covered by sand. Though the placement of the eggs does not suggest a specific arrangement in the nest, most other oviraptorid nests show that the eggs were arranged in pairs in up to three levels of concentric circles. The eggs of MPC-D 107/15 were therefore most likely displaced during burial, or by external factors, such as strong winds, sandstorms, or predators. This also supports the idea that the upper layer of eggs was not buried, as fully buried eggs would have been less likely to be transported by external factors.

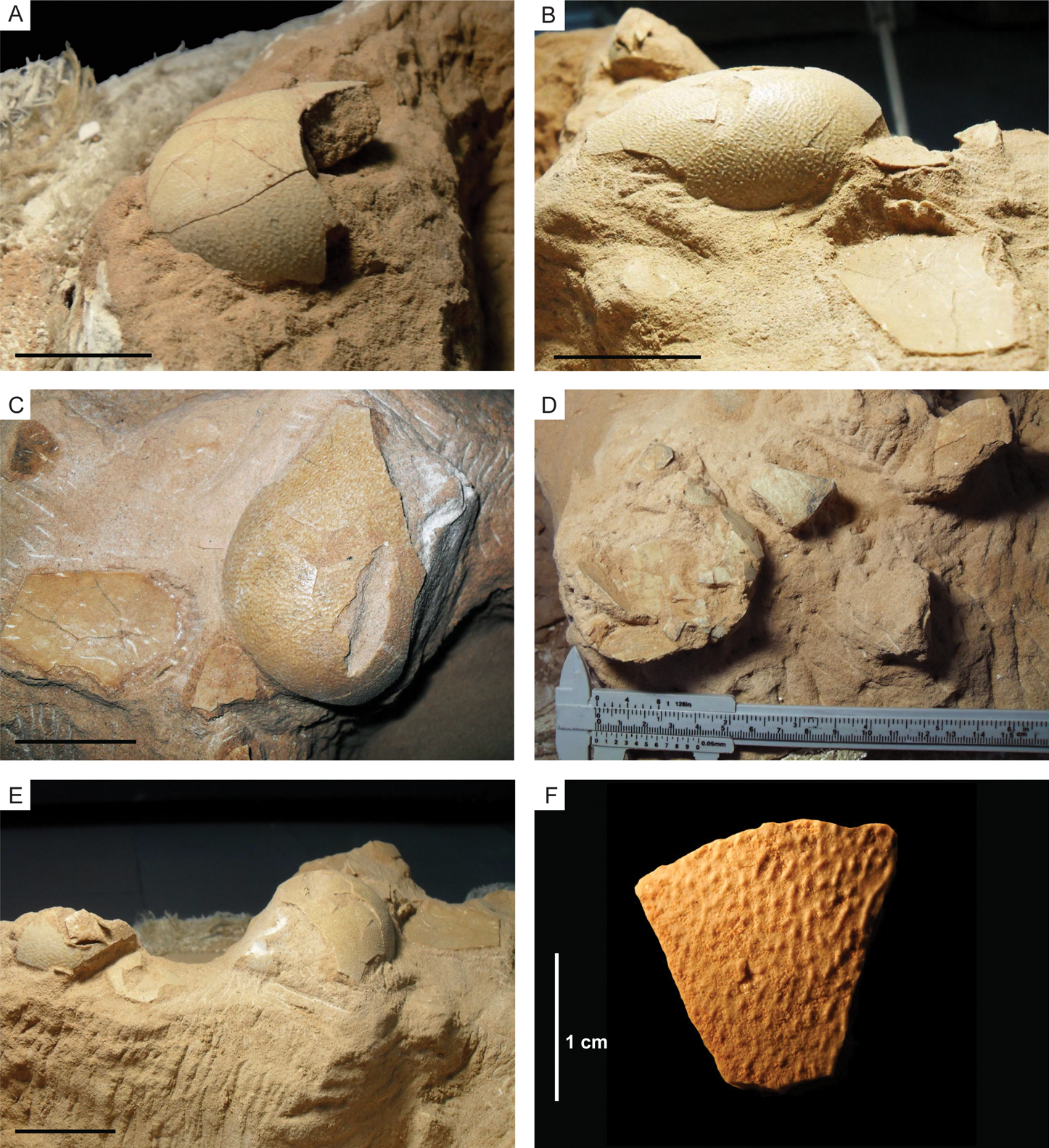
Details of eggs preserved with the nesting specimen

Oviraptorid eggs appear to have been 17 cm (6 in) long on average, and the most complete eggs found with MPC-D 107/15 are thought to have been 5 to 6 cm (2 to 2.3 in) wide and 14 to 16 cm (5 to 6 in) long when intact. The eggs are nearly identical to some that have previously been found in Mongolia, and have therefore been assigned to the oofamily (egg-taxon family) Elongatoolithidae. The eggshells are relatively thin, between 1 and 1.2 mm (0.03 and 0.04 in), and their outer surface is covered by ridges and nodes that rise about 0.3 mm (0.01 in) above the shell. The micro-structure of the eggshells could not be properly studied, as the calcite has been heavily altered and re-crystallized.

The nesting specimen was found in a stratigraphic area indicating that oviraptorids preferred nesting near streams that provided soft, sandy substrate and food in environments that were otherwise xeric (receiving a small amount of moisture). Many oviraptorids have been found in brooding positions, indicating they may have brooded for relatively long periods, similar to modern birds such as the ostrich, emu, and black-breasted buzzard, which brood for more than 40 days with a limited supply of sustenance. Nesting in desert environments can be harmful to adults that stay in the nest for large parts of the day, and for eggs and nestlings, due to heat stress. The choice of nesting area may therefore have been a mechanism for successful incubation in extreme heat.

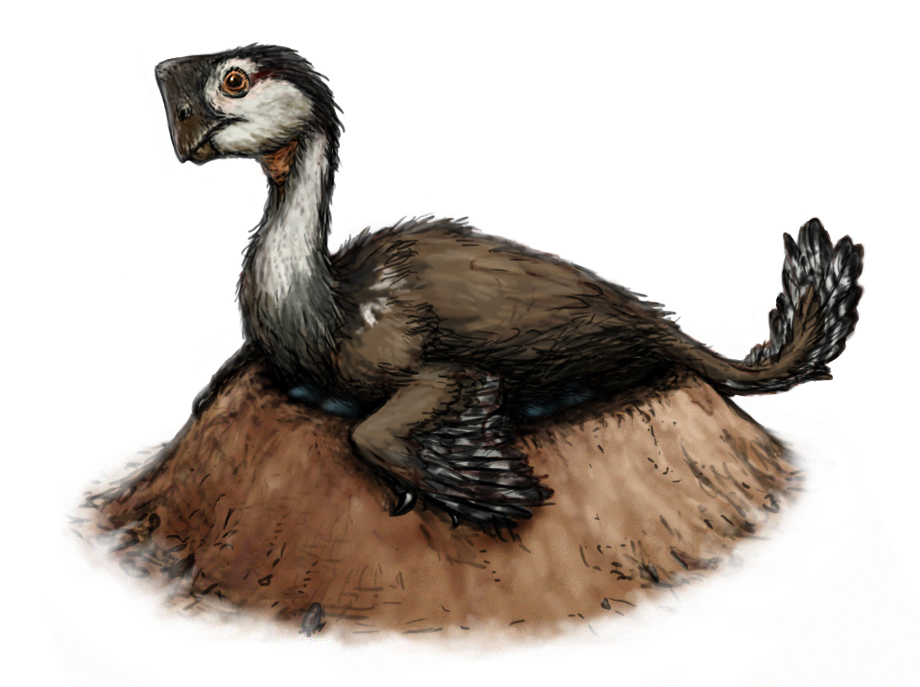
Restoration of a nesting individual

It has also been suggested that the evolution of tail-feathers in oviraptorosaurs was an adaptation for shading and protecting eggs in their nests. That the second finger of heyuannine oviraptorids was reduced in size compared to the robust first finger may be explained by a change in function; it may be related to the presence of long wing feathers that were attached to the second finger. These wing feathers were probably used to protect the eggs during nesting. When the second finger began functioning as a feather support, its ability to grasp was reduced, and this function was taken over by the first finger, which therefore became more robust. The third finger was reduced in size, too, probably because it was positioned behind the wing feathers in a way where it would not be effective for grasping.

In 2018, the palaeontologist Tzu-Ruei Yang and colleagues identified cuticle layers on egg-shells of maniraptoran dinosaurs, including oviraptorids. In modern birds, such layers (which consist mainly of lipids and hydroxyapatite) serve to protect the eggs from dehydration and invasion of microbes. The researchers suggested that the cuticle-coated eggs would have been a trait adapted for enhancing their reproductive success in the variable environments where Nemegtomaia and other oviraptorids nested.

Various studies have suggested that several individuals would gather eggs in a single nest, and arrange them so they could be protected by one individual, possibly a male. In 2010 the palaeontologist David J. Varricchio and colleagues found that the relatively large clutch-size of oviraptorids and troodontids is most similar to those of modern archosaurs (birds and crocodilians, the closest living relatives of dinosaurs) that practice polygamous mating and extensive male parental care (as seen in paleognaths such as ostriches and emus). This reproductive system pre-dates the origin of birds and would therefore be the ancestral condition for modern birds, with biparental care (where both parents participate) being a later development. Many oviraptorosaurs are known to have had pygostyles on the end of their tails, which suggests the presence of feather-fans; the palaeontologist W. Scott Persons and colleagues suggested in 2013 that these could have been used for intraspecific communication such as courtship rituals.

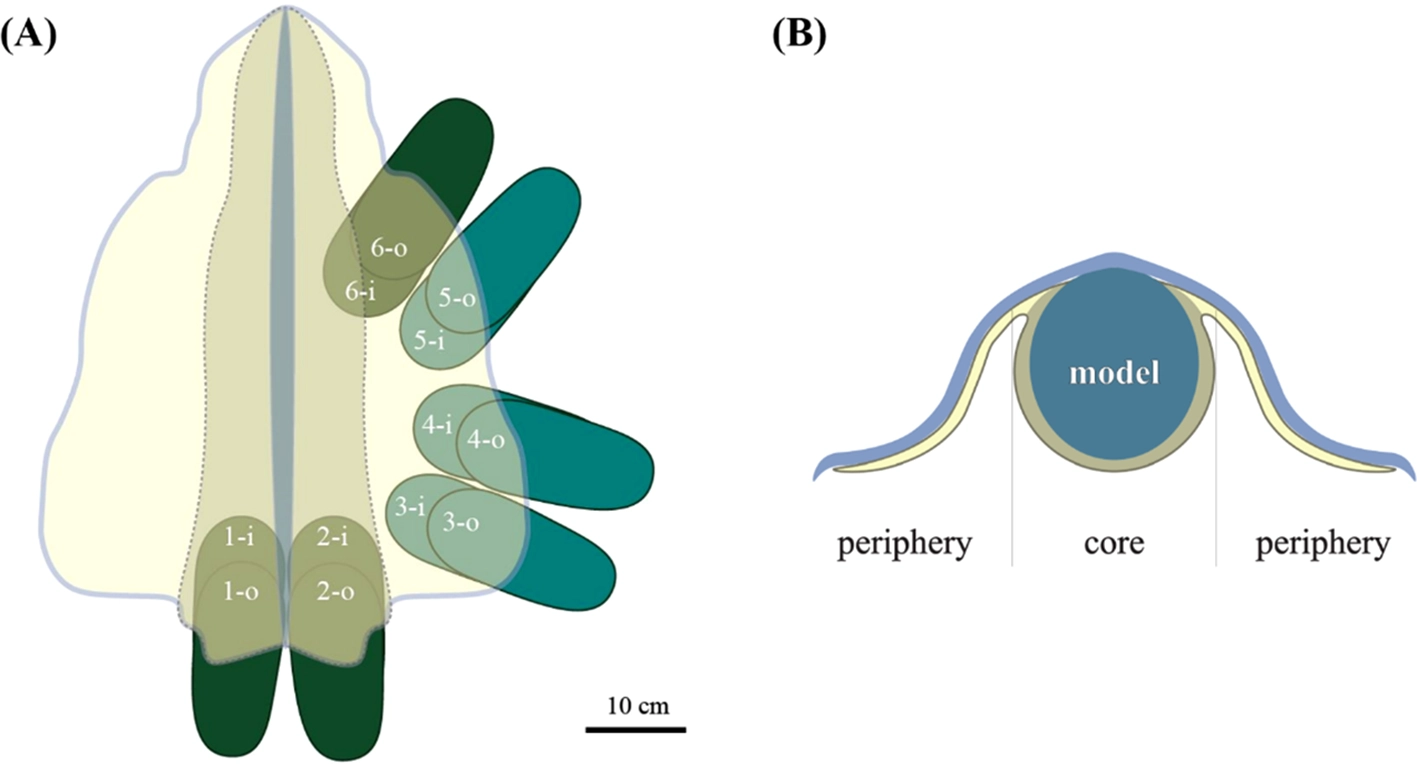
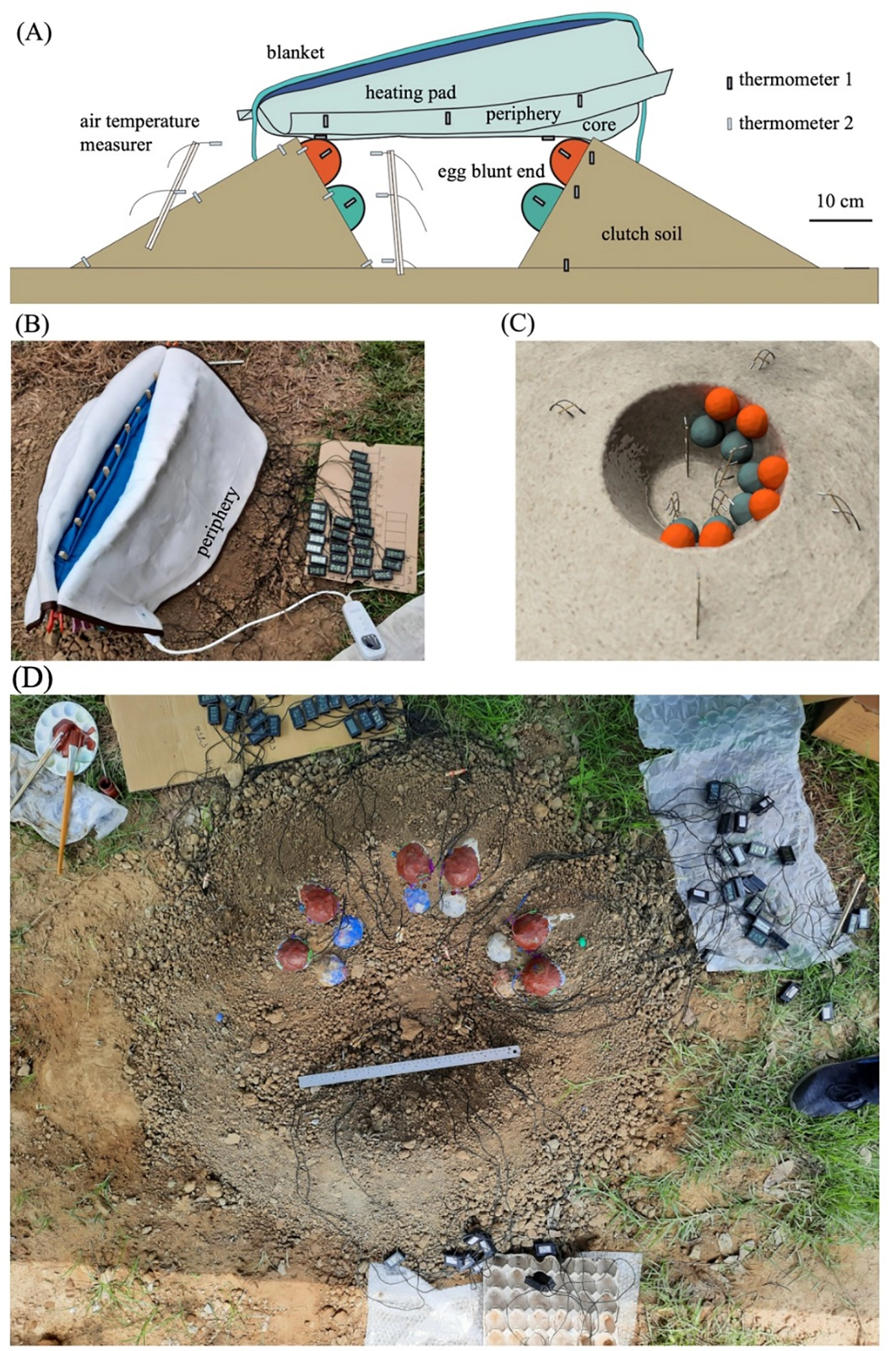
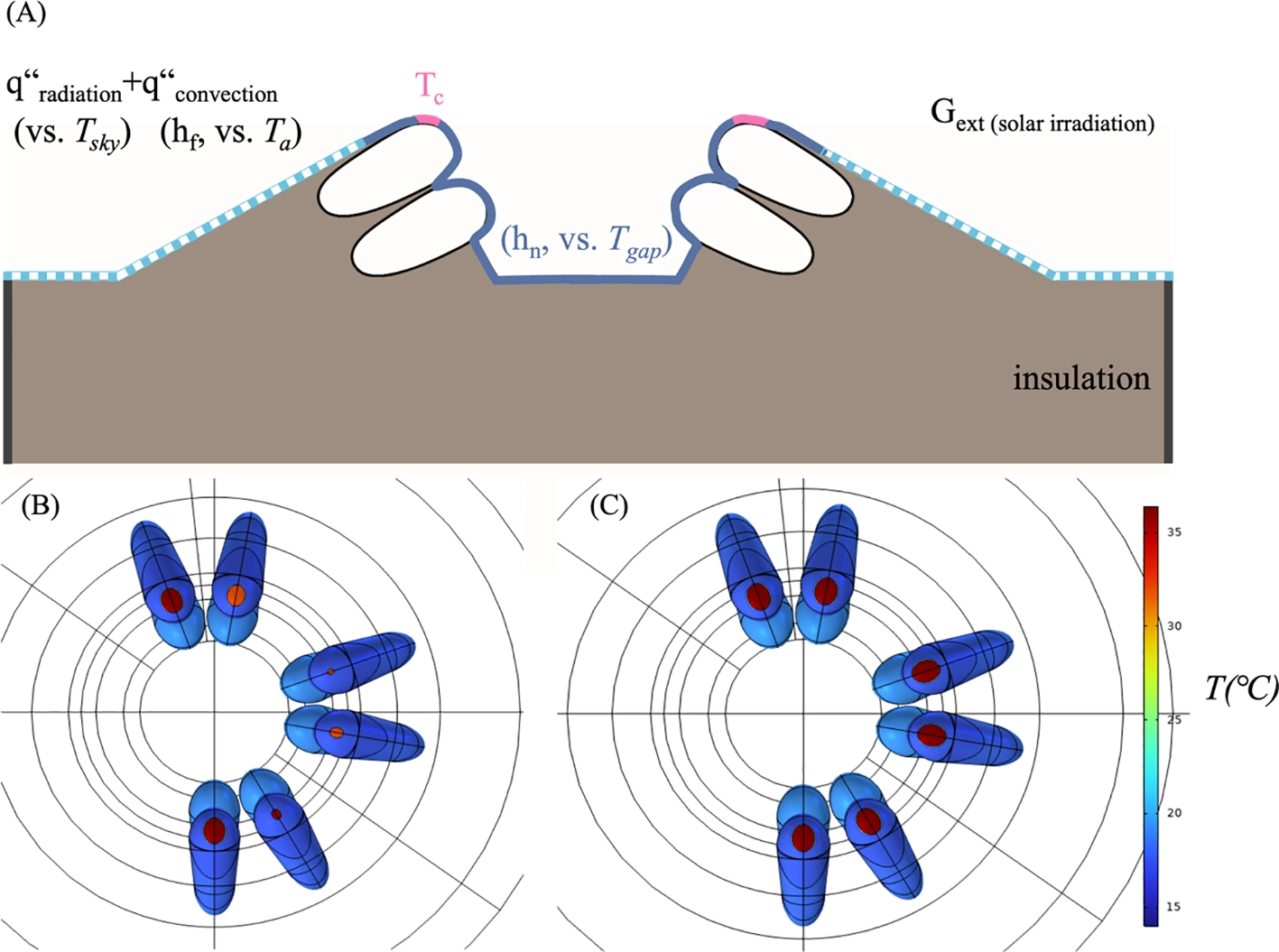
Design and simulations of an incubation experiment to test the brooding behaviour of oviraptorids, based on the proportions of Heyuannia and Nemegtomaia

The palaeontologist Chun-Yu Su and colleagues devised an experiment to evaluate whether oviraptorids employed thermoregulatory contact incubation to provide heat for embryonic development in 2026. They designed an incubator, clutch, and numerical simulations of heat transfer to test the brooding behaviour of the related oviraptorids Heyuannia and Nemegtomaia, based on their body proportions. The results showed that the incubator only partially covered the eggs in the outer ring of the clutch, which led to a difference in temperature between the inner and outer eggs, and therefore lower incubation efficiency than in modern birds. If Nemegtomaia began incubating before clutch completion, the eggs of the outer ring at the core of the incubator would hatch earlier due to the temperature distribution, while those eggs at the inner ring in the periphery would hatch earlier than those in the outer ring above them.

These researchers concluded that their experiment did not support thermoregulatory contact incubation in oviraptorids, instead suggesting they co-regulated their incubation with environmental heat (in conjunction with solar input), where the adult stabilised temperatures of the clutch, reduced thermal extremes, and influenced the pattern of asynchronous hatching, where a cluthc hatches over several days instead of at once. The large difference between incubation temperatures in the two oviraptorids suggests they did not have temperature-dependent sex determination (which is used by for example crocodiles), as the sex-ratios would be skewed.

=== Diet and feeding ===
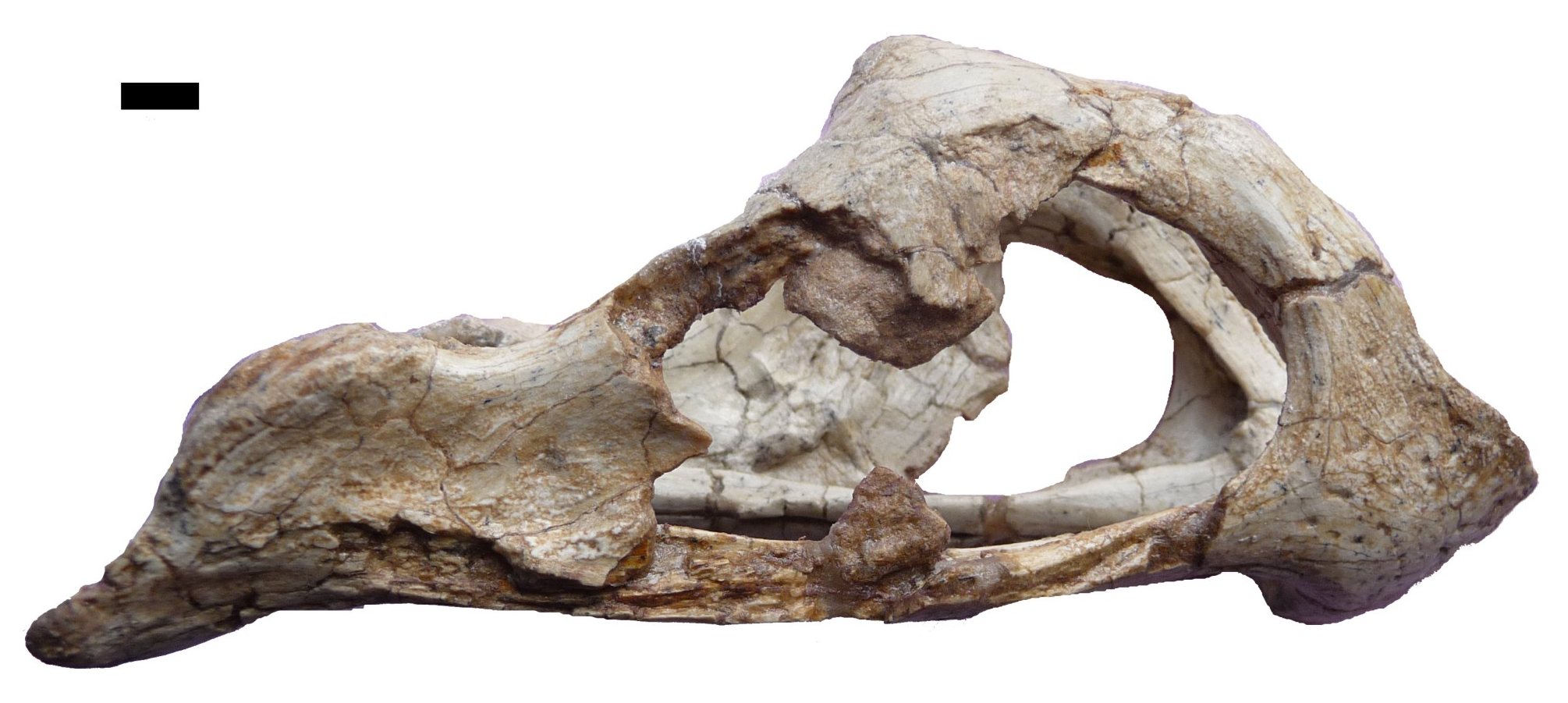
Lower jaw of the holotype specimen, with beak on the right

The diet of oviraptorids has been interpreted in various ways since the time Oviraptor was wrongly thought to have been a predator of eggs. It has been suggested that oviraptorosaurs as a whole were herbivores, which is supported by the gastroliths (stomach stones) found in Caudipteryx, and the wear facets in the teeth of Incisivosaurus. In 2010 Longrich and colleagues found that oviraptorid jaws had features similar to those seen in herbivorous tetrapods (four-limbed animals), especially those of dicynodonts, an extinct group of synapsid stem-mammals. Oviraptorids and dicynodonts share features such as short, deep, and toothless mandibles; elongated dentary symphyses; elongated mandibular fenestrae; and a downwards-projecting bar in the palate. Modern animals with jaws that resemble those of oviraptorids include parrots and tortoises; the latter group also has tooth-like projections on their premaxillae.

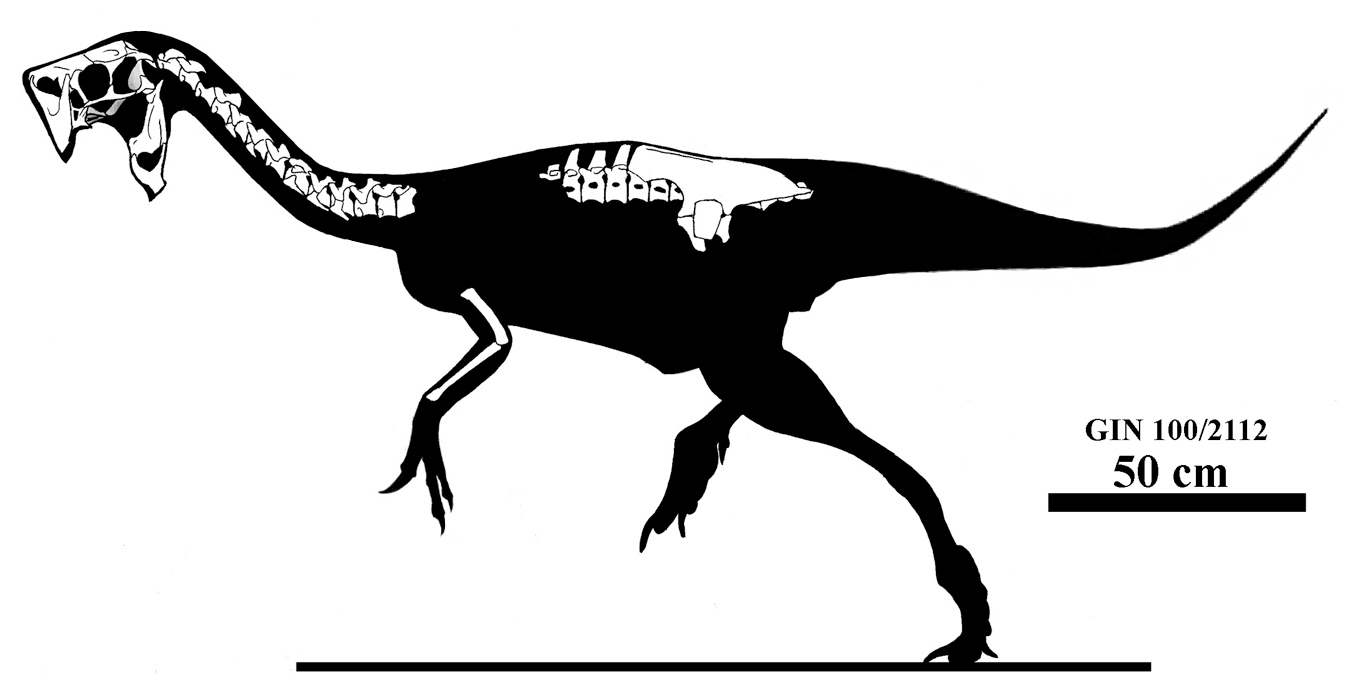
Skeletal diagram of the holotype

Longrich and colleagues concluded that due to the similarities between oviraptorids and herbivorous animals, the bulk of their diet would most likely have been formed by plant matter. Oviraptorids are found at high frequencies in the formations they are known from, similar to the pattern seen in dinosaurs that are known to be herbivorous; these animals were more abundant than carnivorous dinosaurs, as more energy was available at their lower trophic level in the food chain. The jaws of oviraptorids may have been specialised for processing food, such as xerophytic vegetation (adapted for environments with little water), that would have grown in their environment, but this is not possible to demonstrate, as little is known about the flora of the area at the time. A 2013 study by Lü and colleagues found that oviraptorids appear to have retained their hind limb proportions throughout ontogeny (growth), which is also a pattern mainly seen in herbivorous animals. In 2017, the palaeontologist Gregory F. Funston and colleagues suggested that the parrot-like jaws of oviraptorids may indicate a frugivorous diet that incorporated nuts and seeds.

In 1977 Barsbold suggested that oviraptorids fed on molluscs, but Longrich and colleagues rejected the idea that they practised shell-crushing altogether, since such animals tend to have teeth with broad crushing surfaces. Instead, the shape of the dentary bones in the lower jaws of oviraptorids suggests they had a sharp-edged beak used for shearing tough food, not for cracking hard food items such as bivalves or eggs. The symphyseal shelf at the front of the dentary may have given some ability for crushing, but as this was a relatively small area, it was probably not the main function of the jaws. The fact that most oviraptorids have been found in sediments that are interpreted as having been xeric and arid or semi-arid environments also argues against them having been specialised eaters of shellfish and eggs, as it is unlikely there would have been enough of these items under such conditions to support them.

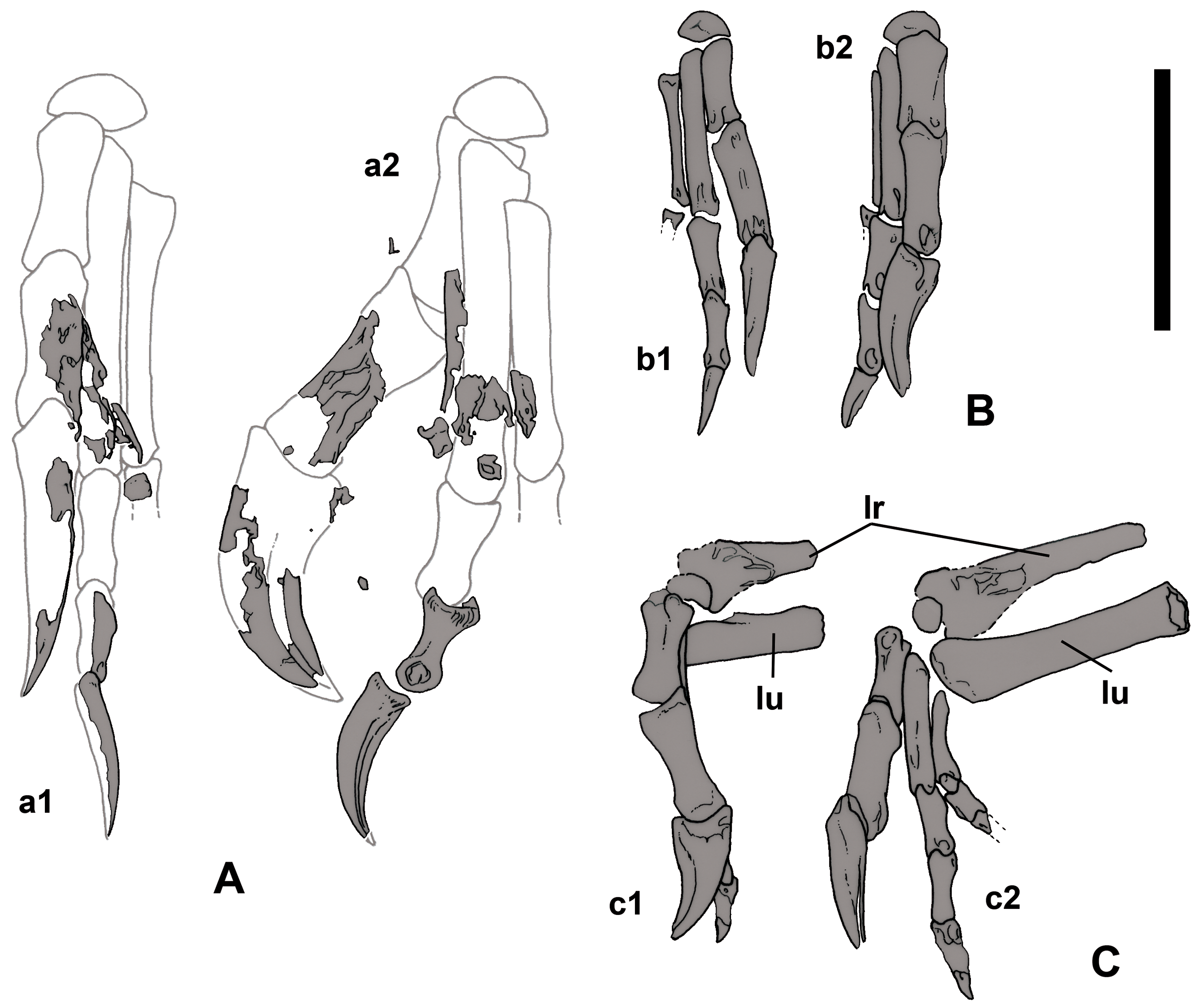
Diagrams showing the hands of specimen MPC-D 107/15 and 107/16

Longrich and colleagues pointed out that the robust forelimbs and enlargement of a single finger in heyuannine oviraptorids is similar to that seen in modern animals that eat ants and termites, such as anteaters and pangolins, but the morphology of heyuannine jaws does not support them being insectivorous. The researchers found that the function of heyuannine forelimbs was unclear, but suggested that they could have been used for scratching, tearing, or digging, though not prey capture.

In 2004 Lü and colleagues proposed that the articulation between the quadrate and quadratojugal bones in the skull of Nemegtomaia suggested that these bones were movable in relation to each other, which would have affected how the jaws functioned. In 2015 the Belgian palaeontologist Christophe Hendrickx and colleagues found it unlikely that Nemegtomaia and other oviraptords had bird-like kinesis in their skulls, due to the quadrate bone being immobile.

== Palaeoenvironment ==
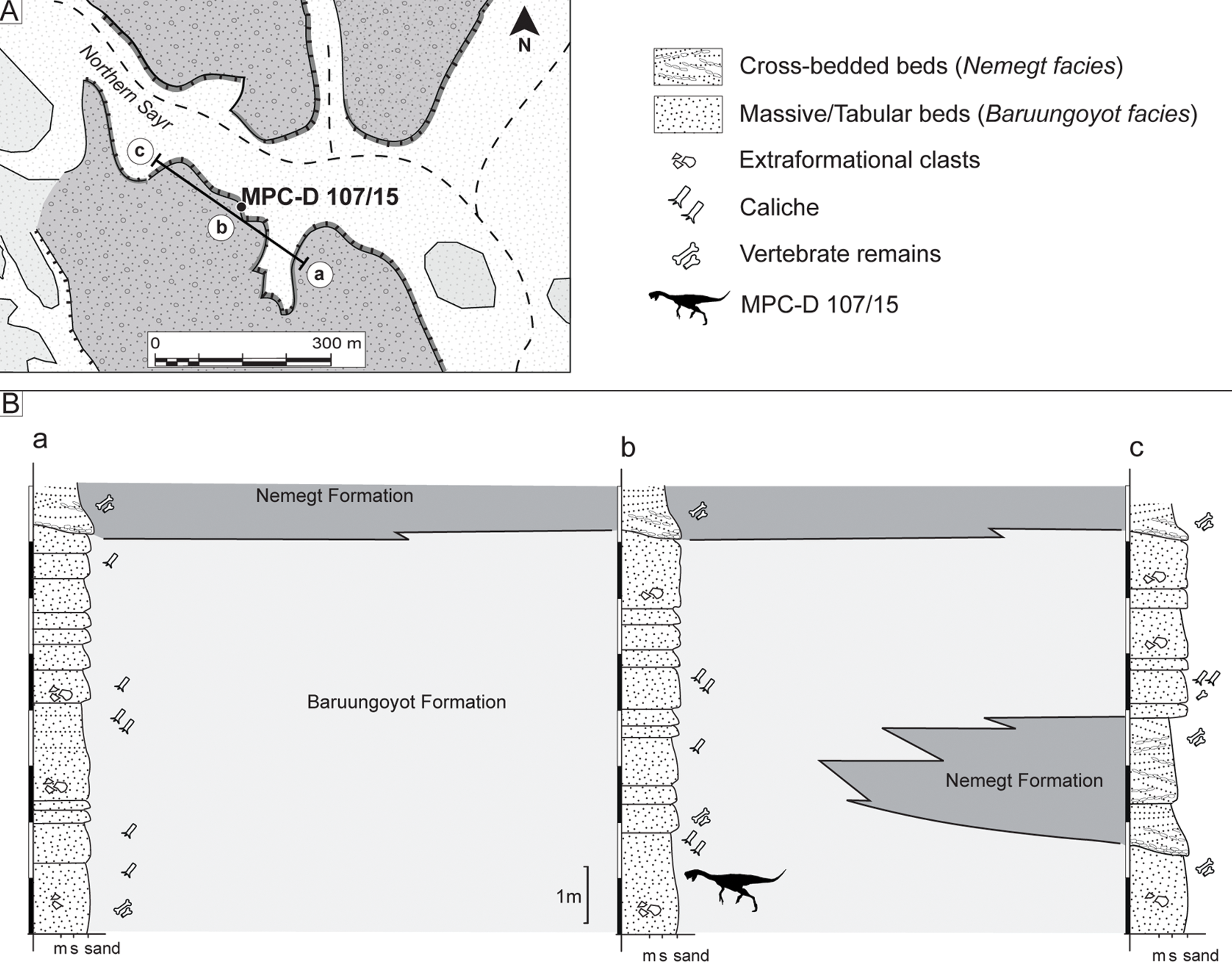
Map and diagram showing the relation between the interfingering Baruungoyot and Nemegt Formations

Nemegtomaia is known from the Nemegt and Baruungoyot Formations, which date to the upper Campanian–lower Maastrichtian ages of the Late Cretaceous period, about 70 million years ago. Though this taxon is known only from the Nemegt locality, unidentified oviraptorid remains from other localities may belong to it. The Nemegt massif has numerous canyons or gorges, up to 45 metres (148 ft) deep, which have some of the best exposures of these formations. The rock facies of the Nemegt Formation are thought to represent a humid, fluvial (associated with rivers and streams) environment, whereas those of the Baruungoyot Formation are thought to represent an arid or semi-arid environment, with aeolian (affected by wind) beds. These two formations with their diverse fossils were historically thought to represent sequential time periods with different environments, but in 2009 the palaeontologist David A. Eberth and colleagues found that there was partial overlap across the transition between them. The two formations "interfinger" across a stratigraphic interval that is about 25 m (82 ft) thick, which suggests that the fluvial and aeolian environments coexisted when the area was sedimented.

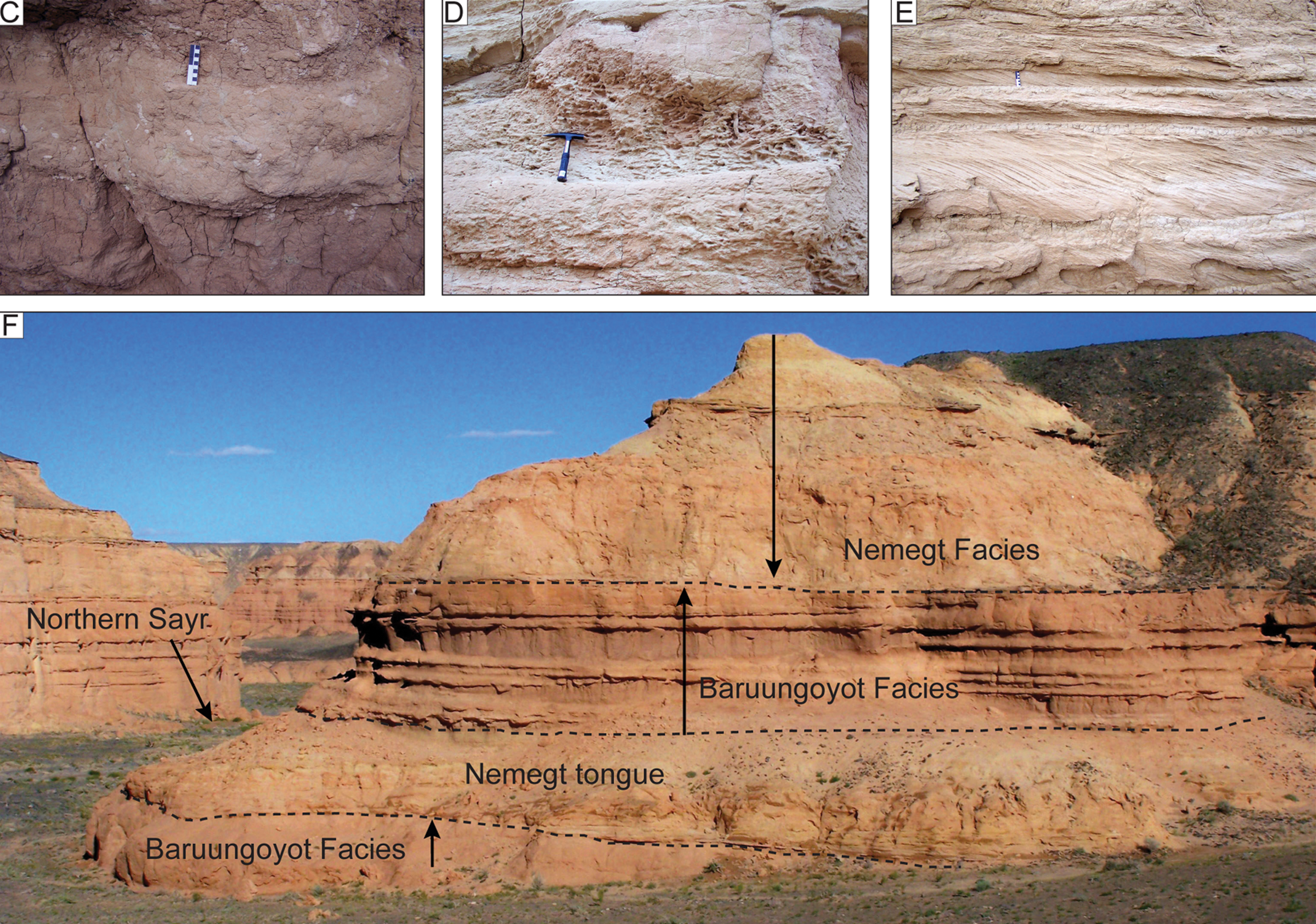
Photos of the interfingering contacts between the formations

The environment of the Nemegt Formation has been compared to the Okavango Delta of present-day Botswana. The habitats in and around the Nemegt rivers provided a home for a wide array of organisms. Aquatic animals include molluscs, fish, turtles, and the crocodylomorph Shamosuchus. Fossils of mammals such as multituberculates have been found, and birds such as Gurilynia, Judinornis, and Teviornis are known. Herbivorous dinosaurs of the Nemegt Formation include ankylosaurids such as Tarchia, the pachycephalosaurian Prenocephale, hadrosaurids such as Saurolophus and Barsboldia, and sauropods such as Nemegtosaurus, and Opisthocoelicaudia. Other theropods include tyrannosauroids such as Tarbosaurus, Alioramus, and Bagaraatan, troodontids such as Borogovia, Tochisaurus, and Saurornithoides, therizinosaurs such as Therizinosaurus, and ornithomimosaurians such as Deinocheirus, Anserimimus, and Gallimimus.

Other oviraptorosaur genera known from the Nemegt Formation include the basal Avimimus, the oviraptorids Rinchenia, Nomingia, Conchoraptor and Ajancingenia, and the caenagnathid Elmisaurus. In spite of the high number of oviraptorid taxa in these formations (the Nemegt has the highest known diversity of them anywhere), none of them were closely related. The Nemegt Formation is unique in having both oviraptorid and caenagnathid oviraptorosaurs, and in 1993 the palaeontologist Phillip J. Currie and colleagues suggested this diversity was due to the two groups preferring different environments in the area. In 2016 the Japanese palaeontologist Takanobu Tsuihiji and colleagues suggested that oviraptorids may have preferred drier environments, while caenagnathids preferred fluvial environments, based on the type of formations they have been found in. Funston and colleagues suggested that oviraptorids were found in both xeric and mesic environments (but were more abundant in the former), whereas the other oviraptorosaur groups avoided the xeric environments, and that the coexistence of the families can be explained by niche partitioning in diet. The environment of the Nemegt Formation may have acted as an oasis and thereby attracted oviraptorids.

=== Taphonomy ===
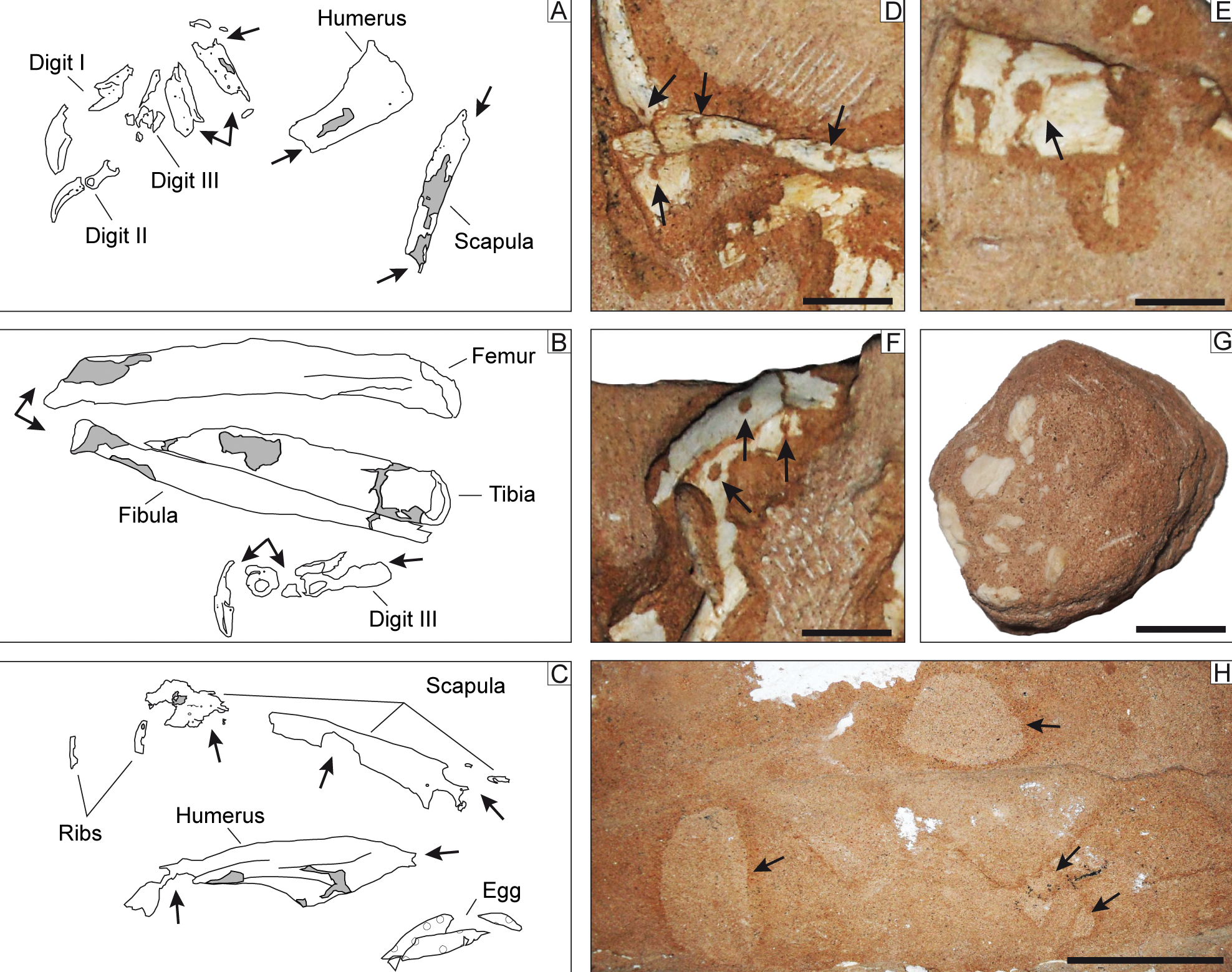
Feeding traces from skin beetles on the nesting specimen

The nesting specimen MPC-D 107/15 has provided much information about the taphonomic processes (changes during decay and fossilisation) in the Baruungoyot Formation. The specimen is preserved in facies that are thought to have been deposited through a sandstorm or dune-shift. It does not seem to have been transported after death, but the body appears to have shifted slightly to the right, indicating the sediment in which it was deposited came towards it from its left side. The neck is curved to the left, the left hand is folded backwards, and the legs are folded into a crouching position. The vertebral column, neck, and hips deteriorated during burial, and much of the damage to the skeleton is thought to have been caused by the activity of invertebrates.

Borings in the bones, burrows, and reworked sediments (perhaps caused by the construction of pupal chambers) in the specimen indicate it was scavenged upon by colonies of skin beetles (Dermestidae) and perhaps other scavenging insects. There are many feeding traces in the joints of the skeleton, and almost all the surfaces where the bones articulated have been obliterated. There are also tunnels in the nest under the neck and skull, and no egg remains have been found in parts with such traces. Modern skin beetles mainly feed on muscle tissue but not on moist materials, and their activity is prevented by rapid burial. It is therefore thought that specimen MPC-D 107/15 was only partially buried at first, with the upper part being exposed enough for a colony of skin beetles to develop. Some damage to the skeleton (especially in the vertebral column) may also have been caused by the scavenging of small mammals.

== See also ==
- Timeline of oviraptorosaur research
