= Nemegt =

Nemegt may refer to:

- Nemegt Basin, a topographical feature in the Gobi Desert region of Mongolia
- Nemegt Formation, a geological rock formation in the Gobi Desert region of Mongolia
