= Valley of the Dragons =

Valley of the Dragons may refer to:

- Nemegt Basin, a geographical area in the northwestern Gobi Desert, known locally as the "Valley of the Dragons"
- Valley of the Dragons (film), a 1961 American science fiction film
