= Nemegtia =

Nemegtia Temporal range: Late Cretaceous, ~70 Ma

Scientific classification
- Kingdom: Animalia
- Phylum: Arthropoda
- Clade: Pancrustacea
- Class: Ostracoda
- Order: Podocopida
- Superfamily: Cypridoidea
- Family: Cyprididae
- Genus: †Nemegtia; Szczechura, 1978

Type species
- †Nemegtia biformata Szczechura & Blaszyk, 1970

Other species
- †Nemegtia obliquecostae Szczechura, 1978; †Nemegtia reticulata Szczechura, 1978

Synonyms
- †Cypridea biformata Szczechura & Blaszyk, 1970

Extinct genus of seed shrimps

Nemegtia is a genus of freshwater ostracods from the Late Cretaceous, known from the Nemegt Formation of Mongolia. The first fossils were collected from this formation by several Polish-Mongolian Palaeontological Expeditions during the years 1963 to 1965, and 1970 to 1971, and later described in 1978 by the Polish paleontologist Janina Szczechura. An earlier description of the 1960s was published in 1970 by Szczechura and colleague Janusz Błaszyk. Among the material, they coined the new ostracod species Cypridea biformata. This new species was re-examined by Szczechura in 1978 and concluded that it represented another species of the new genus Nemegtia, based on the species N. biformata, N. obliquecostae and N. reticulata. The genus is known from hundreds of specimens comprising carapaces and valves of adult to juvenile individuals that have been unearthed from the Altan Uul IV, Bügiin Tsav, Nemegt, Nogon Tsav and Tsagan Khushu localities of the Nemegt Formation.

Nemegtia has been confused with the oviraptorid Nemegtomaia, both from the same formation. This oviraptorid was originally named in 2004 as "Nemegtia", but this was changed to Nemegtomaia in 2005 as the former name was preoccupied by the earlier named Nemegtia.
