= Nemegt Formation =

Geological formation in Mongolia

- Stratigraphic range: Maastrichtian Possibly also late Campanian
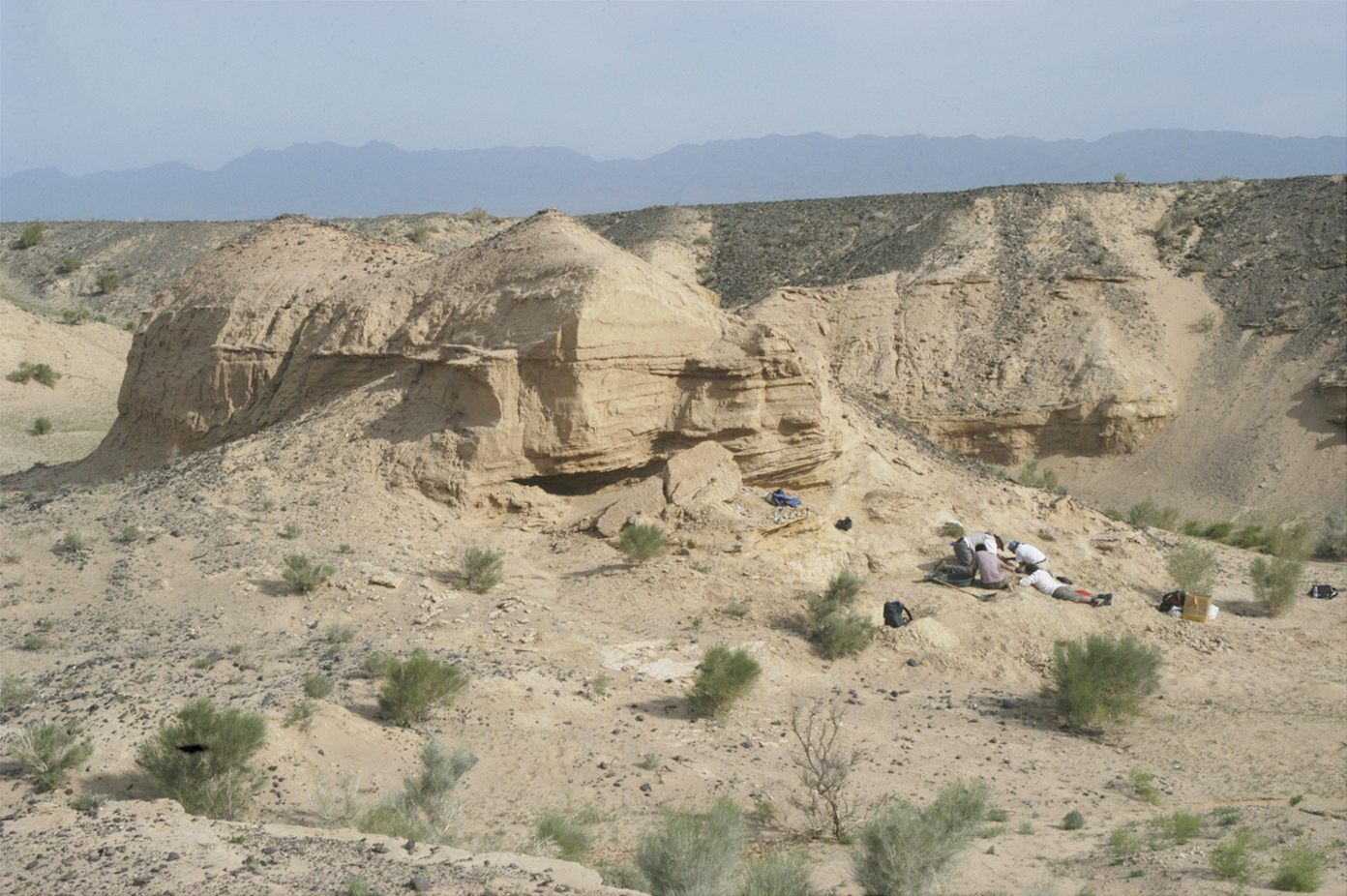
- Nemegt, the type locality of the Nemegt Formation
- Type: Geological formation
- Sub-units: Lower, Middle and Upper units
- Underlies: Alluvium
- Overlies: Baruungoyot Formation
- Thickness: Over 235 m (771 ft)

Lithology
- Primary: Shale, sandstone
- Other: Mudstone, conglomerate

Location
- Coordinates: 43.5°N 101.0°E
- Approximate paleocoordinates: 40.8°N 90.2°E
- Region: Bayankhongor Aimag, Omnogov, Ovorkhangai
- Country: Mongolia
- Extent: Gobi Desert
- Nemegt Formation (Mongolia)

The Nemegt Formation (also known as Nemegtskaya Svita) is a geological formation in the Gobi Desert of Mongolia, dating to the Late Cretaceous. The formation consists of river channel sediments and contains fossils of fish, turtles, crocodilians, and a diverse fauna of dinosaurs, including birds.

== Description ==
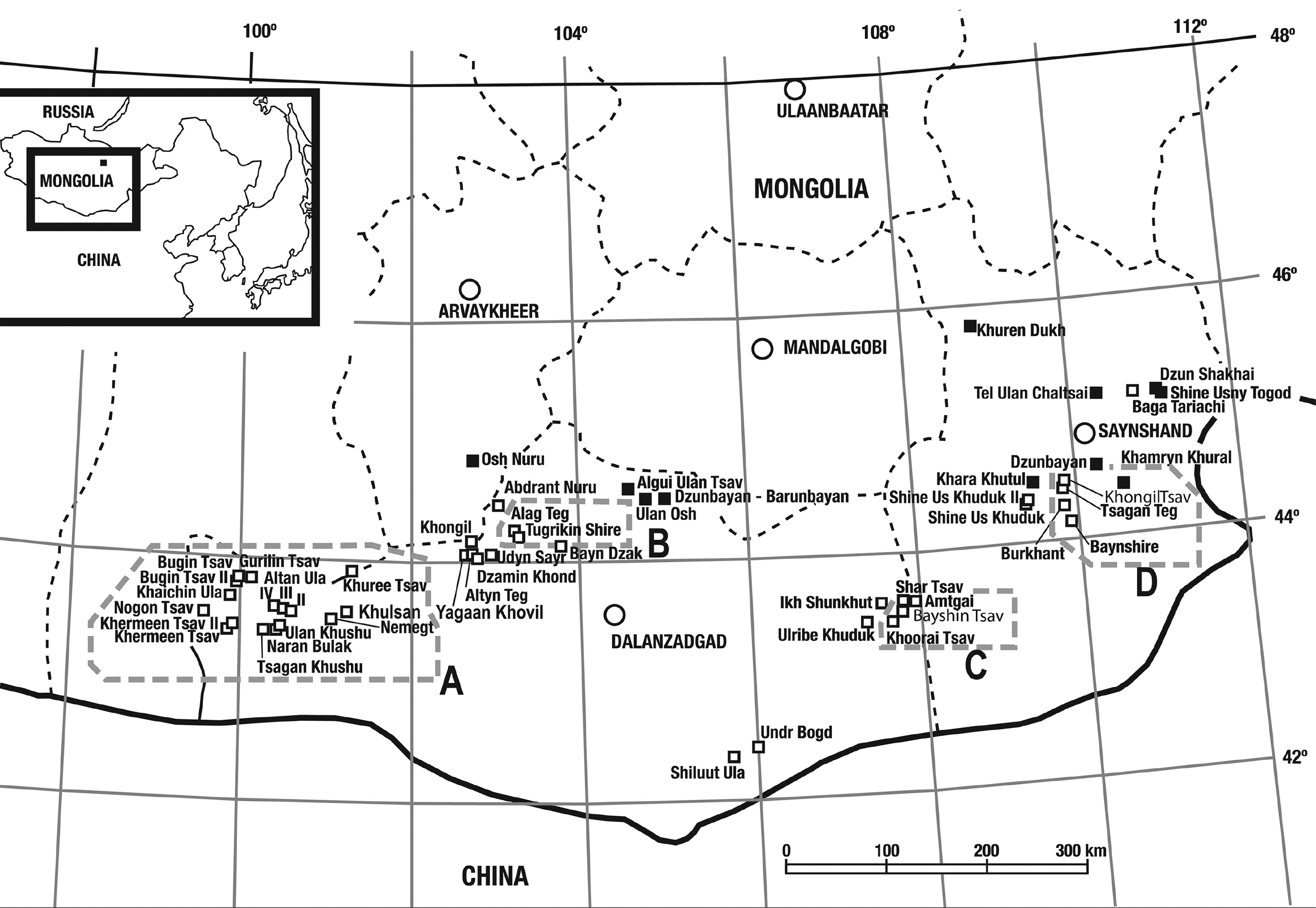
Cretaceous-aged dinosaur fossil localities of Mongolia. Nemegt localities at area A.

The Nemegt Formation is composed of mudstones and sandstones that were deposited by ancient lakes, streams, and flood plains. The Altan Uul locality was described by Michael Novacek as "a canyon carved out of a very rich series of sedimentary rocks" with "steep cliffs and narrow washes". The climate associated with it was wetter than when preceding formations were deposited; there seems to have existed at least some degree of forest cover as indicated by petrified fossil trunks. When examined, the rock facies of the upper section consist of braided meanders, and oxbow lakes. Alteration of sediment grades indicates frequent hydrodynamic condition changes (seasonal rain). Siltstone pellets indicate desiccation at the channel margins in river low-stand periods. Bank erosion features would form through river channel migration. Generally rivers consisted of low flow regimes with sporadic upper flow regimes indicated by exotic pebbles. The lower sections of the formation represent fluvial settings in a seasonally wet and dry climate. The zone of the upper Baruungoyot and lower Nemegt Formations was deposited under a time of increasing wetness. The middle sections of the formation indicate paludal and lacustrine settings deposited under low energy conditions,with an increase in drought conditions as evidence by caliches and evidence of sand dunes being blown in. The upper part of the formation shows a return to fluvial settings and a wetter climate than the rocks below it.A study of oxygen-18 isotopes from theropod teeth show seasonal patterns similar to present day continental climates. Mean annual temperatures are estimated to be around 7.6 °C (45.7 °F) with seasonal precipitation patterns compared to meteorological data from Shijiazhuang, China; suggesting a monsoonal, cold semi-arid climate. That same study indicated that due to the greenhouse conditions of the Cretaceous, the East Asian monsoon was strong enough to reach into Mongolia. The Nemegt environment was dominated by araucarian conifers, but it also supported a diverse array of other plants, including ginkgos and a wide variety of angiosperms—ranging from plane trees (sycamores) to duckweeds. The groundcover included quillwort like plants as well as sedges (members of the group Cyperaceae). Grass is also known from the formation, and as in the Laramie Formation of North America, reed grasses (primarily Phragmites) were present. The area also supported Bald Cypress. The area probably resembled the modern day Okavango Delta in Botswana.

== Stratigraphy ==
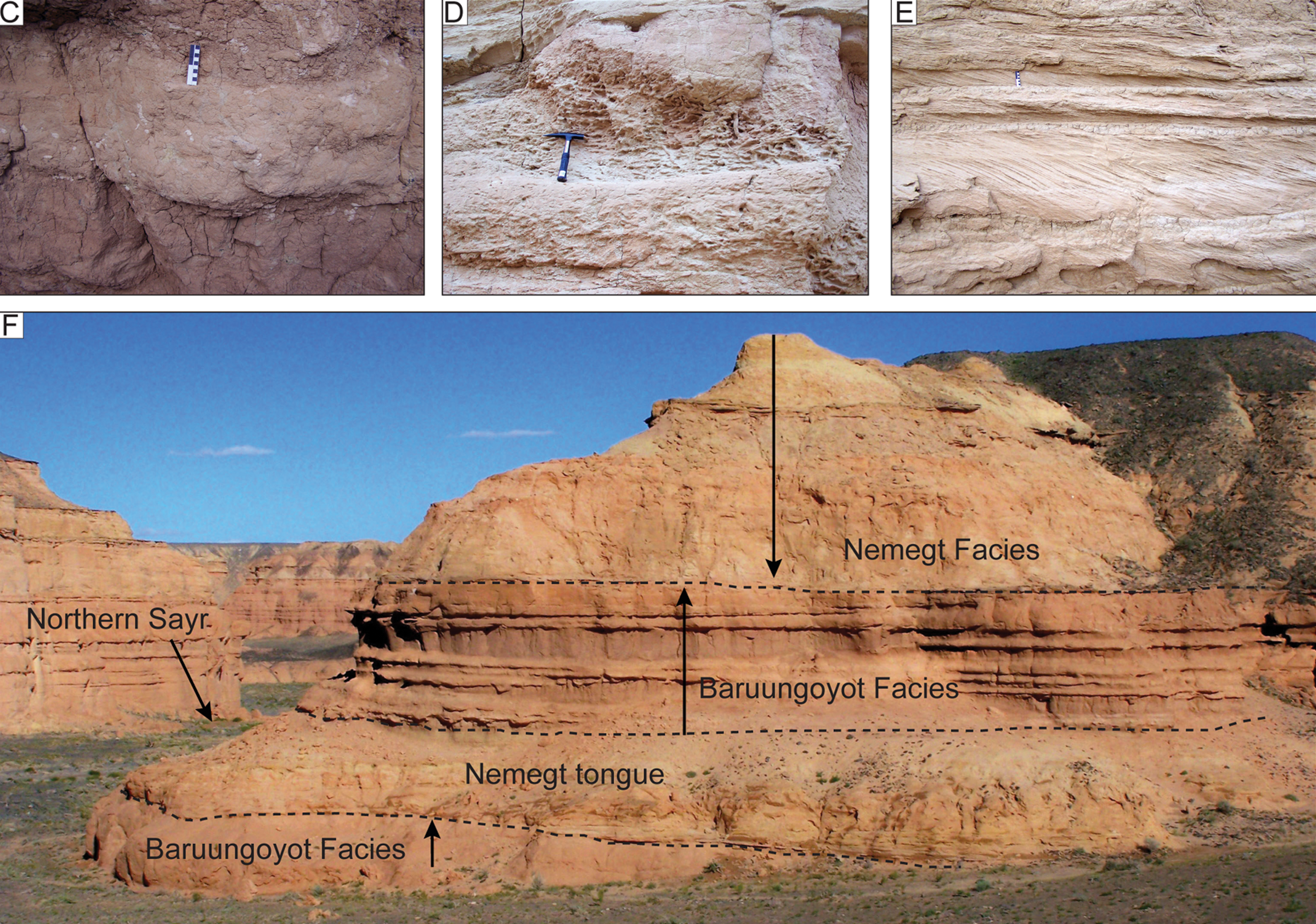
Nemegt and Baruungoyot formations intersection

The most recent stratigraphy divides the Nemegt Formation into three informal members. The lower member is dominated by fluvial deposits, while middle and upper members consist of alluvial plain, paludal, lacustrine, and fluvial deposits. The colour of the sediments is usually light grey to tan in colour in comparison to the typically red colour of the underlying Baruungoyot Formation. It overlies and sometimes interfingers with the Baruungoyot Formation. Interfingering has been noted at the stratotype (Red Walls) and Hermiin Tsav. There has been no absolute dating of the Nemegt Formation. Historically the Nemegt has been considered late Campanian to Maastrichtian, based on comparisons of fossils present, but no exact dating has been performed. U-Pb dating from teeth of Tarbosaurus suggested that the deposition of the middle Nemegt Formation happened before 66.7 ± 2.5 Ma, during the Maastrichtian age, though whether the depositional age of the formation dates back to the late Campanian remains unresolved.

While it has been generally assumed that the Djadochta, Baruungoyot, and Nemegt formations were layered in succession, some geological analysis suggested interfingering rather than superposition of these features. Thus these formations could represent different parts of a single interconnected ecosystem, with the Djadochta reflecting arid dune habitats dominated by small animals, the Baruungoyot representing transitional semi-arid zones, and the Nemegt capturing wetter river plains that supported large dinosaurs.

== Paleobiota of the Nemegt Formation ==
Stratigraphic positions are based on Eberth (2018) who correlated localities to their approximate position within the formation.

Color key: Taxon / Reclassified taxon / Taxon falsely reported as present / Dubious taxon or junior synonym / Ichnotaxon / Ootaxon / Morphotaxon	Notes; Uncertain or tentative taxa are in small text; ~~crossed out~~ taxa are discredited.

=== Flora ===
Genus	Species	Location	Stratigraphic position	Material	Notes	Image
Araucariaceae	Indeterminate	Altan Ula II		"Petrified wood and trunks"	Araucarian conifer, probably the dominant flora of the formation.	
Arundo	A. sp.	Nogon Tsav		"Leaf impressions."	Cane Grass.	
Carpinus	C. altanensis	Atlan Uul		"Fruits."	A Hornbeam birch	
Cyperaceae indet.	Indeterminate	Ulaan Bulag		"Scattered stem and leaf impressions."	A grass-like monocot.	
Ginkgo	G. altanensis	Altan Uul		"Leaf impressions."	Ginkgophyte.	
Ginkgo	G. sp.	Altan Uul		"Leaf impressions."	Ginkgophyte.	
Lemna	L. chushuensis	Tsagan Khushu		"Fruit."	Duckweed.	
Lemnaceae indet.	Indeterminate	Tsagan Khushu, Ulaan Bulag		"Fruits."	Duckweed.	
Monilitheca	M. minuta	Ulaan Bulag		"Two isolated megasporophylls and megaspore casts."	A sporophyll related to quillworts.	
Nelumbo	N. nogontzavensis	Nogon Tsav		"Leaf and fruit impressions."	Water Lotus.	
Nelumbo	N. sp.	Atlan Uul		"Leaf impressions."	Water Lotus.	
Nilssonia	N. sp.	Atlan Uul		"Leaf impressions."	Leaves assigned to Cycadophyta or their own order, Nilssoniales.	
Nyssoidea	N. mongolica	Bugiin Tsav	Middle or Upper	"Fruits."	Likely not in the Nyssaceae family. Also in the Bayanshiree formation.	
Phragmites	P. sp.	Atlan Uul, Nogon Tsav		"Leaf and stem impressions."	Reed Grass.	
Platanus	P. sp.	Altan Uul		"Leaf impressions."	Sycamore.	
Potamogeton-like	Indeterminate	Ulaan Bulag		"Shoots, leaves, and fruits."	Pondweed.	
Silicified Wood	Indeterminate	Altan Uul II, Nemegt		"Petrified wood and trunks."	Indeterminate fossil trees.	
Taxodium	T. sp.	Paleocne border locality, likely Tsagan Khushu		"Leaf impressions."	Cypress.	
Trochodendroides	T. sp.	Altan Uul, and Paleocne border locality, likely Tsagan Khushu		"Leaf impressions."	A Katsura relative.	
Quereuxia	Q. sp.	Atlan Uul, Nogon Tsav"		"Leaf impressions."	A Water caltrop look-alike.	
Zingiberopsis	Z. sp.	Nogon Tsav		"Leaf impressions."	Ginger relative.	

=== Invertebrates ===
Genus	Species	Location	Stratigraphic position	Material	Notes	Image
Altanicypris	A. bispinifera	Altan Uul IV, Nemegt	Lower	"Complete carapace and left valve."	An ostracod.	
Altanicypris	A. multispina	Altan Uul IV, Nemegt	Lower	"Nine carapaces and some detached valves."	An ostracod.	
Altanicypris	A. szczechurae	Altan Uul IV, Nemegt	Lower	"Multiple carapaces and detached valves."	An ostracod.	
Candona	C. altanulaensis	Altan Uul IV, Bügiin Tsav, Nemegt		"Multiple specimens with carapaces and valves."	An ostracod.	
Candona	cf. C. fabaeformis	Altan Uul IV, Nemegt	Lower	"Several carapaces and detached valves."	An ostracod.	
Candoniella	C. altanica	Altan Uul IV, Bügiin Tsav, Nemegt		"Multiple specimens with carapaces and valves."	An ostracod.	
Candoniella	C. mordvilkoi	Altan Uul IV	Lower	"Three adult carapaces."	An ostracod.	
Cyclocypris	C. transitoria	Bügiin Tsav, Nemegt		"Seven adult carapaces."	An ostracod.	
Cypria	C. elata	Bügiin Tsav, Hermiin Tsav		"Several carapaces and valves."	An ostracod.	
Cypridopsis?	C. bugintsavicus	Altan Uul IV, Bügiin Tsav, Nemegt, Tsagan Khushu		"Ten adult carapaces."	An ostracod.	
Cypridopsis?	Indeterminate	Nemegt	Lower	"Several complete carapaces."	An ostracod.	
Cypris?	C. ectypa	Altan Uul IV, Bügiin Tsav, Nemegt, Ulan Bulag		"Complete carapaces and some detached valves."	An ostracod.	
Cypridea	cf. C. punctilataeformis	Nemegt		"One adult carapace."	An ostracod.	
Cypridea	C. barsboldi	Altan Uul IV, Bügiin Tsav, Nemegt		"Multiple specimens with carapaces and valves."	An ostracod.	
Cypridea	C. cavernosa	Altan Uul IV, Bügiin Tsav, Nemegt, Nogon Tsav		"Multiple specimens with carapaces and valves."	An ostracod.	
Cypridea	C. rostrata	Bügiin Tsav, Nemegt, Nogon Tsav		"Caparaces."	An ostracod.	
Cypridea	Indeterminate	Altan Uul IV, Nemegt	Lower	"Five juvenile carapaces."	An ostracod.	
Gobiella	G. prima	Altan Uul IV, Nemegt	Lower	"Several carapaces and detached valves."	An ostracod.	
Khandia	K. stankevitchae	Altan Uul IV, Nemegt	Lower	"Multiple carapaces and valves."	An ostracod.	
Leiria	Indeterminate	Nemegt	Lower	"Several detached valves."	An ostracod.	
Leiria	Indeterminate	Nemegt	Lower	"Complete carapace."	An ostracod.	
Limnocythere sp.	Indeterminate	Nemegt	Lower	"Juvenile carapace."	An ostracod.	
Lycopterocypris?	cf. L. profunda	Altan Uul IV, Nemegt	Lower	"Multiple complete carapaces and left valve."	An ostracod.	
Mongolianella	M. palmosa?	Altan Uul IV, Bügiin Tsav, Nemegt		"Several adult carapaces."	An ostracod.	
Mongolocypris	M. distributa	Altan Uul IV, Bügiin Tsav, Nemegt, Tsagan Khushu		"Multiple specimens with complete carapaces and valves."	An ostracod.	
Nemegtia	N. biformata	Altan Uul IV, Bügiin Tsav, Nemegt, Tsagan Khushu		"Multiple complete carapaces and several detached valves."	An ostracod.	
Nemegtia	N. obliquecostae	Altan Uul IV, Nemegt	Lower	"Multiple carapaces and valves."	An ostracod.	
Nemegtia	N. reticulata	Altan Uul IV, Bügiin Tsav, Nemegt, Nogon Tsav, Tsagan Khushu		"Several carapaces and detached valves."	An ostracod.	
Paracypridea?	P. mongolica	Altan Uul IV, Nemegt	Lower	"Multiple carapaces and detached valves."	An ostracod.	
Rhinocypris sp.	Indeterminate	Nemegt	Lower	"Several carapaces."	An ostracod.	
Scabriculocypris	S. ingenicus?	Altan Uul IV, Bügiin Tsav, Naran Bulag, Nemegt, Tsagan Khushu		"Multiple carapaces and valves."	An ostracod.	
Scabriculocypris	S. rasilis?	Altan Uul IV, Nemegt	Lower	"Several carapaces and detached valves."	An ostracod.	
Timiriasevia	cf. T. miaogouensis	Altan Uul IV, Nemegt	Lower	"Seven valves."	An ostracod.	
Timiriasevia	cf. T. opinabilis	Altan Uul IV	Lower	"Adult carapace."	An ostracod.	
Timiriasevia	T. minuscula	Altan Uul IV, Bügiin Tsav, Nemegt		"Multiple specimens with carapaces and valves."	An ostracod.	
Timiriasevia	T. naranbulakensis	Altan Uul IV, Bügiin Tsav, Nemegt		"Four carapaces and one right valve."	An ostracod.	
Ziziphocypris	Z. costata	Altan Uul IV, Bügiin Tsav, Nemegt		"Fourteen carapaces."	An ostracod.	

=== Fish ===
Genus	Species	Location	Stratigraphic position	Material	Notes	Image
Harenaichthys	H. lui	Altan Uul, Bügiin Tsav, Hermiin Tsav, Ulan Khushu		"Partial skull parts, isolated and articulated centra, and articulated caudal fin."	An osteoglossomorph. Includes previously reported material.	
Osteichthyes indet.	Indeterminate	Bügiin Tsav		"Vertebrae and scales found within a specimen of Deinocheirus''."	A bony fish.	

=== Amphibians ===
Genus	Species	Location	Stratigraphic position	Material	Notes	Image
Altanulia	A. alifanovi	Altan Uul II	Middle or Upper	Partial maxilla	A discoglossid frog. Its classification has been criticized.	
Anura indet.	Indeterminate	Guriliin Tsav		Maxilla fragment	A frog of uncertain affinities. May be attributable to Altanulia.	
Gobiates	G. sp.	Guriliin Tsav		Right frontoparietal and maxilla, left ilium	A gobiatid frog	

=== Mammals ===
Genus	Species	Location	Stratigraphic position	Material	Notes	Image
Buginbaatar	B. transaltaiensis	Bügiin Tsav	Middle or Upper	"Fragmentary skull."	A multituberculate.	
"Gurlin Tsav skull"	Indeterminate		Middle or	Partial skull	A mysterious metatherian, possibly a sparassodont.	
Cimolomyidae indet.	Indeterminate	Guriliin Tsav	Middle to Upper	Humerus	Shares affinities to taxa from the Hell Creek Formation.	

=== Crocodylomorphs ===
Genus	Species	Location	Stratigraphic position	Material	Notes	Image
Paralligator	P. gradilifrons	Nemegt, Nogon Tsav, Ulaan Bulag	Lower	"Partially complete skulls with sparse body elements."	A paralligatorid.	

=== Pterosaurs ===
Genus	Species	Location	Stratigraphic position	Material	Notes	Image
Unnamed azhdarchid	Indeterminate	Guriliin Tsav	Middle or Upper	"Fragmentary cervical vertebrae."	A giant azhdarchid.	

=== Turtles ===
Genus	Species	Location	Stratigraphic position	Material	Notes	Image
Gobiapalone	G. breviplastra	Alak Shand Khuduk, Altan Uul I, Bügiin Tsav, Bügiin Tsav II, Nemegt, Ulan Khushu		"Shell and body elements from multiple specimens."	A trionychid.	
Gravemys	G. barsboldi	Bamba Khuduk, Hermiin Tsav, Ingeni Khobur, Tsagan Khushu		"Partial to complete shells."	A lindholmemydid.	
Nanhsiungchelyidae indet.	Indeterminate	Hermiin Tsav II	Lower	"Shell fragment."	A nanhsiungchelyid.	
Nanhsiungchelyidae indet.	Indeterminate	Khuren Tsav		"Damaged shell."	A nanhsiungchelyid.	
Nanhsiungchelyidae indet.	Indeterminate	Nemegt	Lower	"Partial plastron."	A nanhsiungchelyid.	
Mongolemys	M. elegans	Bügiin Tsav, Hermiin Tsav, Tsagan Khushu		"Skull, shell and body elements from multiple specimens."	A lindholmemydid.	
Mongolochelys	M. efremovi	Altan Uul II, Altan Uul III, Bügiin Tsav, Guriliin Tsav, Hermiin Tsav, Nemegt, Tsagan Khushu		"Skull, shell and body elements from multiple specimens."	A sichuanchelyid.	
Nemegtemys	N. conflata	Bügiin Tsav, Nemegt		"Partial plastron elements."	A trionychid.	
"Trionyx"	"T". gilbentuensis	Gilbentu		"Fragmentary shell."	A trionychid.	
"Trionyx"	"T". gobiensis	Altan Uul III, Bamba Khuduk, Nemegt, Tsagan Khushu		"Fragmentary shell and carapace fragments."	A trionychid.	
Trionychidae indet.	Indeterminate	Bamba Khuduk, Bügiin Tsav, Guriliin Tsav, Ingeni Khobur		"Shell and body remains."	A trionychid. Originally identified as Amyda menneri.	

=== Dinosaurs ===
==== Ornithischians ====
===== Ankylosaurs =====
Genus	Species	Location	Stratigraphic position	Material	Notes	Image
"Dyoplosaurus"	"D". giganteus	Nemegt	Lower	A series of caudal vertebrae, metatarsals, phalanges, osteoderms, and an undescribed partial tail club.	An ankylosaurid now regarded as nomen dubium.	
Tarchia	T. teresae	Altan Uul IV, Hermiin Tsav I	Lower	A skull, mandibles, vertebrae, tail club, and other undescribed postcranial material.	An ankylosaurid.	
Tarchia	T. tumanovae	Hermiin Tsav	Lower	"Partial skeleton with complete skull."	An ankylosaurid.	
Tetrapodosaurus-like indet.	Indeterminate	Bügiin Tsav, Shar Tsav		"Footprint casts."	Ankylosaurid tracks.	
Ankylosauridae indet.	Indeterminate	Altan Uul II-III-IV, Bügiin Tsav, Hermiin Tsav I, Khuree Tsav, Nemegt		A partial dentary, caudal vertebrae, dorsal vertebrae, metatarsals, phalanges, pedal phalanx, humeri, partial pelvis, tail clubs, cervical half-rings, osteoderms, skin impressions, and undescribed juveniles and partial skeletons.	Cranial and postcranial material representing numerous individuals of different ages.	

===== Hadrosaurs =====
Genus	Species	Location	Stratigraphic position	Material	Notes	Image
Amblydactylus-like indet.	Indeterminate	Bügiin Tsav, Bügiin Tsav II, Guriliin Tsav, Yagaan Khovil	Middle & Upper	"Footprint casts."	Three-toed hadrosaurs tracks. Attributed to Saurolophus. Some tracks are huge,those from Guriliin Tsav and Bügiin Tsav up to 1m in length.	
Barsboldia	B. sicinskii	Nemegt	Lower	"Partial vertebrae, pelvis, and ribs."	A hadrosaurid.	
Hadropodus	Indeterminate	Nemegt		"Numerous footprints."	Hadrosaurid tracks. Attributed to Saurolophus.	
Saurolophus	S. angustirostris	Presence in most localities		"Multiple specimens, including articulated skulls, postcranial skeletons and mass death assemblage."	A saurolophine hadrosaurid which was the most common hadrosaur in the area.	
Unnamed ichnotaxon	Indeterminate	Nemegt		"Numerous footprint casts with trackways."	Hand and feet hadrosaur tracks. Attributed to Saurolophus.	

===== Pachycephalosaurs =====
Genus	Species	Location	Stratigraphic position	Material	Notes	Image
Homalocephale	H. calathocercos	Nemegt	Lower	"Partial skull and skeleton including hindlimbs."	A pachycephalosaurid.	
Prenocephale	P. prenes	Guriliin Tsav, Nemegt	Lower; Middle	"Complete skull and partial postcranium of several specimens."	A pachycephalosaurid.	
Prenocephale	P. sp.	Tsagan Khushu, Nemegt	Lower	"complete left squamosal"; large skull	A pachycephalosaurid.	
Prenocephale	Indeterminate	Bugiin Tsav	Middle	"incomplete frontoparietal dome and fragments of associated braincase bones"	A pachycephalosaurid.	

==== Sauropods ====
Genus	Species	Location	Stratigraphic position	Material	Notes	Image
Brontopodus	Indeterminate	Nemegt	Lower	"Large footprint and several four-toed tracks."	Sauropod tracks. Tracks were produced by sauropods larger than any in Nemegt known from skeletal remains. Foot measurements vary from 75-90cm in length. Hip height of track maker estimated as 4m.	
Brontopodus-like indet.	Indeterminate	Bügiin Tsav, Yagaan Khovil	Middle & Upper	"Footprint casts."	Sauropod tracks. Footprints from Bügiin Tsav are enormous, up to 85 cm in length.	
Nemegtosaurus	N. mongoliensis	Nemegt	Lower	"Skulls and body remains from several specimens."	A titanosaur.	
Opisthocoelicaudia	O. skarzynskii	Altan Uul IV	Lower	"Nearly complete skeleton without the skull and cervical series."	A titanosaur.	
Undescribed sauropods	Indeterminate	Altan Uul I-II-II-IV, Bügiin Tsav, Guriliin Tsav, Hermiin Tsav, Khamaryn Khural, Khuree Tsav, Nemegt, Nogon Tsav, Tsagan Khushu, Ulan Khushu		"Several fragmentary remains.	Sauropod remains that may represent already named taxa,such as Nemegtosaurus.	
Unnamed ichnotaxon	Indeterminate	Nemegt		"Footprint casts with skin impressions."	Four-toed sauropod tracks. Attributed to Opisthocoelicaudia.	

==== Theropods ====
===== Alvarezsaurs =====
Genus	Species	Location	Stratigraphic position	Material	Notes	Image
Manipulonyx	M. reshetovi	Hermiin Tsav	Lower	Partial skeleton including several vertebrae, much of the forelimb, and parts of the hindlimb, pectoral girdle, and pelvic girdle	A parvicursorine alvarezsaurid	
Mononykus	M. olecranus	Bügiin Tsav	Middle	"Fragmentary skull, vertebrae, limbs and fragmented pelvis."	An alvarezsaurid	
Mononykus	Indeterminate	Altan Uul III	Lower	"Caudal vertebrae and left hindlimb."	An alvarezsaurid	
Nemegtonykus	N. citus	Altan Uul III	Lower	"Partially complete skeleton from two specimens lacking the skull."	An alvarezsaurid	

===== Birds =====
Genus	Species	Location	Stratigraphic position	Material	Notes	Image
Brodavis	B. mongoliensis	Bügiin Tsav		"Nearly complete left tarsometatarsus."	A hesperornithine.	
Gurilynia	G. nessovi	Guriliin Tsav	Middle	"Left coracoid and partial humerii."	An enantiornithine.	
Judinornis	J. nogontsavensis	Nogon Tsav		"Dorsal vertebra."	A hesperornithine.	
Laevisoolithus	L. sochavai			"Whole egg with partly broken pole"	Laid by a bird or small theropod.	
Subtiliolithus	S. microtuberculatus			"Eggshell fragments"		
Teviornis	T. gobiensis	Guriliin Tsav	Middle	"Partial forelimbs."	A presbyornithid anseriform.	
Unnamed ornithurans	Indeterminate	Tsagan Khushu		"A humerus and two tibiotarsi."	Ornithuran remains.	

===== Dromaeosaurs =====
Genus	Species	Location	Stratigraphic position	Material	Notes	Image
Adasaurus	A. mongoliensis	Bügiin Tsav	Middle	"Partial skull and fragmentary postcrania from two specimens."	A dromaeosaurid.	
Dromaeosauridae indet.	Indeterminate	Bügiin Tsav	Middle	"Cervical vertebra."	A dromaeosaurid.	
Dromaeosauridae indet.	Indeterminate	Hermiin Tsav	Lower	"Dorsal vertebra."	A dromaeosaurid.	
Dromaeosauridae indet.	Indeterminate	Khaichin I		"Three teeth."	A dromaeosaurid.	
Dromaeosauridae indet.	Indeterminate	Nemegt	Lower	"Dorsal vertebra and other elements."	A dromaeosaurid.	
Indeterminate	Indeterminate	Bügiin Tsav		"Footprints with poor claw marks."	Two-toed theropod tracks. Attributed to either Adasaurus or Zanabazar.	
Velociraptor?	V. sp					

===== Ornithomimosaurs =====
Genus	Species	Location	Stratigraphic position	Material	Notes	Image
Anserimimus	A. planinychus	Bügiin Tsav	Middle or Upper	"Partial skeleton lacking the skull."	An ornithomimid.	
Deinocheirus	D. mirificus	Altan Uul III-IV, Bügiin Tsav	Lower; Middle	"Complete skull with virtually complete postcranial remains from three specimens."	A giant deinocheirid.	
Gallimimus	G. bullatus	Presence in most localities		"Multiple specimens with nearly complete skull and postcranial elements."	An ornithomimid.	
Unnamed ornithomimid	Indeterminate	Bügiin Tsav		"Nine trackways including an articulated Gallimimus foot."	Three-toed theropod tracks. Attributed to ornithomimids.	
Unnamed ornithomimid	Indeterminate	Tsagan Khushu		"Partial vertebral column with fore and hindlimbs."	An ornithomimid.	

===== Oviraptorosaurs =====
Genus	Species	Location	Stratigraphic position	Material	Notes	Image
Avimimus	A. portentosus	Shar Tsav Bügiin Tsav	Middle & Upper	"Skull roof with fragmentary body elements."	An avimimid.	
Avimimus	A. nemegtensis	Nemegt	Lower	"Fragmented skull with partial skeleton."	An avimimid.	
Conchoraptor?	C. gracilis?	Guriliin Tsav	Middle	"Skull and a flock of articulated individuals."	An oviraptorid. Also present in the Baruungoyot Formation. Possibly representatives of Conchoraptor.	
Elmisaurus	E. rarus	Altan Uul II, Nemegt	Lower; Middle or Upper	"Fragmentary skull and partially skeletons from several specimens."	A caenagnathid.	
Elongatoolithidae indet.	Indeterminate	Bügiin Tsav		"Three eggs containing embryonic remains."	Oviraptorid eggs.	
Gobiraptor	G. minutus	Altan Uul III	Lower	"Partial crania with complete lower jaws and fragmented postcrania."	An oviraptorid.	
Indeterminate	Indeterminate	Hermiin Tsav, Shar Tsav, Yagaan Khovil		"Footprint casts."	Three-toed theropod tracks. Attributed to Avimimus.	
Nemegtomaia	N. barsboldi	Nemegt	Lower	"Multiple specimens including a nesting specimen and eggs."	An oviraptorid also present in the Baruungoyot Formation.	
Nomingia	N. gobiensis	Bügiin Tsav, Nemegt	Lower; Middle	"Vertebral series with partial hindlimbs and a referred pygostyle."	A caenagnathid. May be synonymous with Elmisaurus.	
Oksoko	O. avarsan	Bügiin Tsav, Guriliin Tsav	Middle	"Multiple associated skeletons."	An oviraptorid.	
Rinchenia	R. mongoliensis	Altan Uul II	Middle or Upper	"Skull with nearly complete skeleton."	An oviraptorid.	

===== Therizinosaurs =====
Genus	Species	Location	Stratigraphic position	Material	Notes	Image
Therizinosaurus	T. cheloniformis	Altan Uul II, Hermiin Tsav, Nemegt	Lower & Middle	"Fore and hindlimb elements from multiple specimens."	A giant therizinosaurid.	
Undescribed therizinosaurids	Indeterminate	Altan Uul IV, Bügiin Tsav, Tsagan Khushu	Lower Middle & Upper	"Partial remains."	Therizinosaurid remains. Possibly Therizinosaurus.	

===== Troodontids =====
Genus	Species	Location	Stratigraphic position	Material	Notes	Image
Borogovia	B. gracilicrus	Altan Uul IV	Lower	"Partial hindlimbs."	A troodontid.	
Indeterminate	Indeterminate	Bügiin Tsav		"Footprints with poor claw marks."	Two-toed theropod tracks. Attributed to either Adasaurus or Zanabazar.	
Tochisaurus	T. nemegtensis	Nemegt	Lower	"Left metatarsus."	A troodontid.	
Zanabazar	Z. junior	Bügiin Tsav	Middle	"Skull with fragmentary postcranial skeleton."	A troodontid originally identified as "Saurornithoides junior".	

===== Tyrannosaurs =====
Genus	Species	Location	Stratigraphic position	Material	Notes	Image
Alioramus	A. remotus	Nogon Tsav		"Partially preserved skull with very sparse postcranial remains."	An alioramin.	
Alioramus	A. altai	Tsagan Khushu		"Nearly complete skull with partial postcrania."	An alioramin.	
Bagaraatan	B. ostromi	Nemegt	Lower	"Fragmentary lower jaw, hindlimb and caudal vertebrae."	A tyrannosauroid.	
Indeterminate	Indeterminate	Bügiin Tsav, Bügiin Tsav II		"Footprint casts."	Three-toed theropod tracks. Attributed to Tarbosaurus.	
Raptorex	R. kriegsteni			"Nearly complete skeleton including the skull."	A controversial genus of tyrannosaurid that could be a juvenile Tarbosaurus.	
Tarbosaurus	T. bataar	Presence in most localities		"Nearly complete skeletons from multiple specimens."	A large tyrannosaurid which was the most common large carnivore in the area.	
Unnamed ichnotaxon	Indeterminate	Nemegt		"Footprint casts with skin impressions."	Three-toed theropod tracks. Attributed to Tarbosaurus.	
Tyrannosauripodidae indet.	Indeterminate	Nemegt		"Five tracks."	Three-toed tyrannosaurid tracks. Attributed to either Alioramus or Tarbosaurus.	

== See also ==
- Djadochta Formation
- List of dinosaur-bearing rock formations
- List of fossil sites
- Nemegt Basin
