= Judinornis =

Judinornis Temporal range: Late Cretaceous, 70 Ma

Scientific classification
- Domain: Eukaryota
- Kingdom: Animalia
- Phylum: Chordata
- Clade: Dinosauria
- Clade: Saurischia
- Clade: Theropoda
- Clade: Avialae
- Clade: †Hesperornithes
- Genus: †Judinornis; Nessov & Borkin, 1983
- Species: †J. nogontsavensis

Binomial name
- †Judinornis nogontsavensis Nessov & Borkin, 1983

Extinct genus of birds

Judinornis is a genus of prehistoric flightless birds from the late Cretaceous period. The single known species is Judinornis nogontsavensis. Its fossils have been found in Nemegt Formation rocks of southern Mongolia, and though the age of these deposits is not fully resolved, Judinornis probably lived some 70 million years ago during the early Maastrichtian.

The Nemegt Formation does not seem to contain marine sediments. Consequently, and unlike its relatives, this was apparently a bird of estuaries and rivers running from the mountains thrown up by the Cimmerian orogeny through the arid lands of continental East Asia towards the Turgai Sea and the former Shigatze Ocean.

Judinornis was a member of the Hesperornithes, flightless toothed seabirds of the Cretaceous. Though its relationships to other members of this group are inadequately known, it appears to have been one of the more basal hesperornithines.

== Sources ==
- Mortimer, Michael (2004). "The Theropod Database: Phylogeny of taxa". Archived from the original on 2013-05-16. Retrieved 2 March 2012
