= Gurilynia =

Gurilynia Temporal range: Late Cretaceous, 70–66 Ma

Scientific classification
- Kingdom: Animalia
- Phylum: Chordata
- Class: Reptilia
- Clade: Dinosauria
- Clade: Saurischia
- Clade: Theropoda
- Clade: Avialae
- Clade: †Enantiornithes
- Genus: †Gurilynia; Kurochkin, 1999
- Species: †G. nessovi

Binomial name
- †Gurilynia nessovi Kurochkin, 1999

Genus of birds

Gurilynia is a genus of enantiornithine birds. One species is known, G. nessovi. It lived during the Maastrichtian stage of the Late Cretaceous period, between 70 and 66 mya. Gurilynia is known from fragmentary fossils found at the Gurilyn Tsav locality of the Nemegt Formation in south Gobi, Mongolia.

== Description ==
The fossil material includes three partial bones. The holotype is the proximal end of a right humerus, catalog number PIN 4499-12. This specimen indicates the largest Mongolian Mesozoic bird, with a length of 53 cm (21 in), hip height of 23.2 cm (9.1 in), and weight of 2.1 kg (4.6 lb). A paratype is the distal end of a left humerus, catalog number PIN 4499-14. The last paratype is the shoulder end of a left coracoid, catalog number PIN 4499-13. All three fossils are in the collection of the Paleontological Institute of the Russian Academy of Sciences. The material is depicted in the journal with both photographs and illustrations. The humeral head is around 29 mm (1.1 in) wide. The largest enantiornithine from the Early Cretaceous is Pengornis, with a humeral head width of 17 mm (0.67 in).

Kurochkin also mentions that "The additional distal portions of the ulna, radius, and carpometacarpus from the same beds also very probably belong to the Enantiornithes." This passage may describe PIN 4499-1, which was later assigned to Teviornis. Kurochkin also adds that G. nessovi demonstrates that there were large Enantiornithids in Central Asia as well as the Americas at the end of the Cretaceous.
