= Nemegt Basin =

Geographical area in the northwestern Gobi Desert

Nemegt Basin Valley of the Dragons
- Basin
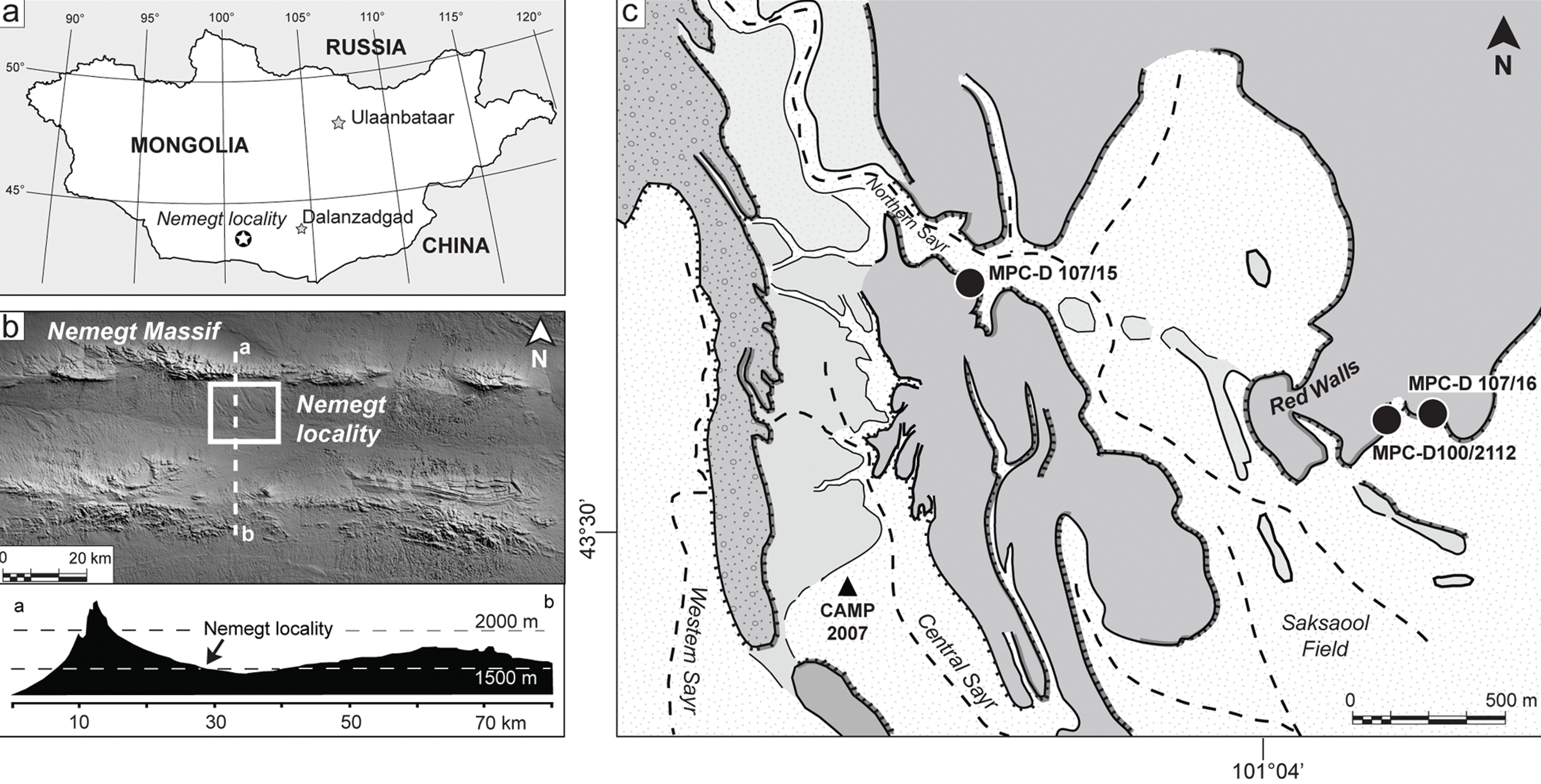
- A: Location of Nemegt Basin in southern Mongolia; B: Nemegt Basin is located a few kilometers south of the massif of the same name; C: detail of the Nemegt locality

- Coordinates: 43°30′N 101°00′E

The Nemegt Basin is a geographical area in the northwestern Gobi Desert, in Ömnögovi Province, southern Mongolia. It is known locally as the "Valley of the Dragons", since it is a source of many fossil finds, including dinosaurs, dinosaur eggs, and trace fossils.

== Geology ==
The main geological formations in the area are the Nemegt Formation, Barun Goyot Formation, and Djadochta Formation, in order of age, from youngest (most superficial) to oldest (deepest).
