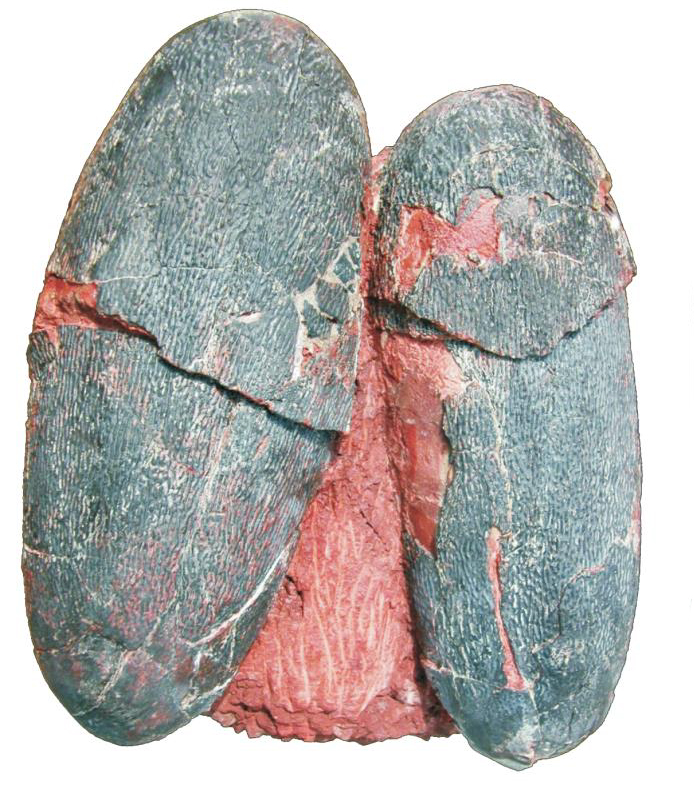
- A pair of Macroolithus yaotunensis eggs

Egg fossil classification
- Basic shell type: Ornithoid
- Morphotype: Ornithoid-ratite
- Oofamily: †Elongatoolithidae
- Oogenus: †Macroolithus; Zhao, 1975

Type oospecies
- †Oolithes rugustus Young, 1965

Oospecies
- M. rugustus (Young, 1965); M. yaotunensis Zhao, 1975; M. mutabilis Mikhailov, 1994; M. lashuyuanensis Fang et al., 2009

= Macroolithus =

Macroolithus Temporal range: Late Cretaceous

Oogenus of dinosaur egg

Macroolithus is an oogenus (fossil-egg genus) of dinosaur egg belonging to the oofamily Elongatoolithidae. The type oospecies, M. rugustus, was originally described under the now-defunct oogenus name Oolithes. Three other oospecies are known: M. yaotunensis, M. mutabilis, and M. lashuyuanensis. They are relatively large, elongated eggs with a two-layered eggshell. Their nests consist of large, concentric rings of paired eggs. There is evidence of blue-green pigmentation in its shell, which may have helped camouflage the nests.

Macroolithus eggs have been found containing oviraptorid dinosaur embryos resembling Heyuannia. Multiple other associations between oviraptorid and elongatoolithids (including other eggs containing embryos, parents brooding on nests, and a pair of shelled Macroolithus-like eggs preserved within an oviraptorid's pelvis) confirm that the parent of Macroolithus was an oviraptorid.

It is found in Upper Cretaceous formations of central and eastern Asia; fossils have been found in Mongolia, Kazakhstan and China. In the Nanxiong formation in Southern China, Macroolithus fossils range up to and possibly over the Cretaceous-Tertiary boundary, which is traditionally assumed to mark the extinction of the non-avian dinosaurs. Some paleontologists have interpreted the record of dinosaur eggs at this formation as supporting a gradual extinction event, rather than a sudden cataclysmic event. However, other paleontologists believe that these interpretations are merely based on artifacts of erosion and redeposition in the early Paleogene.

== Description ==
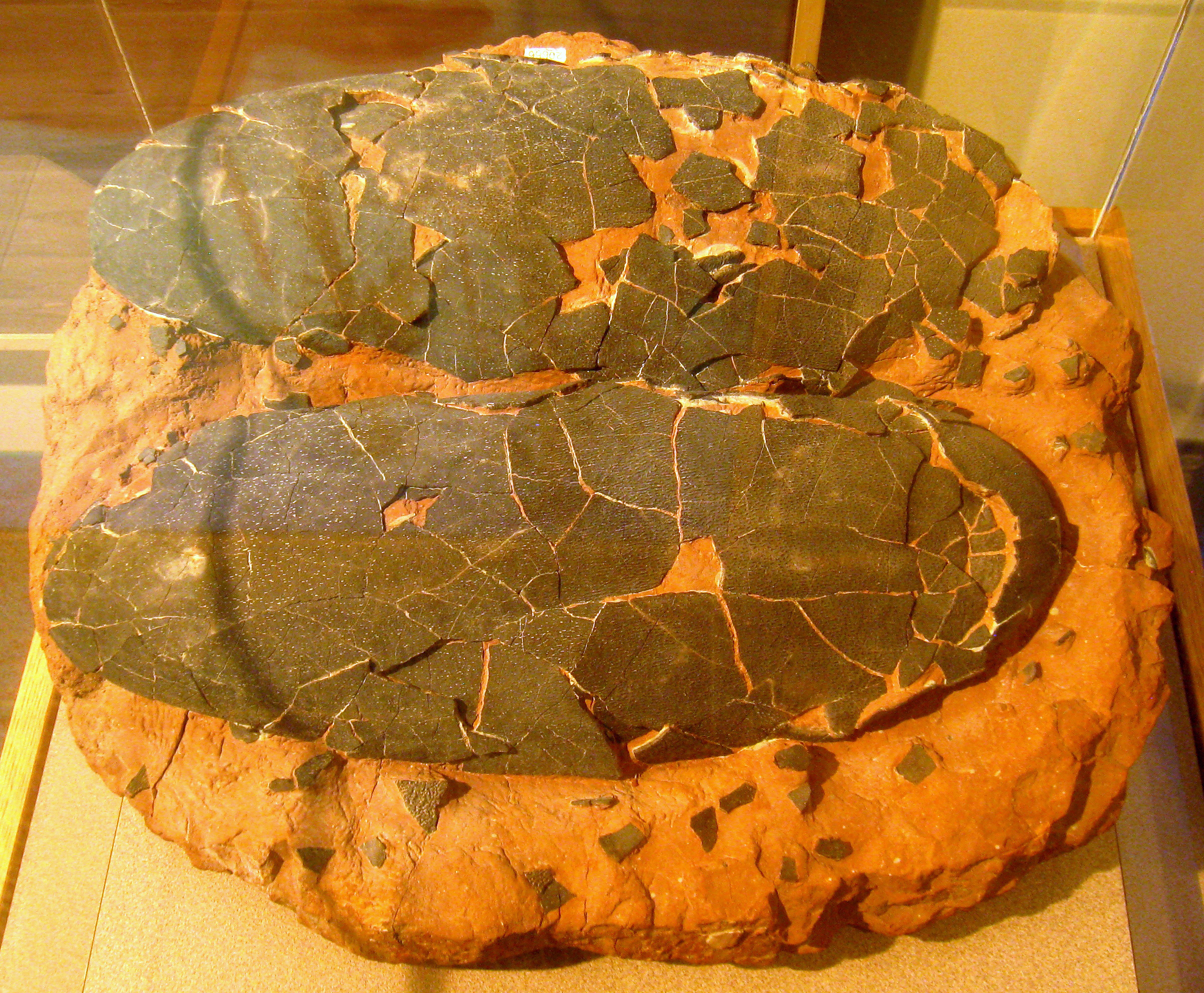
A pair of Macroolithus eggs

Macroolithus eggs are characterized by large size, measuring 16 to 21 cm (6.3 to 8.3 in) long, and by their particularly coarse ornamentation. Their microstructure is not well defined in the literature, but generally follows the typical elongatoolithid pattern: The eggshell is arranged into two structural layers (the mammillary layer and the continuous layer). The continuous layer forms the outer part of the eggshell; its eggshell units are fused together so that the layer appears to be a continuum. The inner layer, known as the mammillary, or cone, layer is made up of cone-shaped structures that form the base of the eggshell units. In Macroolithus, the continuous layer is two to three times thicker than the mammillary layer. The eggs have great diversity of pore structure. Since gas conductance is related to the pore size and density this could imply that the eggs were laid in variable environments.

=== Oospecies ===
Four oospecies of Macroolithus are currently recognized:

- M. rugustus – the type oospecies, these eggs are found in Nanxiong and Jiangxi in south China; it is also common in the Nemegt Formation of Mongolia and the Manrakskaya Svita in Kazakhstan. It ranges in size from 16.5 to 18 cm (6.5 to 7.1 in) long by 7.5 to 8.5 cm (3.0 to 3.3 in) across. Its eggshell is 0.8 to 1.7 mm (0.031 to 0.067 in) thick, about 1/4 of which is the mammillary layer. The outer surface is covered with irregular chains of nodes (ramotuberculate ornamentation) around the outer center of the egg, transitioning to a more pitted, netlike pattern (sagenotuberculate) at the ends.
- M. yaotunensis is native to Henan and to Nanxiong. It has similar microstructure and ornamentation to M. rugustus, but can be distinguished by being slightly larger (17.5 to 21 cm (6.9 to 8.3 in) long) and having a thicker shell (1.4 to 1.9 mm (0.055 to 0.075 in)). Also unlike M. rugustus, M. yaotunensis shows a wavy boundary between its mammillary layer and its continuous layer.

Size of two Macroolithus oospecies

- M. mutabilis – this Mongolian oospecies is known from several eggshell fragments. The fragments range from 1.3 to 2.0 mm (0.051 to 0.079 in) thick, slightly thicker than M. rugustus. When complete, the egg probably measured over 17 cm (6.7 in). It is unique for what Mikhailov called "aberrational" features: several fragments have slit-like pore canals and lack ornamentation.
- M. lashuyuanensis – this oospecies is based on an eggshell fragment found in the Nanxiong Basin of Guangdong. With a thickness of 2.3 to 2.7 mm (0.091 to 0.106 in), its eggshell is the thickest among Macroolithus oospecies. It is furthermore distinguished by having a dark, dense band near the top of its continuous layer and a gradual transition between the continuous and mammillary layers.

=== Coloration ===
Some specimens of M. yaotunensis preserve traces of the reddish brown pigment protoporphyrin and the blue-green pigment biliverdin, the same pigments used in the eggs of many modern birds. The eggs were most likely an intense blue-green color, as shown by the predominance of biliverdin in the shell. The purpose of the coloration is uncertain, but in modern birds it can serve as camouflage or as a post-mating sexual signal. Colored eggs are also correlated with active paternal care in modern birds, lending further support to the hypothesis that oviraptorid males cared for their eggs.

== Names and etymology ==
The name Macroolithus is derived from the Greek roots macro- (meaning "large") and oolithus (meaning "stone egg"), the conventional suffix for oogenus names. Its Chinese name (巨形蛋 Jùxíng dàn) similarly translates to "giant egg". The oospecific epiphets yaotunensis (Chinese: 窑屯 yáotún) and lashuyuanensis (Chinese: 腊树园 Làshùyuán) honor the localities where those oospecies were originally discovered (the Yaotun and Lashuyuan districts of Guangdong, respectively), affixing the Latin suffix -ensis to denote the place of origin; the name mutabilis is Latin for changeable. When he named "Oolithes" rugustus, Yang (1965) did not give the etymology of rugustus, but the Chinese form (粗皮 cūpí) translates to "rough skin".

== Paleobiology and parenting ==
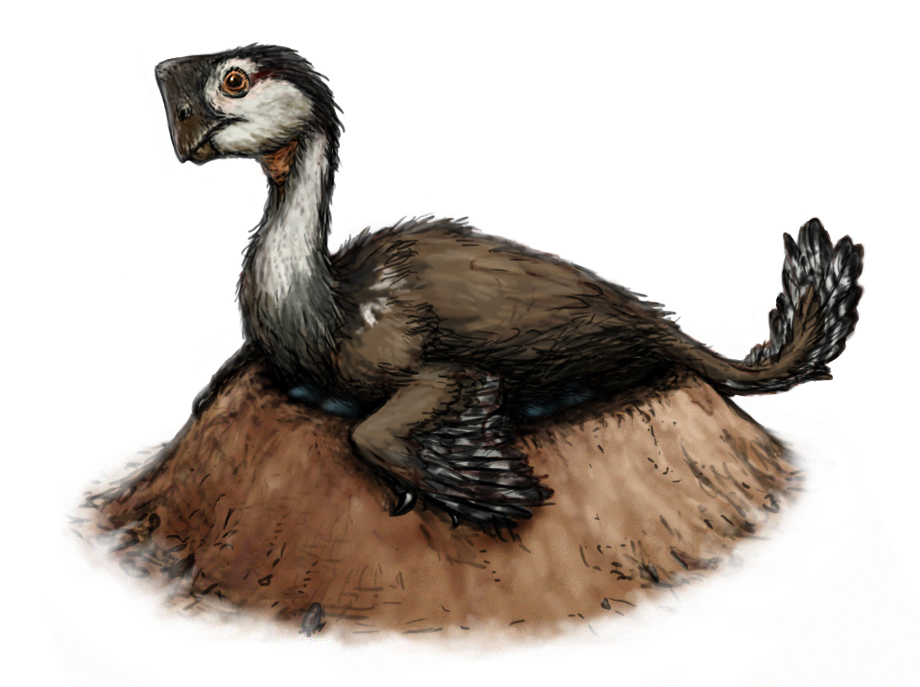
Artist's restoration of the oviraptorid Nemegtomaia brooding on its nest.

Many associations between adult oviraptorosaur skeletons or embryos with elongatoolithid eggs (including Macroolithus) demonstrate that Macroolithus and other elongatoolithids were laid by oviraptorosaurs. One oviraptorosaur skeleton from the Upper Cretaceous of China was described in 2005; two shelled elongatoolithid eggs were preserved inside of its pelvis. This suggests that oviraptorosaurs had two functional oviducts where both would produce eggs simultaneously. While Sato et al. did not refer the eggs specifically to Macroolithus, they noted that the eggs closely resemble M. yaotunensis, though with a thinner eggshell. The thin eggshell, however, could simply be because the shell had not finished forming when the mother died, or because of biochemical dissolution of the shell before fossilization.

Multiple different genera of oviraptorids have been found on or near elongatoolithid nests indicating that oviraptorid parents would brood on their eggs, most likely for extended periods of time. There is some evidence to suggest that oviraptorid and troodontid eggs were cared for by the father, perhaps in a polygamous system. Given the large size of eggs relative to the parent, a mother would only lay two eggs at a time, so the eggs of a single nest may have been contributed by multiple females.

=== Nests ===
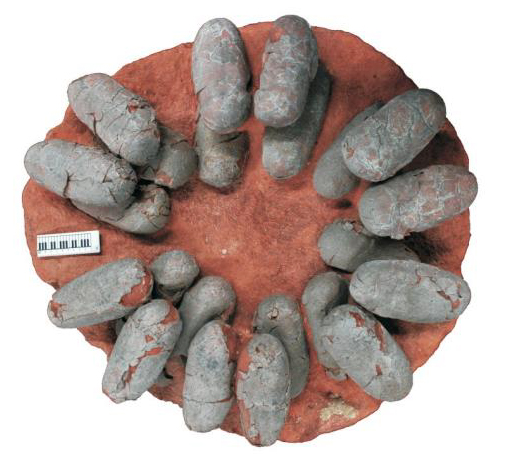
A fossilized nest of oviraptorid eggs

Multiple well preserved Macroolithus nests are known, representing M. rugustus and M. yaotunensis. A very well preserved clutch of M. yaotunensis contains 20 eggs arrayed in two, possibly three, circular layers. When complete this nest may have contained 40 or more eggs.

Tanaka et al. (2015) found that among modern archosaurs (the group including birds, crocodilians, and dinosaurs), the porosity of eggshells can be used to accurately predict whether the eggs are buried or laid in open nests. They concluded that Macroolithus nests were either open or only partially covered with vegetation. The eggs' blue-green coloration could have acted as a camouflage to hide the nest from predators.

M. rugustus eggs at Tsagan Khushu in Mongolia represent a coastal colonial nesting site.

=== Embryos ===
A few Macroolithus eggs preserve embryonic remains of oviraptorids inside. Two eggs containing embryos found in the Upper Cretaceous Nanxiong Formation near Ganzhou, Jiangxi were referred to M. yaotunensis in 2008. One of these embryos shows a much greater degree of bone development (ossification) than the other; it preserves ossified hind limbs and several vertebrae. The fact that the cervical vertebrae not only have ossified centra and neural arches, but also have ossified zygapophyses, led Cheng et al. to conclude that this embryo may in fact represent a hatchling, since in modern chickens and skuas these zygaphyses are cartilaginous until hatching. Also, the embryo's foot anatomy (specifically, the proportions of its metatarsals) resembles that of the oviraptorid Heyuannia huangi, indicating that these eggs belong to H. huangi or a similar species. The other egg has a much less developed embryo, with only the hind limbs preserved. While this does not permit comparison on the species level, the tibia (shinbone) confirms that it is an oviraptorosaur.

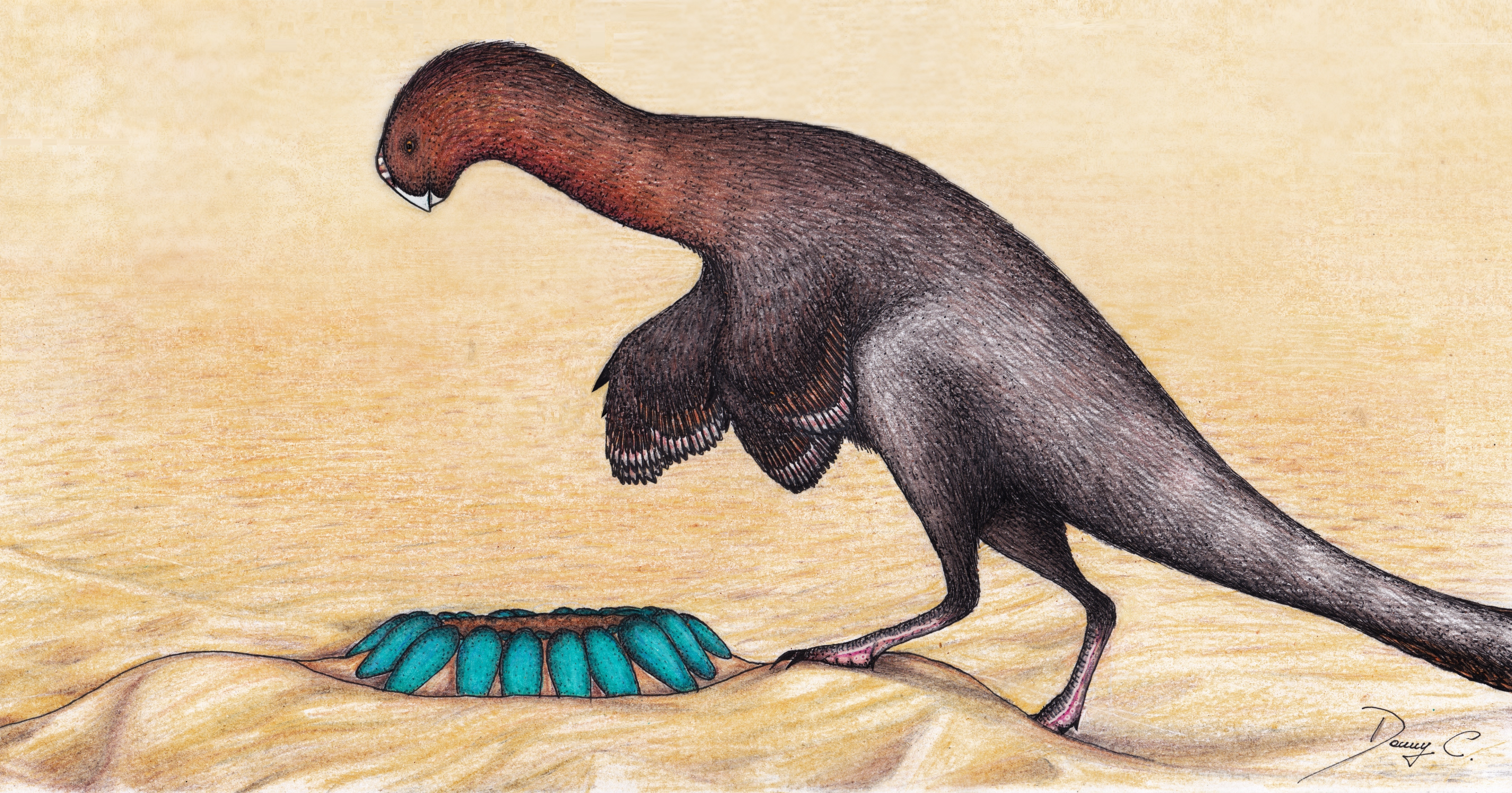
Artist's restoration of Heyuannia with its nest

Three more eggs containing embryos from the same formation were described in 2016 by Wang et al. Though they noted that these eggs strongly resemble M. yaotunensis, they declined to refer them to any ootaxon lower than Elongatoolithidae because Macroolithus is not clearly defined and is in need of revision. The embryos within these eggs are some of the most well-preserved of any oviraptorids, providing new information on oviraptorid ontogeny. The specimens show a relatively shallow head which indicates that as oviraptorids matured, their skulls grew dorsoventrally (top-to-bottom) faster than anteroposteriorly (front-to-back). This growth pattern is unusual among theropods, but is also seen in derived ("advanced") tyrannosaurids. Also unusual is that, even at this early stage of development, the nasal bones are fused. Coincidentally, tyrannosaurids also show fusion of the nasals early in development.

=== Pathology and extinction ===
Many Macroolithus specimens in South China have double- or multiple-layering of cones on the inner surface of the eggshell, a pathological condition known as ovum in ovo. It is especially prevalent among eggs nearest to the Cretaceous-Tertiary (K-T) boundary, which represents the end of the Mesozoic Era. This pathology is correlated with a higher concentration of trace elements like Co, Cr, Cu, Mn, Ni, Pb, Sr, V, and Zn. Experiments on modern birds have demonstrated that exposure to high levels of these elements will cause them to be incorporated into the eggshell, but the precise mechanism behind the pathological multi-layering is unknown. These abnormalities presumably affected hatchability of the eggs and may have played a role in the extinction of the dinosaurs. However, the embryonic remains inside three multilayered Macroolithus-like eggs from Ganzhou appear unaffected.

The K-T boundary is associated with abnormally high amounts of iridium, an element which is rare in Earth's crust, but relatively common in asteroids and in Earth's core. This has been used as evidence that a meteorite impact caused the extinction of the dinosaurs (the Alvarez hypothesis). However, some paleontologists attribute the extinction event and the iridium anomaly to more gradual climatic change caused by the volcanic activity of the Deccan Traps. The Nanxiong Basin has special relevance to this discussion because it contains the K-T boundary. However, the position of boundary, as well as the duration of the extinction have been subject to debate. Zhao et al. (2002 and 2009) have postulated that there were at least two iridium-delivering events over a time period consistent with the Deccan Traps volcanism, correlated with a gradual decline in diversity and eventual disappearance of fossil eggs from the Nanxiong Basin. According to their interpretation, Macroolithus survived 250,000 years into the early Paleocene. However, Buck et al. (2004) disputed these claims, arguing that debris flows mixed and reworked the sediments near the boundary, causing a blurring of the iridium anomaly and the appearance of eggshell fragments on both sides.

== Classification ==
Fossilized eggs are classified in their own, parataxonomic system parallel to Linnaean taxonomy. Macroolithus, Elongatoolithus, and Nanhsiungoolithus were the first oogenera ever named in this system; they were classified in the oofamily Elongatoolithidae. Cladistic analysis also supports the placement of Macroolithus close to Elongatoolithus, together with other elongatoolithids in a clade. Four oospecies are known: M. rugustus, M. yaotunensis, M. mutabilis, and M. lashuyuanensis. The oogenus's microstructures are poorly-defined and therefore may be in need of revision. When Mikhailov described M. mutabilis, he found no microstructural difference in Zhao's original illustrations of M. rugustus and M. yaotunensis, but did not synonymize the oospecies because Chinese paleontologists considered them distinct.

== History ==
=== Discoveries ===
Macroolithus eggs were first discovered in Southern China by the pioneering Chinese paleontologist Yang Zhongjian. He described the remains of several fossil eggs from that region in 1965. Working prior to the advent of modern fossil egg parataxonomy, he gave them names as species of Oolithes, a now-defunct name that was formerly used for various types of fossil eggs. In 1975, Chinese paleontologist Zhao Zikui prototyped the modern parataxonomic system, creating a hierarchical system of oofamilies, oogenera, and oospecies. Zhao placed Yang's O. rugustus into the new oogenus, Macroolithus, splitting it into two oospecies, M. yaotunensis and M. rugustus. He also suggested that the American oospecies "Oolithes" carlylensis (which is now classified in a different elongatoolithid oogenus, Macroelongatoolithus) be recombined as Macroolithus carlylensis.

In 1991, the Russian paleontologist Konstantin Mikhailov introduced the modern classification of fossil eggs based on Zhao's parataxonomic naming system. He classified "O." carlylensis in the oofamily Spheroolithidae, but otherwise followed Zhao's 1975 classification of Macroolithus. In 1994 he named M. mutabilis, a new oospecies of Macroolithus, based on remains discovered in Mongolia.

In 2000, a fourth oospecies, "M." turolensis, was described by Spanish paleontologists Olga Amo-Sanjuán, José Ignacio Canudo, and Gloria Cuenca-Bescós based on material from Spain. However, when new material of this oospecies was uncovered in 2014, it was moved into its own oogenus, Guegoolithus, which was furthermore moved to Spheroolithidae.

In 2005, eggs possibly attributable to M. yaotunensis were discovered paired inside the pelvis of a fossil oviraptorid skeleton. In 2008, Chinese paleontologists Cheng Yen-nien, Ji Qiang, Wu Xiao-chun and Shan Hsi-yin discovered a pair of eggs representing the first in China to contain embryonic remains of oviraptorosaurs. Both eggs were referred to M. yaotunensis. The fourth oospecies, M. lashuyuanensis, was described in 2009 by the Chinese paleontologists Fang Xiao-si, Li Pei-xian, Zhang Zhi-jun, Zhang Xian-qiu, Lin You-li, Guo Sheng-bin, Cheng Ye-ming, Li Zhen-yu, Zhang Xiao-jun and Cheng Zheng-wu.

In 2025, an additional clutch of Macroolithus yaotunensis was discovered from the Qiupa Formation, which was conjectured to be eggs laid by Yulong mini, the only oviraptorid from the same formation.

=== Paleobiological interpretations ===
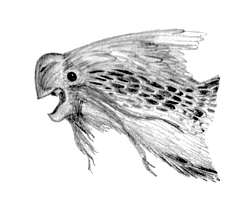
Restoration of Heyuannia, the putative parent of Macroolithus yaotunensis

In 1994, Mikhailov suggested that Macroolithus represented the eggs of a large theropod, specifically Tarbosaurus, based on the large size of the eggs and the largely overlapping distribution. However, the discovery of an oviraptorid embryo inside an elongatoolithid egg cast doubt on this hypothesis. With the discovery of multiple oviraptorosaur-elongatoolithid associations in the late 1990s, the eggs of elongatoolithids came to be accepted as belonging to oviraptorosaurian dinosaurs. Oviraptorid parentage was confirmed for Macroolithus when, in 2008, oviraptorid embryos resembling Heyuannia were discovered inside a pair of M. yaotunensis eggs in Jiangxi.

Early on, paleontologists considered Macroolithus nests to have been buried. Mou 1992 noted the high gas conductance values in Macroolithus eggs and therefore concluded that they were laid in a very humid environment, buried underground or inside a mound. Deeming (2006) found a similar result. This seems to contradict evidence that oviraptorosaurids brooded bird-like on their eggs, but Deeming suggested that Oviraptor buried its eggs in a mound and then Oviraptor and its relatives sat atop a nest mound to incubate, rather than directly contacting the eggs. However, Tanaka et al. (2015) criticized these results for lack of statistical rigor. They found, based on comparisons to modern eggs, that Macroolithus was predicted to be laid in open or partially covered nests. Wiemann et al. (2017) also criticized Mou and Deeming because they had only measured eggshell porosity at the middle section of the eggs and did not take into account the fact that the pore density is much lower near the poles. This would lead to an overestimate of the total eggshell porosity and therefore an overestimate of the gas conductance value.

The extinctions of Macroolithus and other eggs from Southern China have also had a history of different interpretations. In the 1990s, Chinese paleontologists, including the prominent egg specialist Zhao Zikui, observed a gradual reduction in dinosaur egg diversity during the final 200,000 to 300,000 years of the Cretaceous, with only Macroolithus ranging up to the boundary. They postulated, contrary to the impact hypothesis, that the extinction was the result of a prolonged drought that increased the concentration of trace heavy metals, which adversely affected eggshell and embryo development of the dinosaurs causing the population to gradually decline and collapse. Zhao et al. revised this hypothesis in 2002, postulating a gradual extinction of Macroolithus caused by the volcanism of the Deccan Traps. In 2004, Buck et al. disputed this interpretation, arguing that the apparent gradual extinction was an illusion caused by reworking of sediments. Zhao et al. (2009) maintained that the extinction event was gradual.

== Distribution and paleoecology ==
Macroolithus is known from myriad Late Cretaceous locations in China, Mongolia, and Kazakhstan.

=== Henan ===
In Henan, Macroolithus yaotunensis coexists with the other elongatoolithids Elongatoolithus andrewsi and E. elongatus, as well as Ovaloolithus and Paraspheroolithus of the Hugang, the Luyemiao, the Qiupa, and the Sigou Formations. These formations were formed during the Late Cretaceous in a lacustrine or palustrine environment. Dinosaur body fossils are rarely found in the same units, but troodontids, tyrannosaurs, and hadrosaurs are known from the same area.

=== Shandong ===
Some eggs tentatively assigned to Macroolithus are known from the Wangshi Group in Laiyang, Shandong. The formations of the Wangshi Group were deposited in alluvial fans, braided channels and shallow lakes. Common fossils include hadrosaurids and dinosaur eggs.

=== Southern China ===
M. rugustus, M. yaotunensis, and M. lashuyuanensis are all known from the Nanxiong Basin in Guangdong. This formation was deposited primary from streams, rivers, and lakes in that region. It spans across the K/T boundary, at which point most of the dinosaur eggs disappear, but Macroolithus apparently exists on both sides of the boundary (which would imply that some species of dinosaurs survived into the early Tertiary). However, sedimentological evidence suggests that these fossils were actually reworked by debris flows into the Tertiary rocks.

The Nanxiong Basin is known for its abundance of fossil eggs, predominantly the oviraptorisaurian eggs Elongatoolithus and Macroolithus. Other types of eggs include other elongatoolithids, as well as prismatoolithids, megaloolithids, and ovaloolithids. Footprints show that Nanxiong Basin was populated by ornithopods, theropods, and possibly sauropods.

Southern China, particularly the Nanxiong Formation in Jiangxi Province, possibly has the greatest oviraptorosaur diversity in the world, and also includes several associations of oviraptorosaurs with Macroolithus or similar eggs. Titanosaurs and tyrannosaurids are also known from this area. Non-dinosaur fauna includes lizards and the terrestrial nanhsiungchelyid turtles.

=== Mongolia ===
Macroolithus rugustus is abundant in the Nemegt Formation, which dates to the late Campanian to early Maastrichtian. This formation represents depositions of a meandering river. Well-preserved dinosaur remains are common in the Nemegt Formation, including oviraptorosaurs, titanosaurs, troodontids, tyrannosaurs, ankylosaurs, pachycephalosaurs, hadrosaurs, ornithomimosaurs, alvarezsaurs, and therizinosaurs. Remains of small animals are relatively rare, but several types of birds are known from Nemegt, as well as several types of multituberculate mammals. Other fossil eggs from the Nemegt Formation include Ovaloolithus, Spheroolithus, Elongatoolithus, and Laevisoolithus.

M. mutabilis is known solely at the Ikh-Shunkht locality from the Barun Goyot Formation, dating from the Santonian to Campanian. M. rugustus is also known from the Barun Goyot Formation, which represents a sand-dune filled eolian environment. Compared to the Nemegt Formation, large dinosaurs are rare at Barun Goyot, where the fauna is dominated by protoceratopsids, oviraptorids, and ankylosaurids. Other types of fossil eggs from the Barun Goyot Formation include Protoceratopsidovum, Gobioolithus, Faveoloolithus, Dendroolithus, Spheroolithus, and Subtiliolithus.

=== Kazakhstan ===
M. rugustus has also been found in the Manrak Formation (also called Manrakskaya Svita) of the Zaisan Basin in the East Kazakhstan Region. This formation is near to the Tayzhuzgen River, and dates to some time in the late Cretaceous, probably the Maastrictian.

== See also ==
- List of dinosaur oogenera
- Dinosaur reproduction
- Dinosaur coloration
