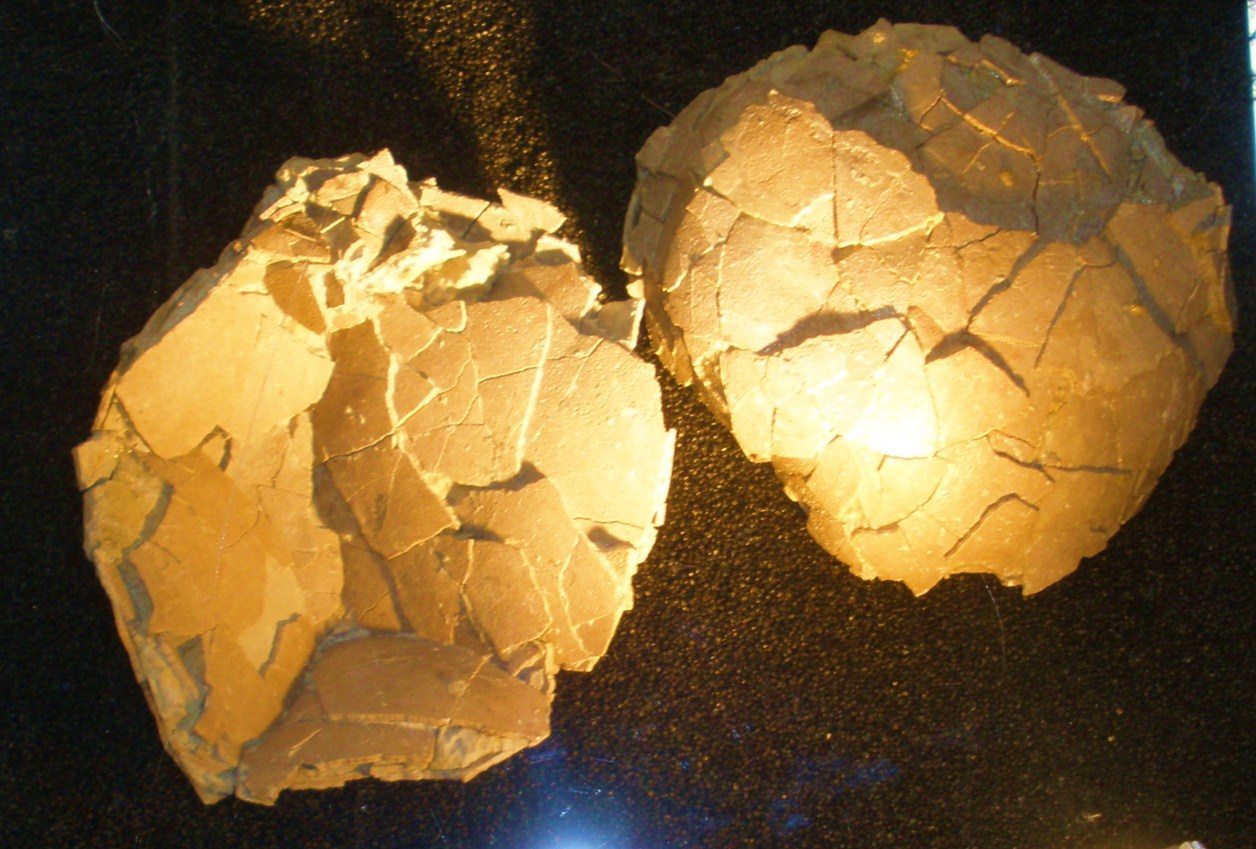
- Cairanoolithus dughii

Egg fossil classification
- Basic shell type: †Dinosauroid-spherulitic
- Oofamily: †Cairanoolithidae; Sellés and Galobart, 2015
- Oogenus: †Cairanoolithus; Vianey-Liaud et al., 1994

Oospecies
- C. dughii (type) Vianey-Liaud et al., 1994; C. roussetensis Vianey-Liaud et al., 1994

Synonyms
- Dughioolithus Vianey-Liaud et al., 1994

= Cairanoolithus =

Cairanoolithus Temporal range: Late Cretaceous

Oogenus of dinosaur egg

Cairanoolithus is an oogenus of dinosaur egg which is found in Southwestern Europe. The eggs are large (15–19 centimetres or 6–7 1/2 inches in diameter) and spherical. Their outer surface is either smooth, or covered with a subdued pattern of ridges interspersed with pits and grooves. Multiple fossil egg clutches are known but the nest structure is unclear.

The parent of Cairanoolithus is probably some kind of non-ornithopod ornithischian, possibly the nodosaurid Struthiosaurus.

The eggs were first named in 1994, when the two oospecies were classified in distinct oogenera as Cairanoolithus dughii and Dughioolithus roussetensis. They are now considered to belong in a single oogenus, possibly even a single oospecies. Though it has been classified as a megaloolithid, Cairanoolithus is now placed in its own oofamily, Cairanoolithidae.

== Description ==
Size of the smallest and largest eggs attributed to Cairanoolithus

Cairanoolithus eggs are spherical and fairly large, measuring 15–19 cm (6–7 1/2 in) in diameter. The outer surface is smooth or covered with a subdued netlike pattern of ridges, interspersed with pits and grooves (sagenotuberculate ornamentation). The eggshells are made up of partially interlocking column-shaped shell units and range from 1.10 to 2.65 mm (3/64 to 13/128 in) thick.

Several egg clutches of C. dughii are known, containing as many as 27 fossilized eggs. However, taphonomical alterations (changes during the fossilization process) make it difficult to determine the original structure of the nest. Cousin (2002) hypothesized that Cairanoolithus eggs were laid on the surface of the ground, possibly buried beneath a mound of plant matter. Tanaka et al. (2015) noted that the shell had a relatively high porosity. Therefore, they concluded that Cairanoolithus nests were covered by organic or inorganic material.

=== Oospecies ===
Two oospecies of Cairanoolithus have been described:

- Cairanoolithus dughii is the type oospecies. At 1.57–2.41 mm (1/16–3/32 in), its eggshell is slightly thicker than that of C. roussetensis. It has slender, partially fused columnar eggshell units. Their outer surface is almost without ornamentation, and the inner surface is covered with hollows once filled by organic cores. C. dughii's eggshell exhibits an angusticanaliculate pore system, i.e. its pores are long, narrow, and straight.
- Cairanoolithus roussetensis, which was formerly classified in its own oogenus, Dughioolithus, can be distinguished from C. dughii by its thinner eggshell (measuring 1.11–1.77 mm or 3/64–9/128 in thick), its broader eggshell units, and the relative prominence of its ornamentation. Like C. dughii, C. roussetensis typically has an angusticanaliculate pore system, though some specimens have prolatocanaliculate pores, meaning they have variable diameter across their length.

Some authors consider the two oospecies to be synonymous. Cousin (2002) argued that the differences between them were due to intraspecific variation or due to taphonomy. He also described several eggshell fragments that possibly belong to an additional distinct oospecies of Cairanoolithus; however these specimens were referred to C. roussetensis by Sellés and Galobart (2015).

== Classification ==
- Archosauria
  - Theropoda
  - - Crocodylomorpha
    - - "non‑theropod dinosaurs"
        - Prosauropod egg
        - - Megaloolithus jabalpurensis
          - M. dhoridungriensis
        - cf. Faveoloolithus
        - - Cairanoolithus
          - - Guegoolithus
            - - Spheroolithus
              - Ovaloolithus

Simplified version of Selles and Galobart's cladogram, showing the position of Cairanoolithus relative to other non-theropod dinosaur eggs.

While it was formerly considered a megaloolithid, Cairanoolithus is now considered to belong its own monotypic oofamily, Cairanoolithidae. It belongs to the dinosauroid-spherulitic basic type, a group including sauropod eggs and ornithischian eggs, but paraphyletically excluding theropod eggs.

The cladistic analysis done by Selles and Galobart in 2015 recovered Cairanoolithus as a sister taxon to the clade of ornithopod eggs Guegoolithus, Spheroolithus, and Ovaloolithus. Therefore, they considered it likely that Cairanoolithus belongs to a non-ornithopod ornithischian dinosaur.

=== Parentage ===
Since embryos are unknown in cairanoolithid eggs, the identity of their parent is uncertain. They have long been considered to be eggs of titanosaurs or ornithopods (like Rhabdodon). However, numerous characteristics distinguish Cairanoolithus from sauropod eggs (oofamilies Megaloolithidae and Faveoloolithidae), even though they bear superficial similarities in size and shape. Cairanoolithus's columnar eggshell units are quite unlike the fan-shaped ones seen in Megaloolithus, Faveoloolithus, or Fusioolithus. Also, its subdued ornamentation contrasts strongly with the heavily sculpted eggshells of sauropod eggs, and it has a different pore system. Eggs of ornithopods (Spheroolithidae and Ovaloolithidae), on the other hand, show much closer similarity to cairanoolithids in ornamentation and pore system. However, ornithopod eggs are typically much smaller, and the crystal structure of their eggshell units is distinct.

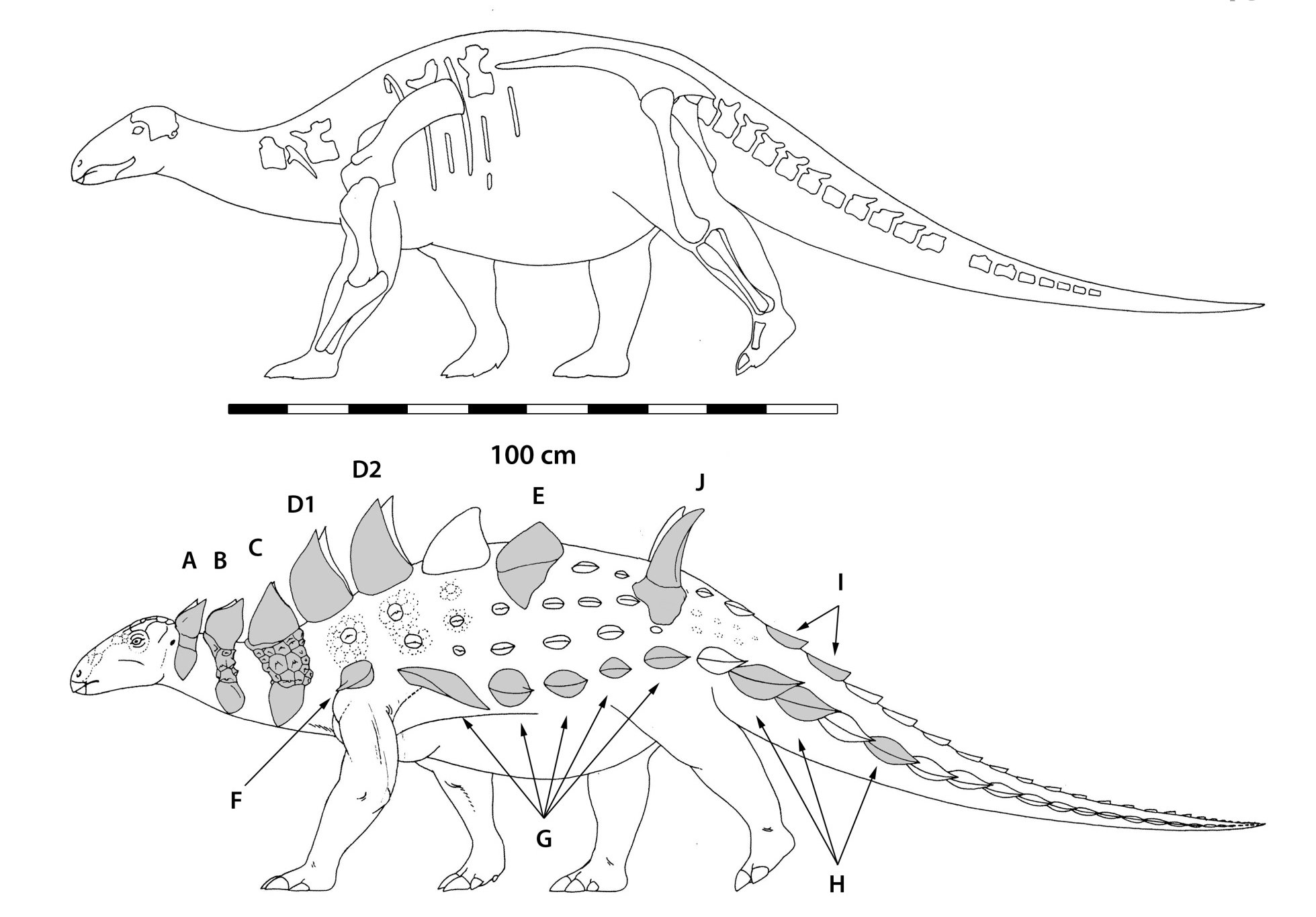
Restorations of Struthiosaurus, the possible parent of Cairanoolithus

The cladistic analysis by Sellés and Galobart in 2015 supported an ornithischian parentage. Late Campanian to early Maastrichtian ornithischians from Southwestern Europe are restricted to rhabdodontids and the nodosaurid Struthiosaurus. When Sellés and Galobart analyzed the pelvises of Rhabdodon (the largest known rhabdodontid) and Struthiosaurus, they found that Rhabdodon could not have laid eggs as big as Cairanoolithus. On the other hand, even though Struthiosaurus was relatively small, the unique orientation of its ischia would have easily allowed it to lay eggs as large as a 19 cm (7 1/2 in) cairanoolithid egg. However, interpreting Cairanoolithus as the eggs of a nodosaur does raise the question of why Cairanoolithus or similar eggs have not been found in areas with a greater nodosaur abundance.

== Distribution ==
Cairanoolithus is native to Southwestern Europe, including southern France and northern Iberia. Its fossils date to the late Campanian to early Maastrichtian. They are usually found in the Aix-en-Provence Basin below the Rognac Limestone. C. dughii is from the La Cairanne site in Bouches du Rhône, France, and from Roquehautes-Grand Creux; Cairanoolithus of undetermined oospecies is also known from the Villeveyrac Basin. C. roussetensis is found in the northern part of Iberia (Tremp Group of Spain), and from southern France (in Rousset Village, Roquehautes-Crete du Marbre, the Villeveyrac Basin, and Argelliers-Montarnaud).

== Paleoecology ==
The Late Cretaceous ecosystems of Europe (which was then an island archipelago) show complex mixing of taxa originating from Africa, Asia, and North America. In Southwestern Europe, Cairanoolithus co-occurs with numerous other types of fossil eggs; Megaloolithus is particularly common, but theropod eggs such as Prismatoolithus and the ornithopod egg Spheroolithus europaeus are also present. Dinosaur body fossils are also common, including nodosaurids, rhabdodontids, titanosaurs, dromaeosaurids, basal iguanodontians, hadrosaurids, neoceratosaurians, and coelurosaurs. Other vertebrates include bony fish, squamates, cryptodiran turtles, alligatorids, and mammals.

== History ==
In 1869, French paleontologist Philippe Matheron described fossil reptiles from the Aix Basin. In the 1950s, Raymond Dughi and Francois Sirugue, a pair of French paleontologists working for the Museum d'Histoire Naturelle Aix-en-Provence, extensively studied the basin's fossil eggshells. They divided the eggs they had found into ten different types, but they did not describe them in detail. In the 1970s and 1980s, further work was done by the French paleontologist P. Kerourio and the German paleontologist H. K. Erben.

In his 1983 doctoral thesis, M. M. Penner devised one of the early classification schemes for egg fossils. He was the first to recognize the eggs now named Cairanoolithus as a distinct type; under his classification scheme, they were called "Group 2". In 1994, French paleontologists M. Vianey-Liaud, P. Mallan, O. Buscail and C. Montgelard described them under the modern parataxonomic system as Cairanoolithus dughii and "Dughioolithus" roussetensis. They did not assign either of them to any oofamily, but both oogenera were classified in the oofamily Megaloolithidae by the Russian paleontologist Konstantin Mikhailov and colleagues in 1996. Following further discoveries in 2001, Géraldine Garcia and Monique Vianey-Liaud synonymized the two oogenera. In 2002, French paleontologist R. Cousin took a step further and synonymized the two oospecies.

In 2012, the first Cairanoolithus fossils discovered outside of France were first reported by Albert G. Selles in his PhD thesis at Universitat de Barcelona, in which he also proposed that Cairanoolithus be moved into its own oofamily. Three years later, Selles and Angel Galobart published a comprehensive reanalysis of Cairanoolithus, in which they formally named the new oofamily, Cairanoolithidae, to contain Cairanoolithus. Contrary to Cousin's conclusions, Selles and Galobart separated the oospecies C. dughii and C. roussetensis. Also, they argued that Cairanoolithus was not the eggs of an ornithopod or sauropod and conjectured that it could be the eggs of a nodosaur.
