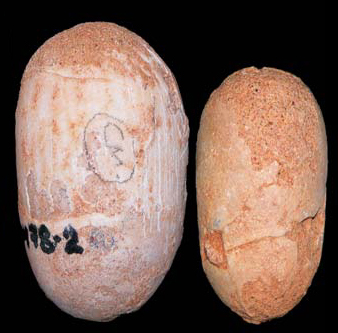
- Gobioolithus major (left) compared to G. minor (right)

Egg fossil classification
- Basic shell type: Ornithoid
- Morphotype: †Ornithoid-prismatic
- Oofamily: †Gobioolithidae
- Oogenus: †Gobioolithus; Mikhailov, 1996

Oospecies
- †G. minor Mikhailov, 1996 (type); †G. major Mikhailov, 1996

= Gobioolithus =

Gobioolithus Temporal range: Campanian ~84–70 Ma

Fossil bird egg native to Mongolia

Gobioolithus is an oogenus of fossil bird egg native to Mongolia. They are small, smooth-shelled, and elongated eggs that were first discovered in the 1960s and early 70s during a series of fossil-hunting expeditions in the Gobi Desert. Two oospecies have been described: Gobioolithus minor and G. major. The eggs were probably laid in colonial nesting sites on the banks of rivers and lakes.

G. minor is unusual because it frequently is found with embryonic skeletons of the enantiornithine bird Gobipipus. These embryos have well-developed wings, which suggest they would be able to fly very soon after hatching, unlike most modern birds.

== Description ==
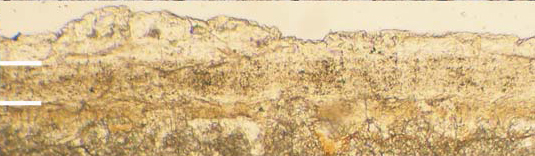
Thin section of G. minor shell

Gobioolithus eggs are small and smooth-shelled. They are asymmetrically shaped, similar to many modern bird eggs, with one end pointier than the other. The two oospecies are distinguished mainly by their size: G. major ranges from 50 to 53.5 mm long and 25 to 32 mm across, with an eggshell thickness of 0.2-0.4 mm, whereas G. minor is only 30–46 mm by 20–24 mm and 0.1-0.2 mm thick.

The microstructure of Gobioolithus' eggshell has not been thoroughly studied, and heavy recrystallization of most specimens makes it difficult to examine the eggshell structure or pore system. The eggshell consists of two (or possibly three) structural layers. The inner layer, called the mammillary layer, is about half the thickness of the outer, or continuous, layer. On the outside, many specimens have a recrystallized outer layer. This could simply due to diagenesis or it could be a true external zone, which is a third layer present in many bird eggs but is rare in non-avian theropods. However, a few specimens are unaffected by recrystallization. These do not have a third layer, but this does not rule out the possibility that the eggshell originally had a three layers since the external layer can easily separate from the rest of the eggshell. These specimens also reveal an angusticanaliculate pore system, which means that the pores have a low density, and are long, narrow, and straight.

Styloolithus, another fossil bird egg from the Gobi, differs from Gobioolithus in that it is larger and has a thicker eggshell with a proportionately smaller mammillary layer. Laevisoolithids, which are also eggs of enantiornithines, are also larger than Gobioolithus, but they have a much thicker mammillary layer.

=== Embryos ===
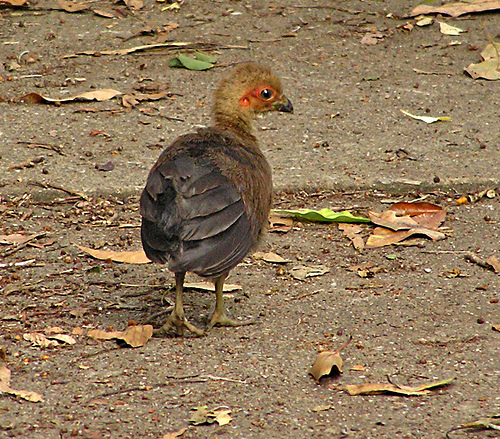
A modern megapode chick (Alectura lathami) with well-developed wings, similar to the embryos in Gobioolithus.

Many Gobioolithus minor specimens contain embryonic remains of the enantiornithine genus Gobipipus. The embryos have well-ossified skeletons, implying that they were at a late stage in development when they died. Their wings and shoulders are especially well-developed. Only the modern megapodes and the little tern exhibit a comparable degree of embryonic ossification in the arm and shoulder bones. It is likely that Gobipipus hatchlings, like megapodes, would be able to fly very soon after hatching.

No embryos are known from G. major eggs, but they are usually assumed to have been laid by a similar type of bird.

=== Nests ===
Gobioolithus eggs were probably laid in open nests on the banks of ephemeral rivers or lakes, which could frequently flood the nesting areas and bury the eggs. The distribution of the eggs suggests that they had a long-term colonial nesting site at the Khermeen Tsav locality in the Barun Goyot Formation. At the Bayn-Dzak locality, the eggs are typically arranged in clutches, whereas elsewhere they are scattered randomly, each oriented nearly vertically in the substrate. The solitary eggs may have been laid and buried individually, similar to the nesting habits of modern megapodes. It is also possible that they were originally laid in clutches, but flooding separated them and deposited them vertically as the water level dropped. Water damage would also explain why Gobioolithus shells are frequently heavily recrystallized.

== Classification ==
According to the parataxonomic system used to classify fossil eggs, Gobioolithus is classified in the oofamily Gobioolithidae, which, in turn, is classified in the prismatic morphotype (also called the neognath morphotype) of the ornithoid basic type. A cladistic analysis performed by Varricchio and Barta (2015) (pictured below) found Gobioolithus minor to be a sister taxon to Styloolithus. However, they considered Styloolithus different enough from Gobioolithus to warrant its exclusion from Gobioolithidae.

- - - - Prismatoolithus levis
      - Troodon eggs
    - Prismatoolithus gebiensis
    - Protoceratopsidovum sincerum
  - - - Parvoolithus tortuosus
      - Neognath eggs
    - Paleognath eggs
    - - Gobioolithus minor
      - Styloolithus sabathi

== Distribution ==
Gobioolithus is found in the Gobi Desert in Mongolia. More specifically, the fossils are found in the Barun Goyot and the Djadokhta Formations of the Nemegt Basin, which is dated to the Upper Cretaceous.

== History ==
Numerous fossils, including Gobioolithus specimens, were discovered and collected by the Polish-Mongolian fossil-hunting expeditions in the Gobi Desert from 1963 to 1971 and by the Soviet-Mongolian expeditions between 1969 and 1996. These fossils were brought to the Institute of Paleobiology of the Polish Academy of Sciences in Warsaw and to the Paleontological Institute of the Russian Academy of Sciences in Moscow. Eggs now classified as Gobioolithus were first analyzed in 1981 by the Polish paleontologist Andrzej Elżanowski, who described several well-developed bird embryos within some of the fossil eggs housed in Warsaw. He identified them as most similar to Gobipteryx minuta, so scientists began referring to them as "Gobipteryx eggs".

In 1991, the Russian paleontologist Konstantin Mikhailov introduced the modern parataxonomic system used to classify fossil eggs. While he did not give the "Gobipteryx" eggs a formal name under this classification scheme, he did assign them to the prismatic morphotype in the ornithoid basic type. He believed that they were eggs of volant paleognaths, but probably not Gobipteryx (which was then considered to be a paleognath). In the same year, the Polish paleontologist Karol Sabath reviewed the entire collection of fossil eggs discovered on the Polish expeditions, including the not-yet-named Gobioolithus eggs. Following Elżanowski, he referred them to Gobipteryx, though only tentatively because at the time ongoing studies of similar eggs found on the Soviet expeditions cast doubt on this classification.

In 1994, Mikhailov, working with Sabath and Kurzanov, divided the Mongolian "Gobipteryx" eggs into two informal groups: G1, containing the smaller eggs (including the ones with embryos described by Elżanowski), and G2 for the larger eggs. Two years later, Mikhailov went on to classify these eggs parataxonomically as a new oofamily, Gobioolithidae, containing the single oogenus Gobioolithus, with two oospecies: G. minor and G. major, corresponding to G1 and G2, respectively. In 2013, Kurochkin, Chatterjee, and Mikhailov described a new genus and species of bird, Gobipipus reshetovi, based on the embryos within Gobioolithus eggs. They classified Gobipipus as an enantiornithine. In 2015, some of the larger egg specimens previously assigned to G. major were moved into their own new oogenus and oospecies, Styloolithus sabathi.
