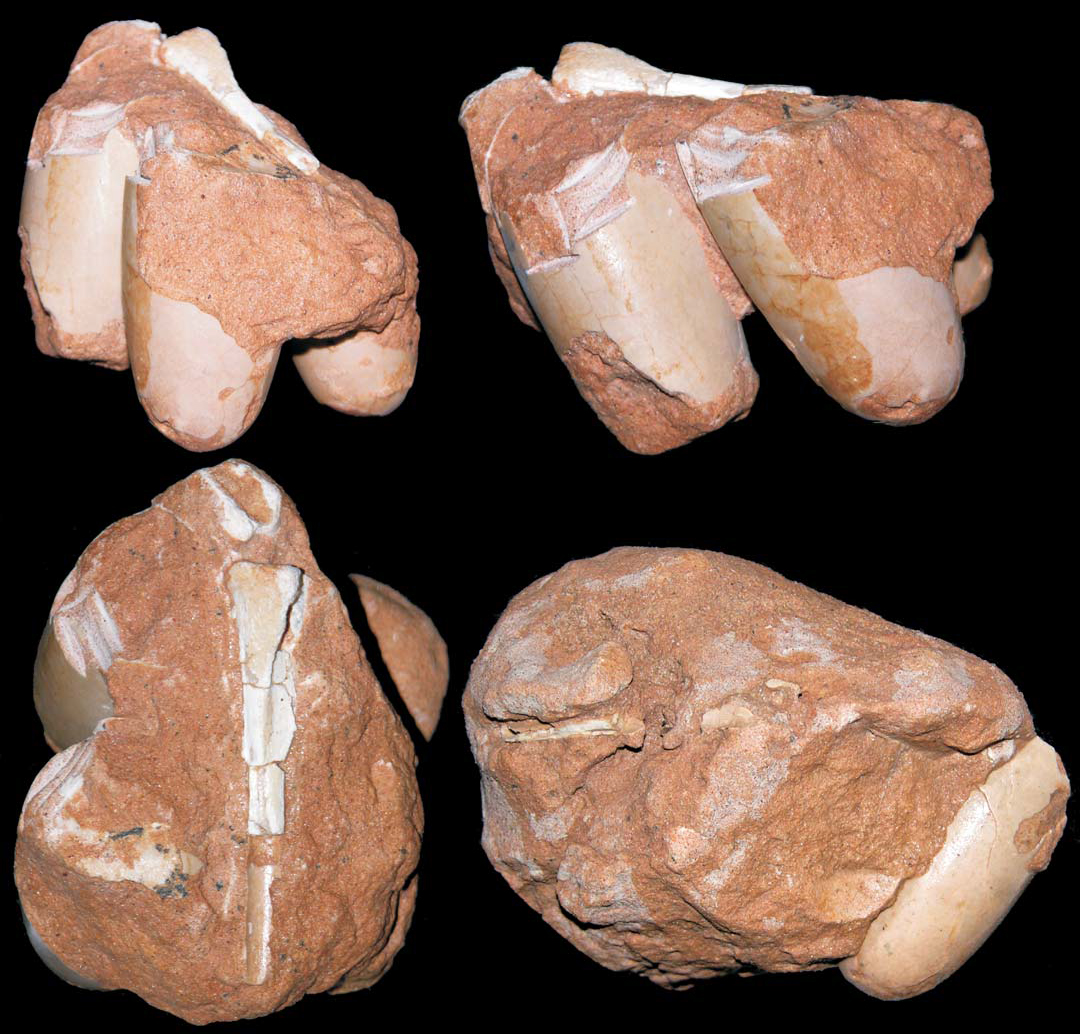
- Two partial cluthces

Egg fossil classification
- Oofamily: incertae sedis
- Oogenus: †Styloolithus

Oospecies
- †S. sabathi

= Styloolithus =

Styloolithus Temporal range: Upper Cretaceous

Oogenus of fossil egg

Styloolithus is an oogenus of highly distinctive fossil egg from the Upper Cretaceous Djadokhta Formation and the Barun Goyot Formation in Mongolia.

== History ==
The eggs of Styloolithus were first discovered in 1991 by Karol Sabath in an assemblage of fossil eggs in the Gobi Desert, and were described as "larger avian eggs". They were considered classified as Gobioolithus major in 1996 by Mikhailov. In 2015, Varracchio and Barta redefined G. major, and reclassified the "larger avian eggs" into an entirely new oogenus, Styloolithus.

== Description ==
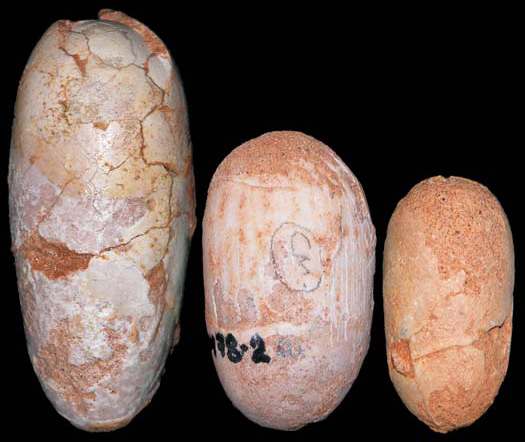
Styloolithus egg next to two Gobioolithus

The type specimen of Styloolithus is a fossil clutch of at least four eggs and associated adult remains (probably representing the parent). Several other fossil eggs are also known. The egg clutches are tightly packed together, like Prismatoolithus and Troodontid eggs, in contrast to the loosely scattered nests of enantiornithine birds. However, the eggs themselves are quite different from Troodontids, and the associated skeletal remains are similar to the enantiornithine Gobipteryx minuta (=Nanantius valifanovi).

S. sabathi eggs are quite different from all other known fossil eggs of the Cretaceous. At 70 mm long and 32 mm across, they are larger than both oospecies of Gobioolithus, and more elongated. It can be distinguished from all non-avian dinosaur eggs by the thick third layer of the shell (possibly representing an external zone). It lacks shell ornamentation, unlike Elongatoolithus and Macroelongatoolithus.

The eggs are interesting because of the possible presence of an external zone, the outer layer of the eggshell which is rare outside of bird eggs. If correctly interpreted, this would prove that Styloolithus in fact represents bird eggs. However, it cannot be proven to have an external layer until its shell is examined by scanning electron microscopy.

== Parataxonomy ==
When they were first discovered in 1991, Styloolithus eggs (then unnamed) were described as bird eggs. The three phylogenetic analyses performed by Varracchio and Barta (2015) were inconclusive as to whether it represented a bird or a non-avian theropod. However, it is most likely avian because it has an unornamented, thin shell that probably has three structural layers, a combination of characters unique to bird eggs. Also, the bones found associated with the eggs seem to be avian.

== Palaeobiology ==
The association of adult bones with Styloolithus eggs suggests intense parental care. The tight egg clutches show that the incubation methods differed from that of Gobipteryx. Like Troodontids, the parents of Styloolithus probably sat on top of largely buried eggs. It is unknown whether S. sabathi was incubated by the father or the mother of the eggs.
