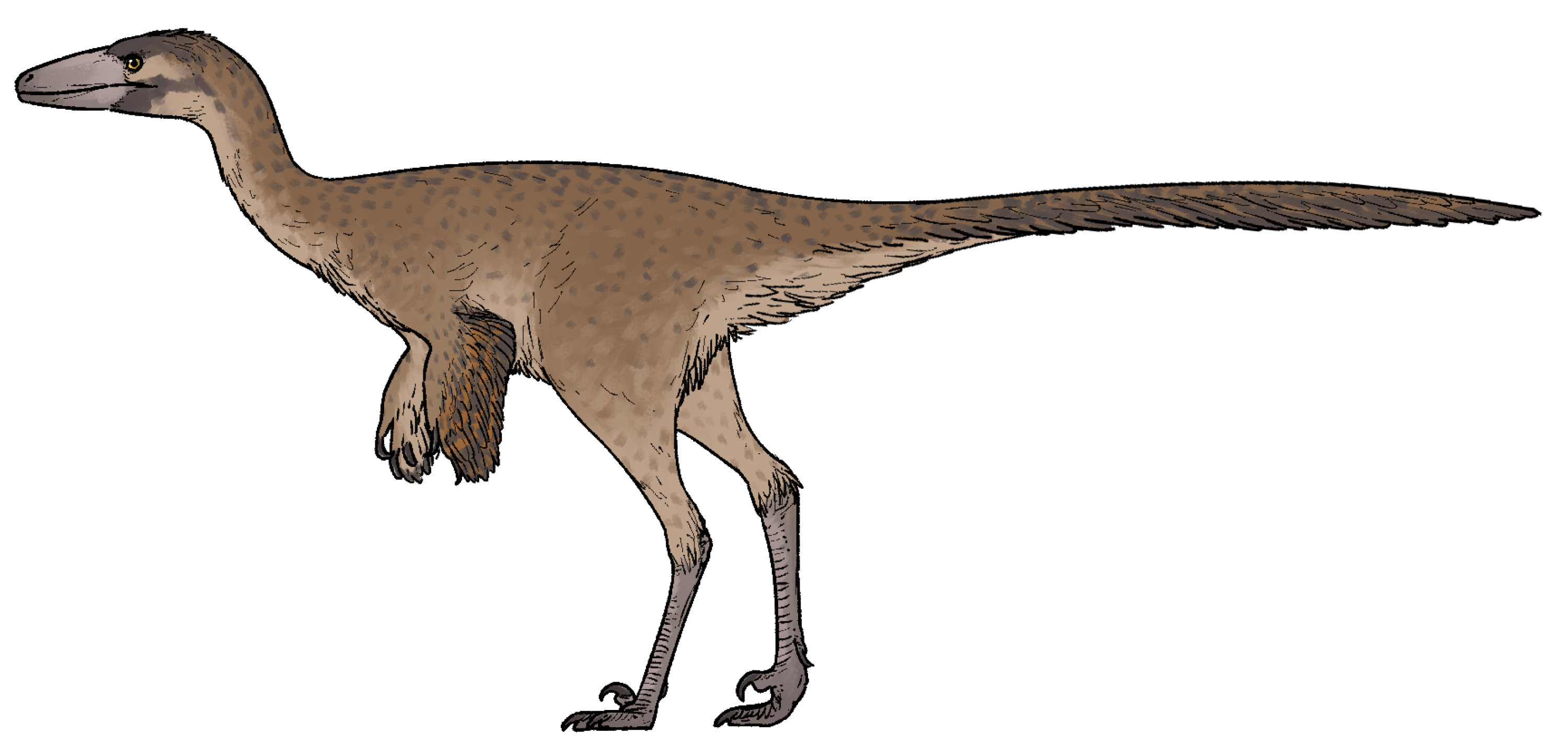
- Life restoration

Scientific classification
- Kingdom: Animalia
- Phylum: Chordata
- Class: Reptilia
- Clade: Dinosauria
- Clade: Saurischia
- Clade: Theropoda
- Family: †Troodontidae
- Genus: †Harenadraco; Lee et al., 2024
- Species: †H. prima

Binomial name
- †Harenadraco prima Lee et al., 2024

= Harenadraco =

Harenadraco Temporal range: Late Cretaceous (late Campanian?)

Genus of troodontid dinosaurs

Harenadraco (meaning "sand dragon") is an extinct genus of troodontid theropod dinosaurs from the Upper Cretaceous Baruungoyot Formation of Mongolia. The genus contains a single species, H. prima, known from a fragmentary skeleton. Harenadraco represents the first troodontid known from the Baruungoyot Formation. Since members of this family are also known from the Nemegt and Djadochta Formations, the discovery of Harendraco indicates that troodontids were important faunal components of every formation within the Nemegt Basin.

== Discovery and naming ==
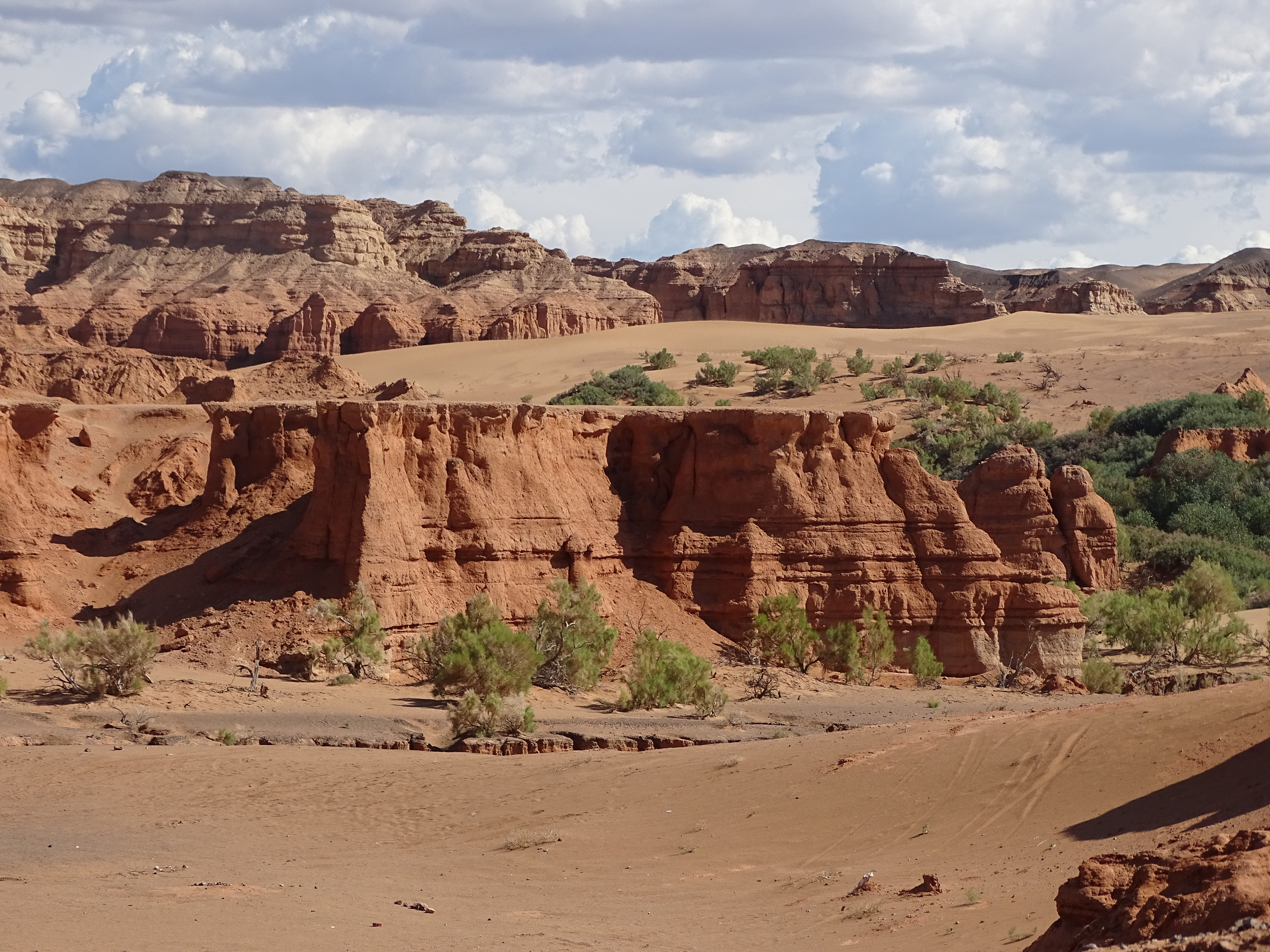
Outcrops of the Baruungoyot Formation (Hermiin Tsav locality), which produced the Harenadraco holotype and many other dinosaur specimens

The Harenadraco holotype specimen, MPC-D 110/119, was discovered in 2018 in sediments of the Baruungoyot Formation (Hermiin Tsav locality) in Ömnögovi Province, Mongolia. The specimen consists of a fragmentary and partially articulated skeleton, comprising pieces of the right ilium, the end of the right femur, and several bones from the left hind leg, including the top of the femur, the end of the tibiotarsus, the second through fourth metatarsals, and several pedal phalanges. Some unidentified bone fragments are also associated with the skeleton.

In 2024, Lee et al. described Harenadraco prima as a new genus and species of troodontid theropod based on these fossil remains. The generic name, Harenadraco , combines the Latin words "harena", meaning "sand", and "draco", meaning "dragon". The specific name, prima, is a Latin word meaning "first", referencing the fact that Harenadraco is the first troodontid known from its geological formation.

== Classification ==
In their phylogenetic analyses, Lee et al. (2024) recovered Harenadraco, along with an unnamed specimen from the Wulansuhai Formation, as the earliest diverging members of an otherwise entirely Chinese clade of troodontids. This clade is the sister taxon to all other troodontids. Their results are displayed in the cladogram below:

- Troodontidae
  - - Harenadraco
    - LH PV39 (unnamed Wulansuhai Fm. taxon)
    - - Mei
      - - Sinusonasus
        - Sinovenator
  - - - MPC-D 100/44 ("EK troodontid")
      - Sinornithoides
    - - MPC-D100/1126+D100/3500 (unnamed Djadokhta Fm. taxon)
      - - Almas
        - - - Philovenator
            - - Talos
              - Gobivenator
          - - Xixiasaurus
            - Byronosaurus
            - - Zanabazar
              - - Saurornithoides
                - - Linhevenator
                  - Troodon

== Paleoecology ==
Harenadraco is known from the Hermiin Tsav locality of the Baruungoyot Formation. This locality is known for its abundant dinosaur remains. Based on stratigraphy and fossil content, the formation is consistently regarded as Late Cretaceous (possibly Upper Campanian) in age, although radiometric dates have not been determined.

=== Paleoenvironment ===
The Baruungoyot Formation is largely characterized by red beds, with many light-colored well-cemented sands (yellowish, grey-brown, and some reddish). Some sandy claystones (often red-colored), siltstones, conglomerates, and cross-bedded sands are also common. The formation's geology indicates that sediments were likely deposited under relatively arid to semiarid climates in alluvial plain (flat land consisting of sediments deposited by highland rivers), lacustrine (lake), and aeolian (wind-shaped) paleoenvironments, with occasional short-lived water bodies.

=== Contemporary fauna ===
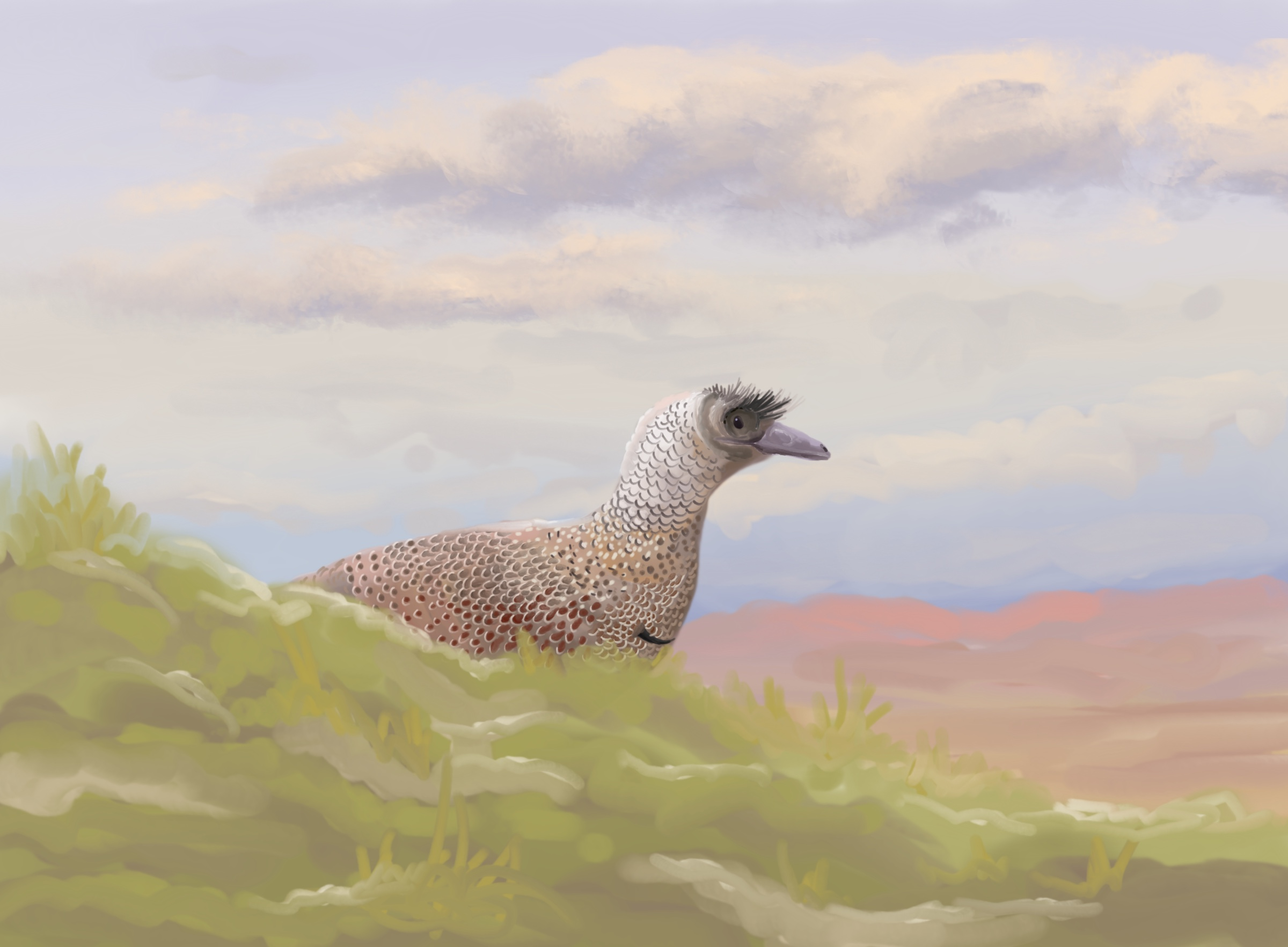
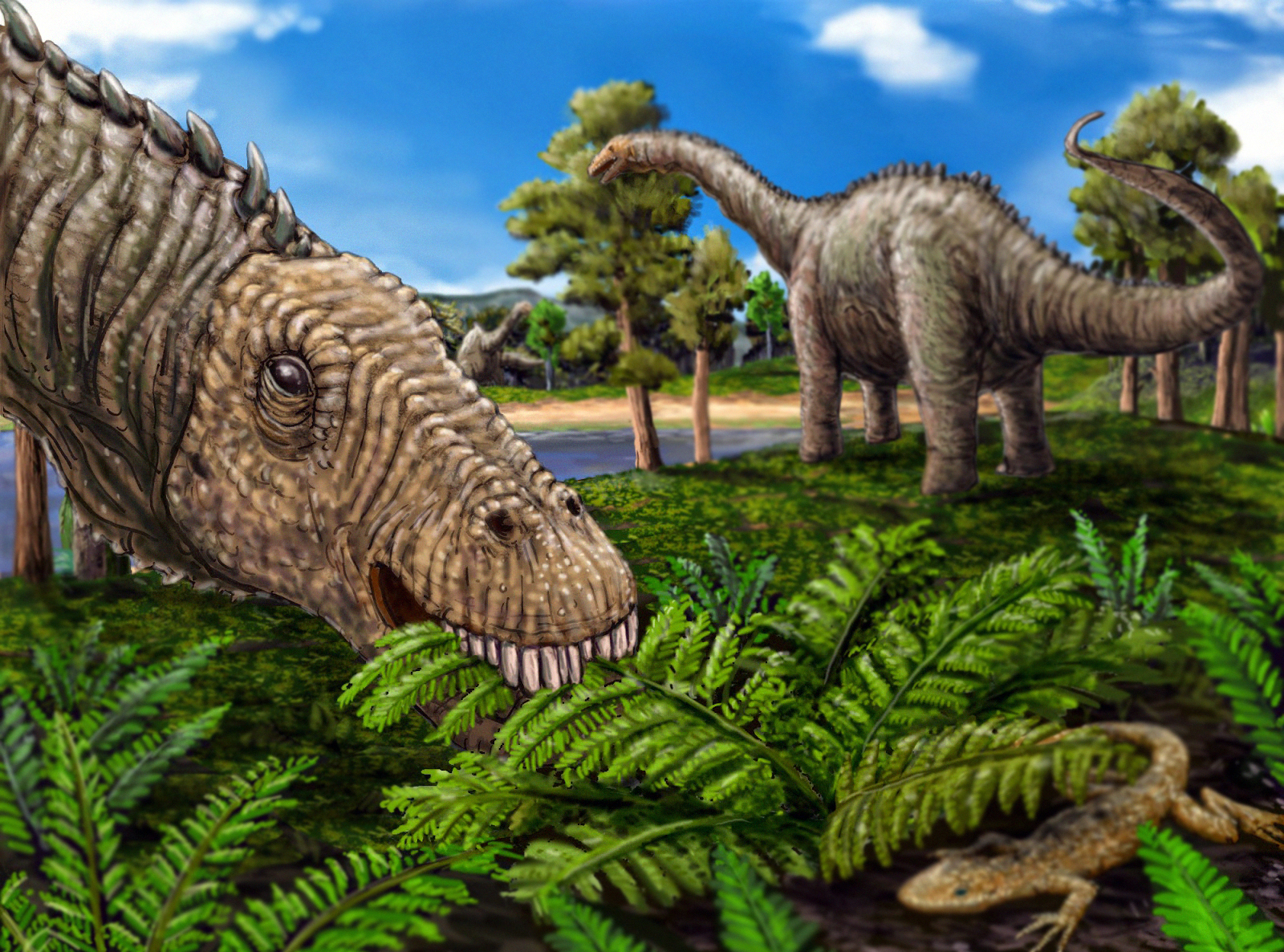
Life restorations of the alvarezsaurid Parviscursor and the titanosaur Quaesitosaurus, two Baruungoyot dinosaurs

Fossil remains of many vertebrates have been found in various layers of the Baruungoyot Formation. Most notably, dinosaurs are some of the most abundant, with many species having been described. Maniraptoran theropods are especially common, including dromaeosaurids (Hulsanpes, Kuru, Natovenator, and Shri devi), oviraptorids (Conchoraptor, Heyuannia and Nemegtomaia), alvarezsaurids (Ceratonykus, Jaculinykus, Khulsanurus, Ondogurvel, and Parvicursor), and birds (Gobipipus, Gobipteryx and Hollanda). Remarkably, Harenadraco is the first troodontid known from this formation, despite the fact that the Nemegt and Djadochta Formations—the other two similarly aged geological formations in the Mongolian Nemegt Basin—both preserve multiple troodontid taxa.

Several non-theropod dinosaurs are also present, including the titanosaurian sauropod (Quaesitosaurus), ankylosaurids (Saichania, Tarchia and Zaraapelta), protoceratopsids (Bagaceratops and Breviceratops), and a pachycephalosaurid (Tylocephale).

Non-dinosaurian animals from the formation include several fossil fish, amphibians, turtles, and many lizards and mammals (including djadochtatheriids, eutherians, multituberculates, and tribosphenidans).
