= Guegoolithus =

Guegoolithus Temporal range: Early Cretaceous

Egg fossil classification
- Basic shell type: †Dinosauroid-spherulitic
- Oofamily: †Spheroolithidae
- Oogenus: †Guegoolithus; Moreno-Azanza et al., 2014

Oospecies
- †G. turolensis Amo-Sanjuán et al., 2000 (type)

Oogenus of fossil egg

Guegoolithus is an oogenus of fossil egg from the early Cretaceous of Spain. It is classified in the oofamily Spheroolithidae, and was probably laid by an ornithopod dinosaur.

== Distribution ==
Guegoolithus is known from the Early Cretaceous of Spain. It is common in the Maestrazgo Basin, dating to the lower Barremian. Fossils have been found in the Blesa, El Castellar, Camarillas, and Mirambel Formations. It has also been found at the slightly older El Hocajo, a part of the Cameros Basin which dates to the Valanginian or Hauterivian ages, up to 7 million years older than the Maestrazgo specimens.

== Description ==
Guegoolithus is known from over 400 fossil eggshell fragments, but no complete eggs have been found. They are very thin for spheroolithids, ranging from 0.42 to 1.5 mm in thickness. The wide range of eggshell thickness is partially due to erosion on the inner and outer surfaces of the fragments. The size and shape of the complete egg is unknown.

Like other types of dinosaur eggs, the shell of Guegoolithus is made up of tightly packed crystalline units. The shell is single-layered, but the shell units appear to have two distinct layers because they exhibit a radiating acicular crystal structure near the base (the inner edge of the eggshell), but form a tabular ultrastructure on the upper third of the eggshell. The surface of the eggshell exhibits sagenotuberculate ornamentation (nodes and ridges forming a net-like pattern, with pits and grooves in between). It has a prolatocanaliculate pore system, similar to Spheroolithus, which means that the pores are irregularly shaped and vary in width along their length. Also like Spheroolithus, it has a prolatospherulitic morphotype, with eggshell units fused together and horizontal growth lines on the lower portion of the eggshell. Guegoolithus has much more prominent ornamentation that Spheroolithus, and a thinner eggshell than most Spheroolithus species.

== History ==
Guegoolithus was first discovered in 2000 by Spanish paleontologists Olga Amo-Sanjuán, José Ignacio Canudo, and Gloria Cuenca-Bescós, though it was described as an oospecies of Macroolithus. In 2008, a paper suggested that "M." turolensis be used as an index fossil for fossil sites in the Sistema Ibérico, because they are easily identifiable and always found in rocks of Hauterivian-Barremian age. An analysis in 2014 by Miguel Moreno-Azanza, José Ignacio Canudo, and José Manuel Gasca found that in fact, "M." turolensis is not an elongatoolithid, but instead belongs in Spheroolithidae, and named a new oogenus for it: Guegoolithus. In 2016, Moreno-Azanza and several of his colleagues reported the discovery of a new fossil site in La Rioja, Spain, which included eggs assigned to Guegoolithus. Since this site is somewhat older than the Barremian age of the previously reported Guegoolithus fossils, Moreno et al. rejected the idea of using them as index fossils.

== Classification ==
While it was previously considered an oospecies of Macroolithus in the oofamily Elongatoolithidae, Guegoolithus is now considered a spheroolithid because of the similarities of microstructure, ultrastructure, and ornamentation. It contains a single oospecies: G. turolensis. Relationships within Spheroolithidae are not well known because of the unclear definitions of Spheroolithus and Speroolithidae.

== Paleobiology ==
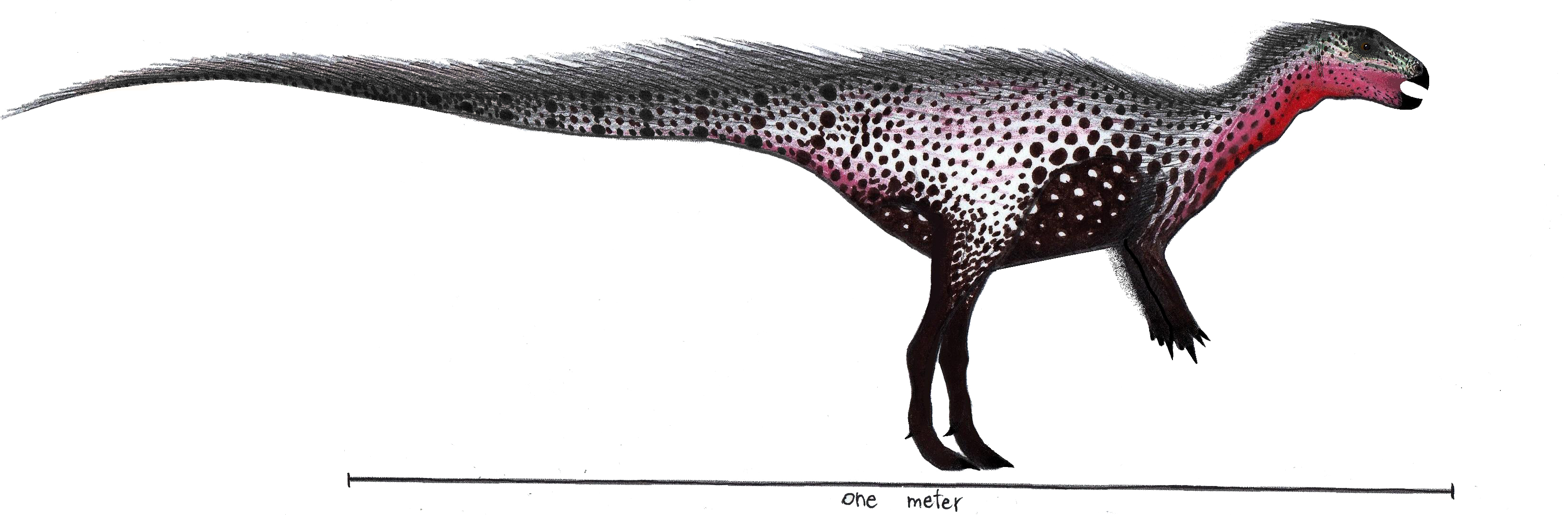
Life restoration of Gideonmantellia, a candidate for a parent of Guegoolithus.

Guegoolithus is classified as a spheroolithid, which would indicate it was laid by an ornithopod dinosaur. It is very similar to the eggs of Maiasaura peeblesorum and other hadrosaurs, but these were not common in Europe during the Early Cretaceous. G. turolensis is most likely laid by a closely related ornithopods. Styracosterns (a clade of ornithopods that includes hadrosaurs and their close relatives) are, like G. turolensis, incredibly common in the lower Cretaceous of Spain. Given that fossils of Guegoolithus span a larger time period than is likely for a single species, the fossils probably represent many different styracostern species with structurally indistinguishable eggshells. Because Guegoolithus remained unchanged for upwards of 5 million years and it is very similar to the late Cretaceous spheroolithids, Moreno-Azanza et al. (2017) concluded that the nesting behavior of hadrosaurs and their close relatives remained unchanged for 80 million years. The eggshell structure is apparently designed to be easily broken from the inside, indicating that these dinosaurs were altricial.

Its reclassification outside of Elongatoolithidae implies that no elongatoolithids are known from the early Cretaceous of Europe. However, elongatoolithids have been reported from the Late Cretaceous of France.
