= Parvoolithus =

Parvoolithus Temporal range: Campanian ~84–70 Ma

Egg fossil classification
- Domain: Eukaryota
- Kingdom: Animalia
- Phylum: Chordata
- Class: Aves
- Oogenus: †Parvoolithus; Mikhailov, 1996

Oospecies
- P. tortuosus

Oogenus of Mongolian fossil eggs

Parvoolithus is an oogenus of Mongolian fossil eggs from the Campanian Barun Goyot Formation. They are known from a single small, smooth egg, which cannot be assigned to any known oofamily. It is very similar to the eggs of modern birds in many aspects; in fact, a cladistic analysis by Zelenitsky and Therrien found it to be a sister taxon to the guinea fowl (genus Numida), indicating that they represent the eggs of birds, rather than a non-avialan theropod.
