= Manrak Formation =

Geologic formation in Kazakhstan

- Stratigraphic range: Campanian; ~80–75 Ma
- Type: Geological formation

Lithology
- Primary: Sandstone, claystone

Location
- Coordinates: 47.7°N 84.1°E
- Approximate paleocoordinates: 43.1°N 74.4°E
- Region: Shyghys Qazaqstan, Aqmola
- Country: Kazakhstan
- Manrak Formation (Kazakhstan)

The Manrak Formation (Russian: Manrakskaya Svita) is a Campanian geologic formation in Kazakhstan. Fossil dinosaur eggs have been reported from the formation.

== See also ==
- List of dinosaur-bearing rock formations
  - List of stratigraphic units with dinosaur trace fossils
    - Dinosaur eggs
