= Gobipipus =

Gobipipus Temporal range: Middle Campanian, 80–76 Ma

Scientific classification
- Kingdom: Animalia
- Phylum: Chordata
- Class: Reptilia
- Clade: Dinosauria
- Clade: Saurischia
- Clade: Theropoda
- Clade: Avialae
- Clade: †Enantiornithes
- Genus: †Gobipipus; Kurochkin, Chatterjee, & Mikhailov, 2013

Type species
- †Gobipipus reshetovi Kurochkin, Chatterjee, & Mikhailov, 2013

Extinct genus of birds

Gobipipus ("Gobi Desert chick") is a genus of enantiornithine bird. It lived during the middle Campanian stage of the Upper Cretaceous around 80 to 76 million years ago in what is now Mongolia. It is known from an incomplete embryonic individual that was found during a joint Russian-Mongolian Expedition to the Barun Goyot Formation of the Gobi Desert.
