= Karol Sabath =

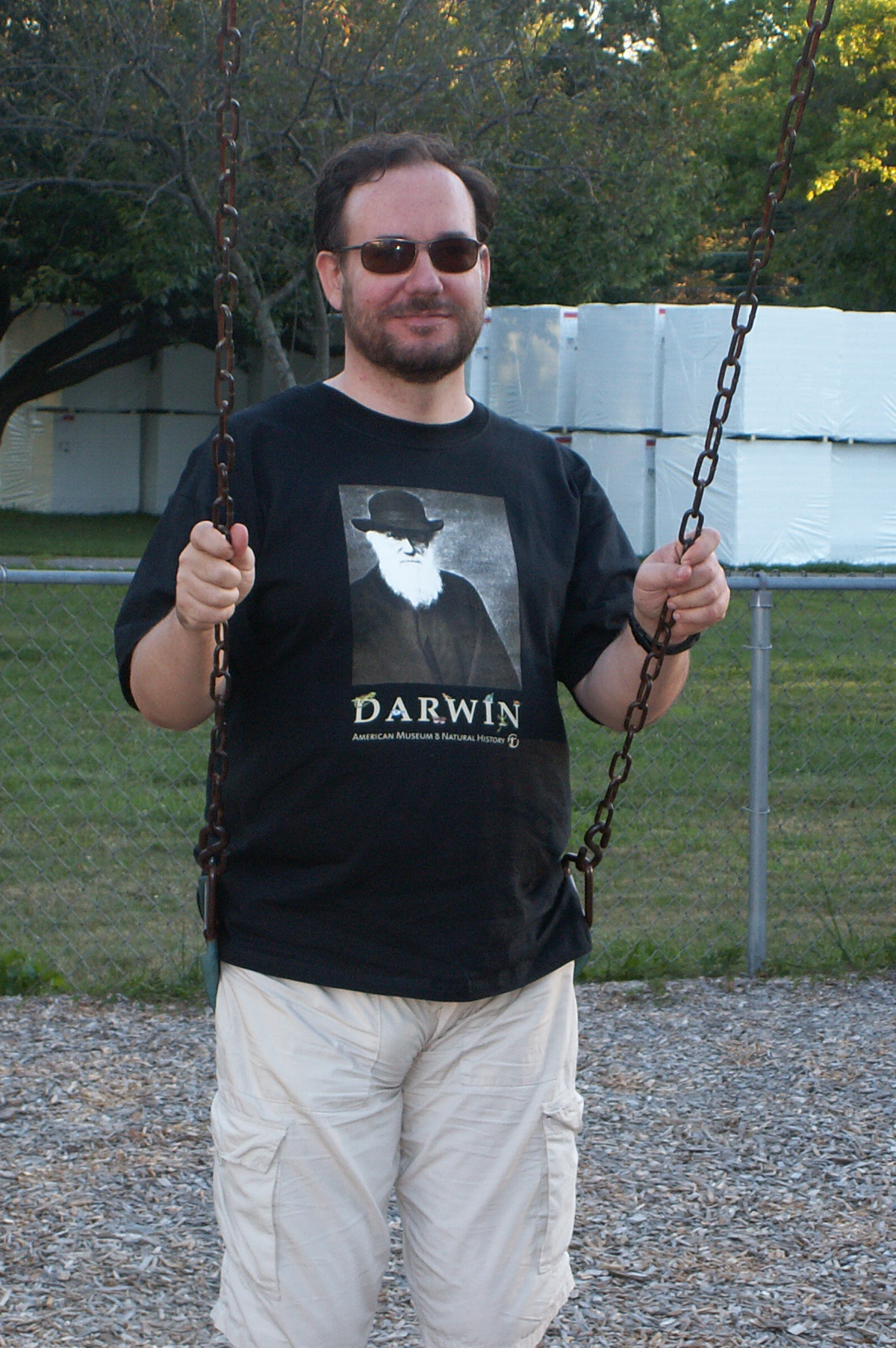
Karol Sabath

Karol Sabath (April 24, 1963 – October 10, 2007) was a Polish biologist, paleontologist and paleoartist. He was employed by the Instytut Paleobiologii of the Polska Akademia Nauk - Institute of Paleobiology, Polish Academy of Sciences, Warsaw. He also worked for National Geographic magazine, the Museum of the Polish Geological Institute, the European edition of Scientific American, and various other publishing houses in Poland. He authored many popular-science books for children, did translations, and wrote popular-science articles for Polish national newspapers. He was a scientific advisor for many popular-science events, including reconstructions of paleobiological environment and specimens (Baltow Jurassic Park).

He was a member of one of the Polish - Mongolian Paleobiological Expeditions to the Gobi Desert. His scientific interests included dinosaur eggs and babies, and dinosaur tracks. In 2003, Sabath and Jørn Hurum demonstrated that Tarbosaurus is a close relative of Alioramus, and not a species of Tyrannosaurus. This was based on supporting evidence for the hypothesis that tyrannosaurids originated in Asia, and then migrated to North America.

He was a co-founder of Polish Evolutionary Wortal ewolucja.org and Paleobiology Website paleontologia.pl

He was a Wikipedia Editor and DMOZ Editor.

== Publications ==
- Sabath, K. 1991. "Upper Cretaceous amniotic eggs from the Gobi Desert," Acta Palaeontologica Polonica, v. 36, p. 151-192.
- Mikhailov, K., Sabath, K., and Kurzanov, S., 1994. "Eggs and nests from the Cretaceous of Mongolia": in Carpenter, K., Hirsch, K.F., and Horner, J.R., eds., Dinosaur Eggs and Babies, Cambridge University Press, Cambridge, p. 88–115.
- Hurum J.H. & Sabath K. (2003). "Giant theropod dinosaurs from Asia and North America: Skulls of Tarbosaurus bataar and Tyrannosaurus rex compared," Acta Palaeontologica Polonica 48 (2), 161–190
- Currie, Philip J.; Hurum, Jørn H; & Sabath, Karol. (2003). "Skull structure and evolution in tyrannosaurid phylogeny," Acta Palaeontologica Polonica 48 (2): 227–234.
- Gierlinski, G. & Sabath, K. 2002: "A probable stegosaurian track from the Late Jurassic of Poland," Acta Palaeontologica Polonica 47, p. 561–564.
- Jacek Balerstet, Karol Sabath, 2004. Podstawy ewolucjonizmu (eng. "The Basics of Evolutionism") . Wyd. Operon.
