= Baruungoyot Formation =

Geological formation in Mongolia

Barun Goyot Formation
- Stratigraphic range: Maastrichtian
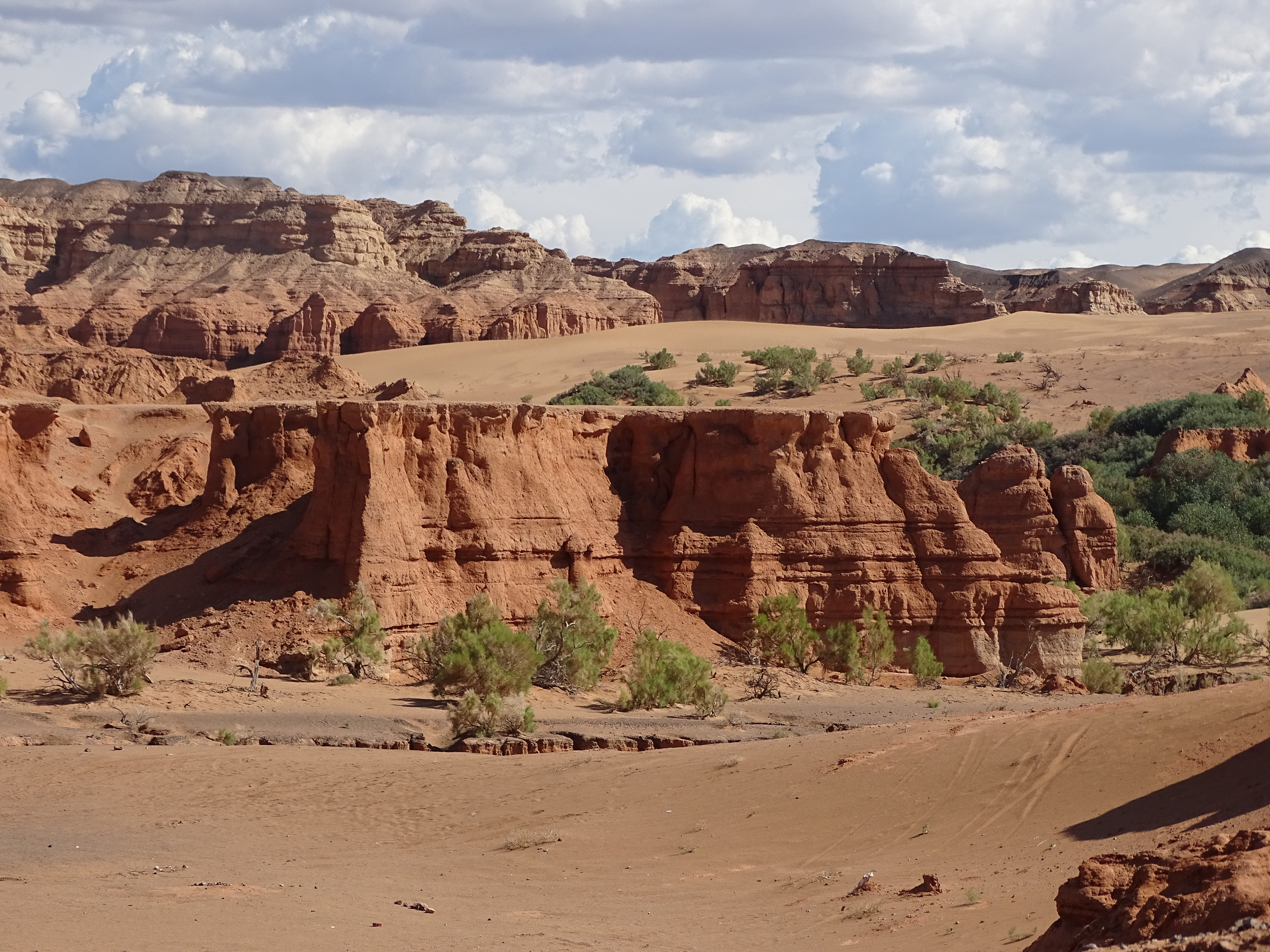
- Hermiin Tsav, a highly fossiliferous locality of the formation
- Type: Geological formation
- Underlies: Nemegt Formation
- Thickness: ca. 110 m (360 ft)

Lithology
- Primary: Sandstone

Location
- Coordinates: 43.5°N 99.8°E
- Approximate paleocoordinates: 40.5°N 89.5°E
- Region: Omnogov
- Country: Mongolia
- Extent: Gobi Desert

Type section
- Named for: Baruun
- Baruungoyot Formation (Mongolia)

The Baruungoyot Formation (also known as Barun Goyot) is a geological formation dating to the Late Cretaceous Period. It is located within and is widely represented in the Gobi Desert Basin, in the Ömnögovi Province of Mongolia.

== Description ==
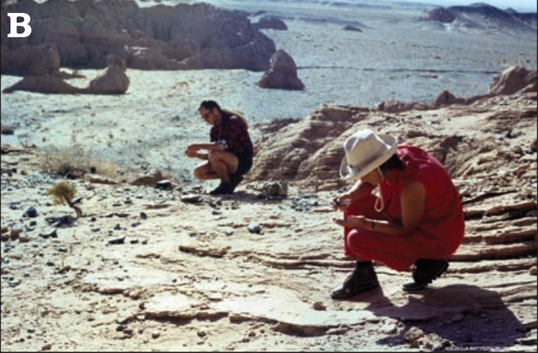
Khulsan in 1970

It was previously known as the Lower Nemegt Beds occurring beneath the Nemegt Formation. The stratotype of the Baruungoyot Formation is the Khulsan locality, east of Nemegt. At Nemegt, only the uppermost barungoyotian beds are visible. The Red Beds of Khermeen Tsav are also considered part of the Baruungoyot Formation. It is approximately 110 metres (360 ft) in thickness. The Baruungoyot Formation preserves an environment of sand dunes, created from wind-eroded rocks (aeolian dunes). The formation is considered Maastrichtian in age. It has no contact with the Djadochta Formation but the presence of many overlapping animals suggests they are at least partially coeval.

== Paleobiota of the Baruungoyot Formation ==
Color key: Taxon / Reclassified taxon / Taxon falsely reported as present / Dubious taxon or junior synonym / Ichnotaxon / Ootaxon / Morphotaxon	Notes; Uncertain or tentative taxa are in small text; ~~crossed out~~ taxa are discredited.

=== Lizards ===
Genus	Species	Location	Material	Notes	Images
Estesia	Estesia mongoliensis			An anguimorph	
Gobiderma	Gobiderma pulchrum			A Monstersaur	
Proplatynotia	Proplatynotia longirostrata				

=== Mammals ===
Genus	Species	Location	Material	Notes	Images
Asioryctes	A. nemegtensis			A eutherian.	
Barunlestes	B. butleri			A eutherian.	
Catopsbaatar	C. catopsaloides			A djadochtatheriid.	
Chulsanbaatar	C. vulgaris			A multituberculate.	
Deltatheridium	D. pretrituberculare			A tribosphenid.	
Nemegtbaatar	N. gobiensis			A multituberculate.	
Zofialestes	Z. longidens			A eutherian.	

=== Dinosaurs ===
==== Ornithiscians ====
===== Ankylosaurs =====
Genus	Species	Location	Material	Notes	Images
Saichania	S. chulsanensis	Hermiin Tsav II, Khulsan	[Three] skulls, mandibles, cervical vertebrae, dorsal vertebrae, ribs, sternum, scapulocoracoids, humerus, ulna, radius, manus, cervical half-rings, and osteoderms.	An ankylosaurid.	
Tarchia	T. kielanae	Hermiin Tsav II, Khulsan	[Two] partial skulls, osteoderms, and [three] undescribed specimens.	An ankylosaurid also known from a second species, T. teresae, which was found in the Nemegt Formation.	
Zaraapelta	Z. nomadis	Hermiin Tsav	A partial skull missing the rostrum.	An ankylosaurid known from a subadult individual.	
Ankylosauridae indet.	Indeterminate	Hermiin Tsav	Dorsal vertebrae, ribs, pectoral girdles, forelimbs, pelvic girdles, hindlimbs, and osteoderms.	An ankylosaurid known from a specimen preserved in a "resting posture".	

===== Ceratopsians =====
Genus	Species	Location	Material	Notes	Images
Bagaceratops	B. rozhdestvenskyi	Hermin Tsav, Khulsan	"Multiple specimens with partial to nearly complete skulls and skeletons."	A protoceratopsid. Gobiceratops, Lamaceratops, and Platyceratops are now considered synonyms of Bagaceratops.	
Breviceratops	B. kozlowskii	Khulsan	"Two skulls and partial skeleton remains."	A protoceratopsid.	
Udanoceratops?	Indeterminate	Baga Tariach	"Partial juvenile specimen."	A giant leptoceratopsid.	

===== Pachycephalosaurs =====
Genus	Species	Location	Material	Notes	Images
Tylocephale	T. gilmorei	Khulsan	"Partial skull."	A pachycephalosaurid.	

==== Sauropods ====
Genus	Species	Location	Material	Notes	Images
Faveoloolithus	F. ningxiaensis	Hermiin Tsav, Ikh Shunkht, Ologoy Ulan Tsav	"Eggs, egg clutches and shells."	Eggs probably laid by a sauropod.	
Quaesitosaurus	Q. orientalis	Shar Tsav	"Partial skull."	A titanosaur.	

==== Theropods ====
An undescribed tyrannosaurid specimen is known from the formation.

===== Alvarezsaurs =====
Genus	Species	Location	Material	Notes	Images
Ceratonykus	C. oculatus	Hermiin Tsav	"Partial skull with skeleton."	An alvarezsaurid.	
Jaculinykus	J. yaruui	Nemegt	A nearly complete articulated skeleton including much of the skull	A parvicursorine alvarezsaurid.	
Khulsanurus	K. magnificus	Khulsan	"Partial skeleton, including cervical and caudal vertebrae, scapulocoracoids, humerus, and pubis."	An alvarezsaurid.	
Ondogurvel	O. alifanovi	Nemegt	"Partial postcranial skeleton," including dorsal and sacral vertebrae and hip and leg bones.	An alvarezsaurid.	
Parvicursor	P. remotus	Khulsan	"Partial vertebrae, pelvic girdle and hindlimbs."	An alvarezsaurid	

===== Birds =====
Genus	Species	Location	Material	Notes	Images
Gobioolithus	G. major	Gilbent, Khulsan	"Five eggs."	Eggs probably laid by a bird.	
Gobioolithus	G. minor	Hermiin Tsav, Khulsan	"Eggs with embryonic remains."	Eggs probably laid by Gobipipus.	
Gobipipus	G. reshetovi	Hermiin Tsav, Khulsan	"Embryonic skulls and skeletons."	An enantiornithine.	
Gobipteryx	G. minuta	Hermiin Tsav, Khulsan	"Skulls and partial skeletons, and embryonic remains."	An enantiornithine. Also present in the Djadokhta Formation.	
Hollanda	H. luceria	Hermiin Tsav	"Partial hindlimbs from several specimens."	An ornithuromorph.	
Protoceratopsidovum	P. fluxuosum	Hermiin Tsav, Khulsan	"Clutch of 19 eggs and isolated eggs."	Eggs probably laid by a bird.	
Protoceratopsidovum	P. minimum	Ikh Shunkht	"Clutch of eggs."	Eggs probably laid by a bird.	
Protoceratopsidovum	P. sincerum	Hermiin Tsav	"Partial egg."	Eggs probably laid by a bird.	
Styloolithus	S. sabathi	Khulsan	"Partial eggs."	Eggs probably laid by a bird.	

===== Dromaeosaurids =====
Genus	Species	Location	Material	Notes	Images
Hulsanpes	H. perlei	Khulsan	Partial foot and skull bone	A halszkaraptorine	
Kuru	K. kulla	Khulsan	"Fragmentary skeleton."	A dromaeosaurid.	
Natovenator	N. polydontus	Hermiin Tsav	Partial articulated skeleton with skull	A halszkaraptorine	
Shri	S. devi	Khulsan	"Articulated skeleton lacking skull."	A dromaeosaurid.	
Velociraptorinae indet.	Indeterminate	Hermin Tsav, Khulsan	Not specified.	A dromaeosaurid.	

===== Troodontids =====
Genus	Species	Location	Material	Notes	Images
Harenadraco	H. prima	Hermiin Tsav	Partial leg, foot, and hip bones	A troodontid	

===== Oviraptorosaurs =====
Genus	Species	Location	Material	Notes	Images
Conchoraptor	C. gracilis	Hermin Tsav, Khulsan	"Multiple specimens with skulls and partial skeletons."	An oviraptorid. Also present in the Nemegt Formation.	
Heyuannia	H. yanshini	Hermiin Tsav	"Partial skulls and skeletons."	An oviraptorid. Originally identified as Ajancingenia and "Ingenia".	
Nemegtomaia	N. barsboldi	Nemegt	"Nesting specimen."	An oviraptorid. Also present in the Nemegt Formation.	

== Gallery ==
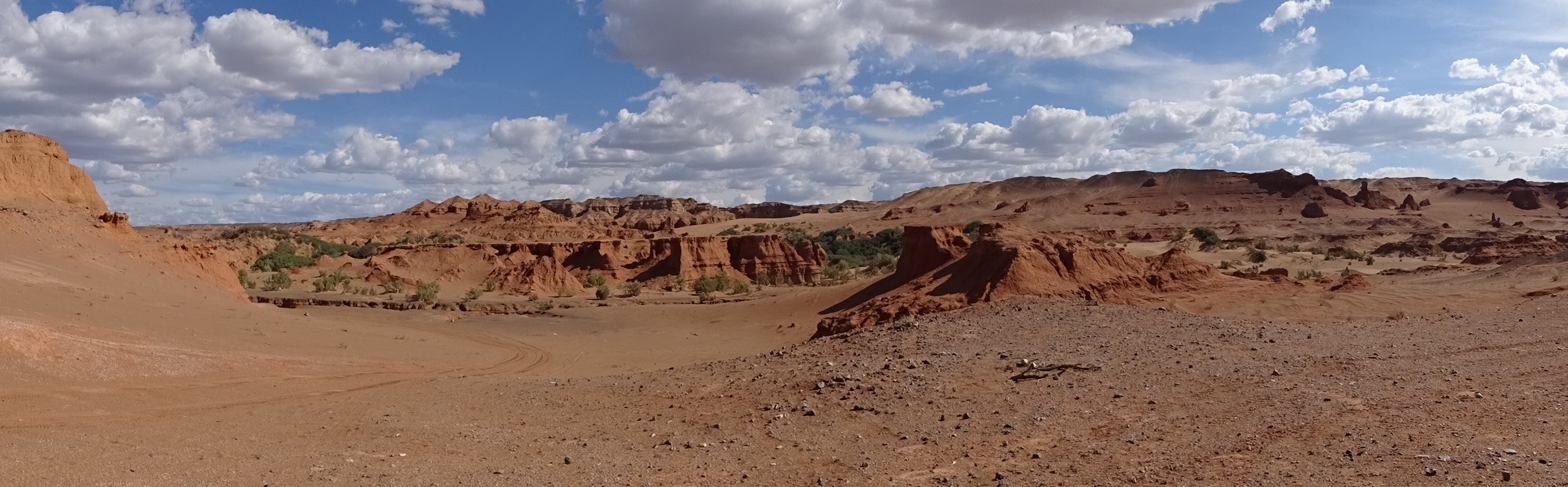
Panoramic view of the Hermiin Tsav locality of the Barun Goyot Formation
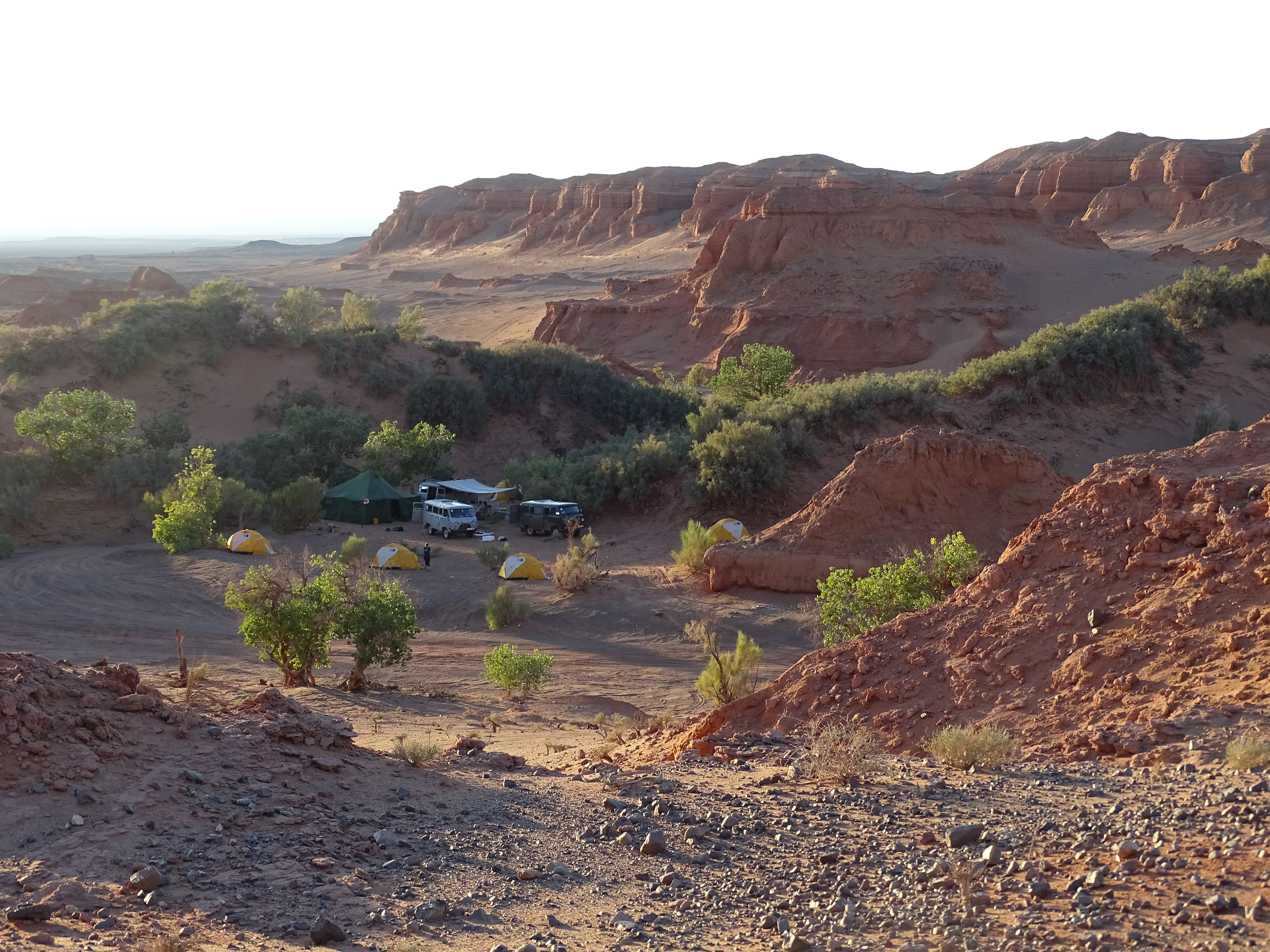

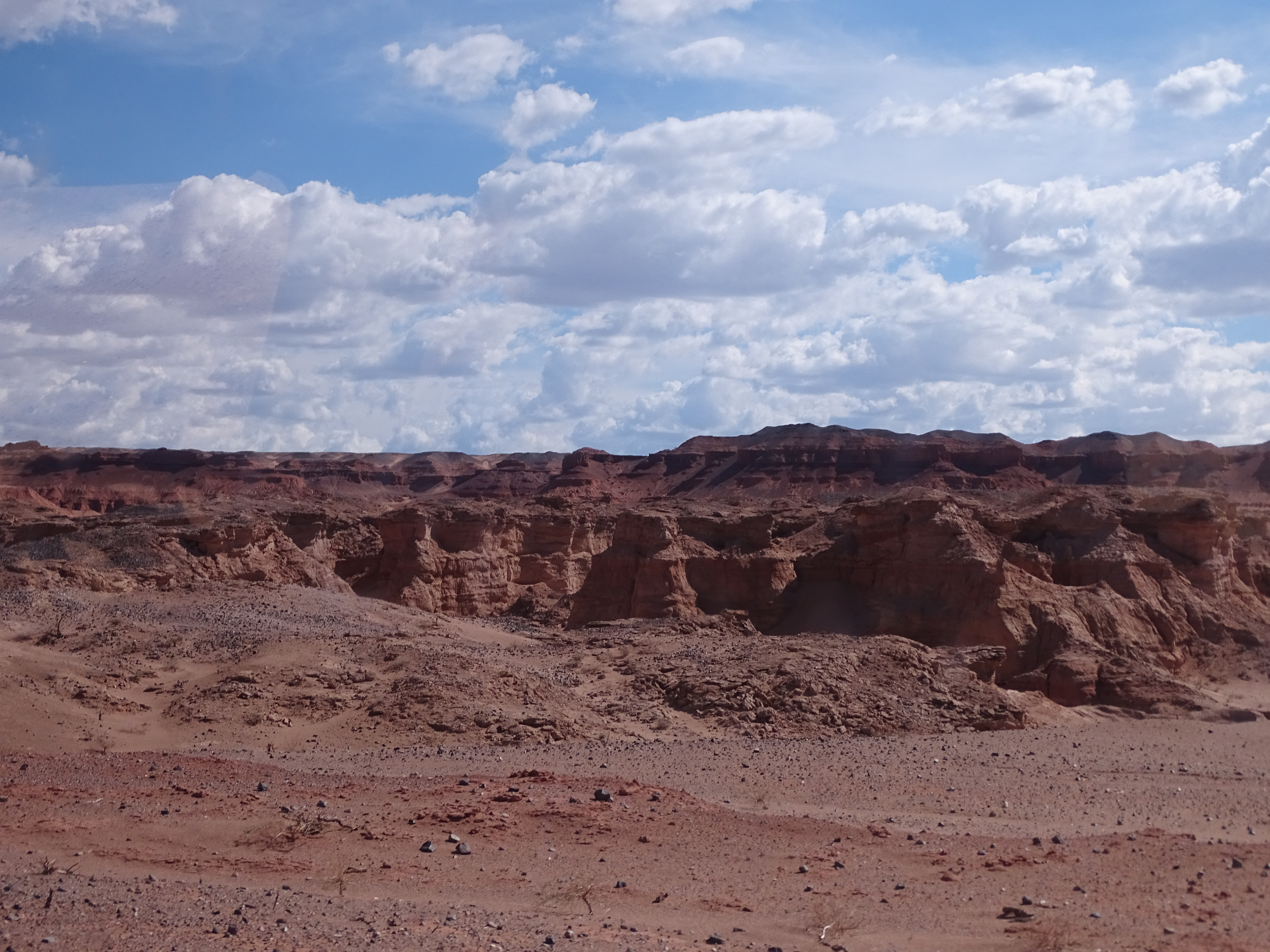

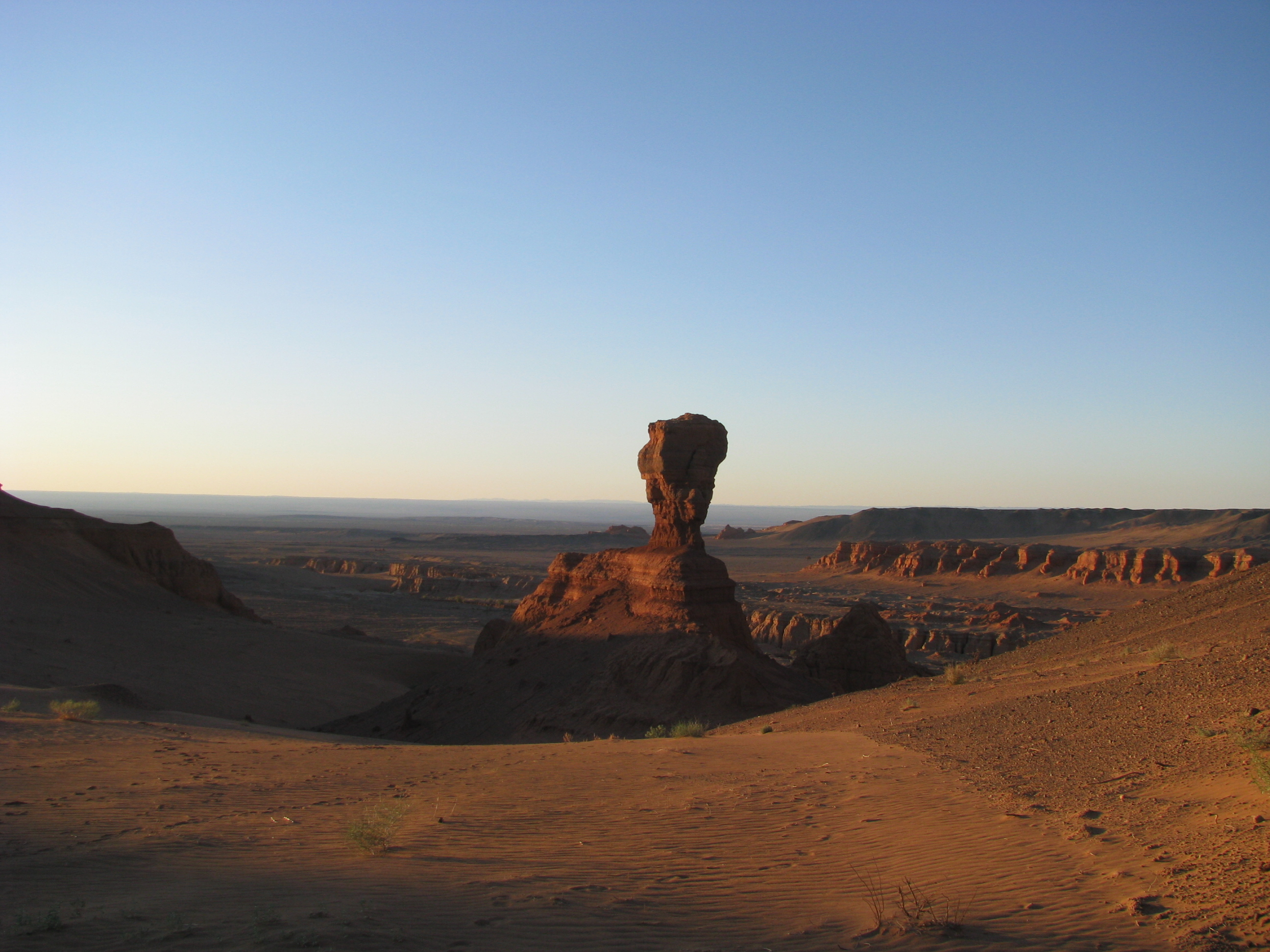

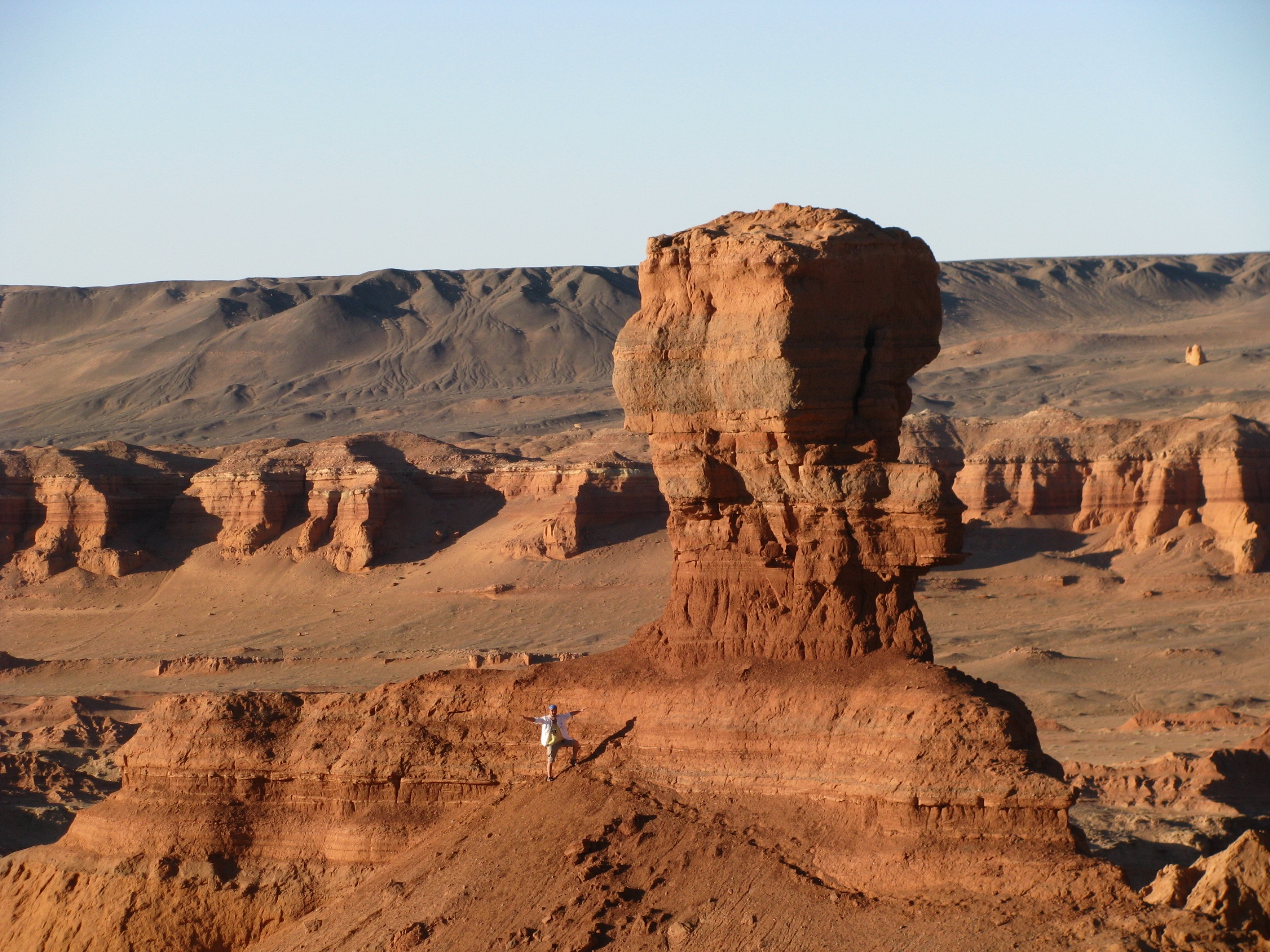

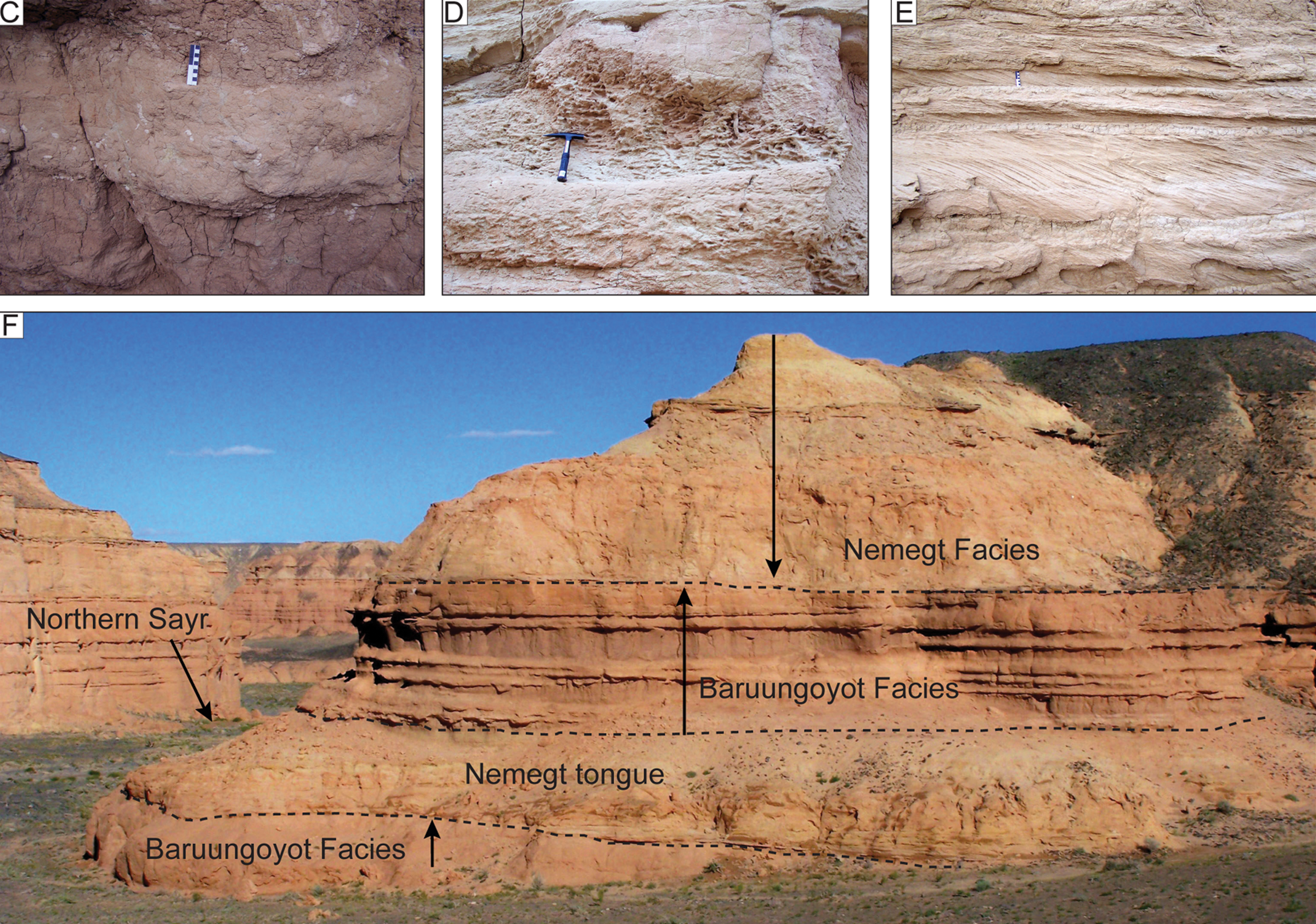

== See also ==
- List of dinosaur-bearing rock formations
- List of fossil sites (with link directory)
