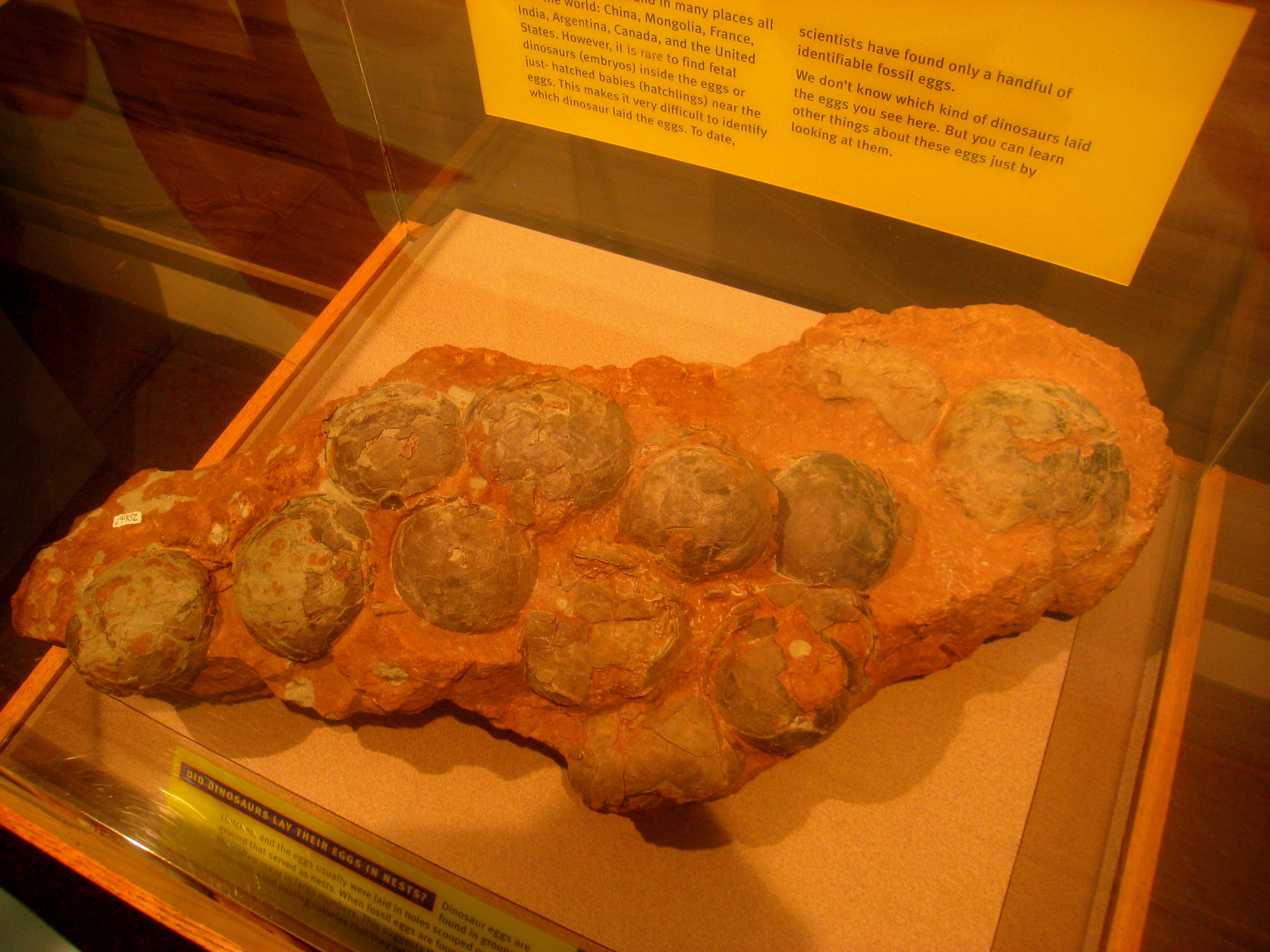
- Spheroolithus eggs from China

Egg fossil classification
- Basic shell type: †Dinosauroid-spherulitic
- Oofamily: †Spheroolithidae

Oogenera
- †Guegoolithus; †Spheroolithus; †Paraspheroolithus

= Spheroolithidae =

Spheroolithidae Temporal range: Early – Late Cretaceous ~136–66 Ma

Oofamily of dinosaur eggs

Spheroolithidae is an oofamily of dinosaur eggs. It contains Guegoolithus, Spheroolithus, and Paraspheroolithus. Like modern birds, the eggshell membrane formed before the calcareous part of the shell.

== See also ==
- List of dinosaur oogenera
