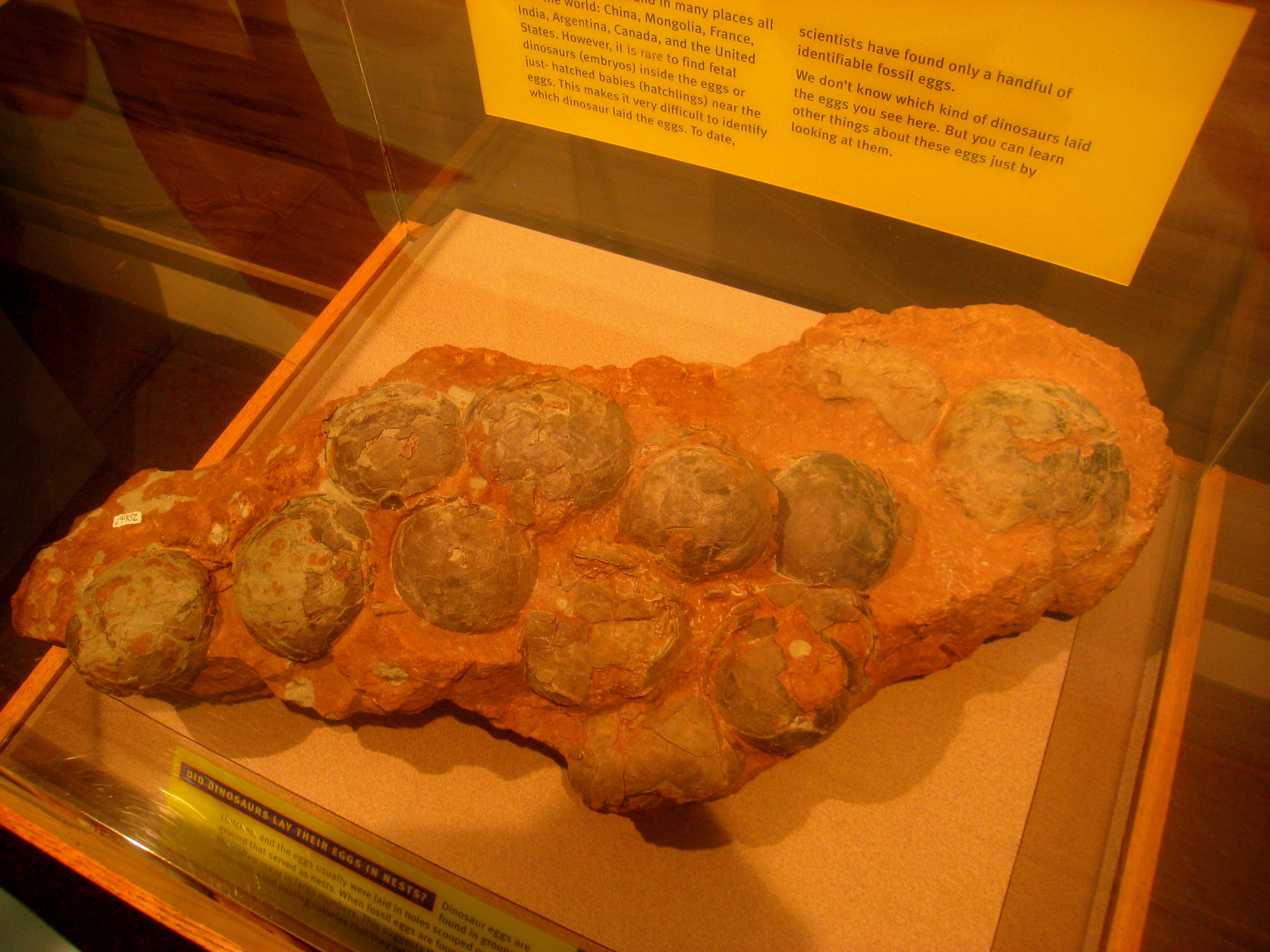
- Spheroolithus eggs from China

Egg fossil classification
- Basic shell type: †Dinosauroid-spherulitic
- Oofamily: †Spheroolithidae
- Oogenus: †Spheroolithus; Zhao, 1979

Synonyms
- Paraspheroolithus Zhao, 1979

= Spheroolithus =

Spheroolithus Temporal range: Late Cretaceous ~99.6–66 Ma

Dinosaur egg

Spheroolithus is an oogenus of dinosaur egg.

== Oospecies ==
The following species are described:

- Paraspheroolithus sanwangbacunensis
- Paraspheroolithus yangchengensis
- Spheroolithus albertensis
- Spheroolithus choteauensis
- Spheroolithus europaeus
- Spheroolithus irenensis
- Spheroolithus jincunensis
- Spheroolithus maiasauroides
- Spheroolithus megadermus
- Spheroolithus spheroides
- Spheroolithus tenuicorticus

== Distribution ==
Fossils of the oogenus were found in:

- Dinosaur Park and Oldman Formations, Alberta, Canada
- China
- Ohyamashimo Formation, Japan
- Cerro del Pueblo Formation (Difunta Group), Mexico
- Nemegt & Bayan Shireh Formations, Mongolia
- La Posa Formation (Tremp Group), Spain
- Two Medicine Formation, Montana and North Horn Formation, Utah, United States
- Lameta Formation, India

== Gallery ==
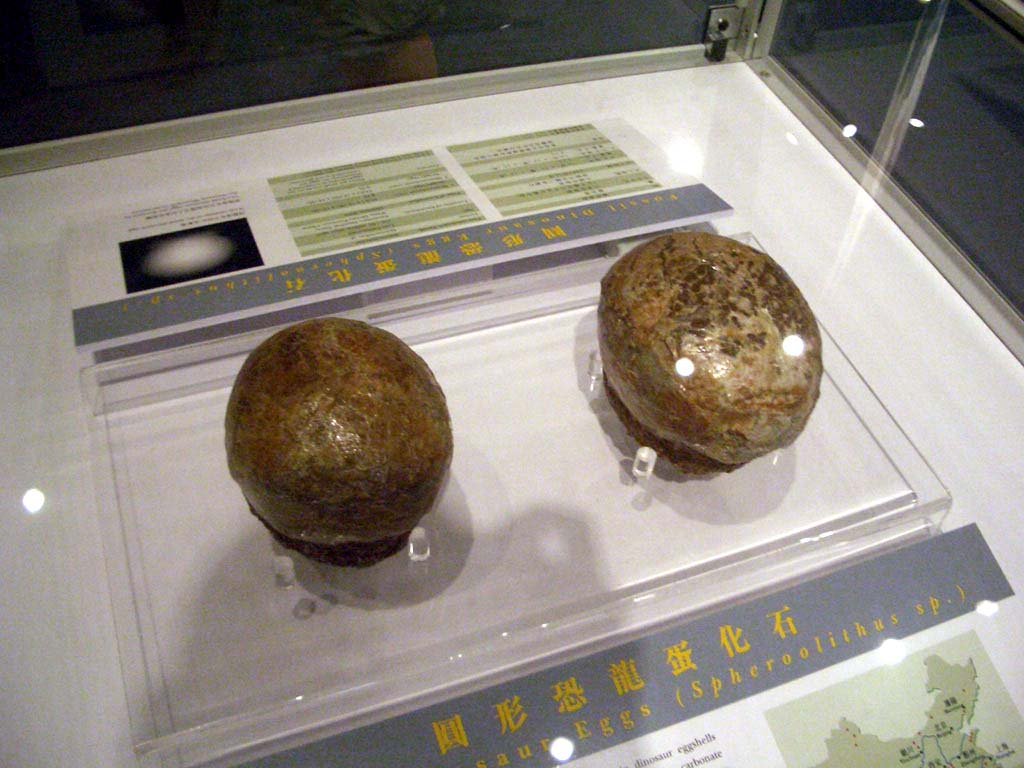
Spheroolithus sp. eggs

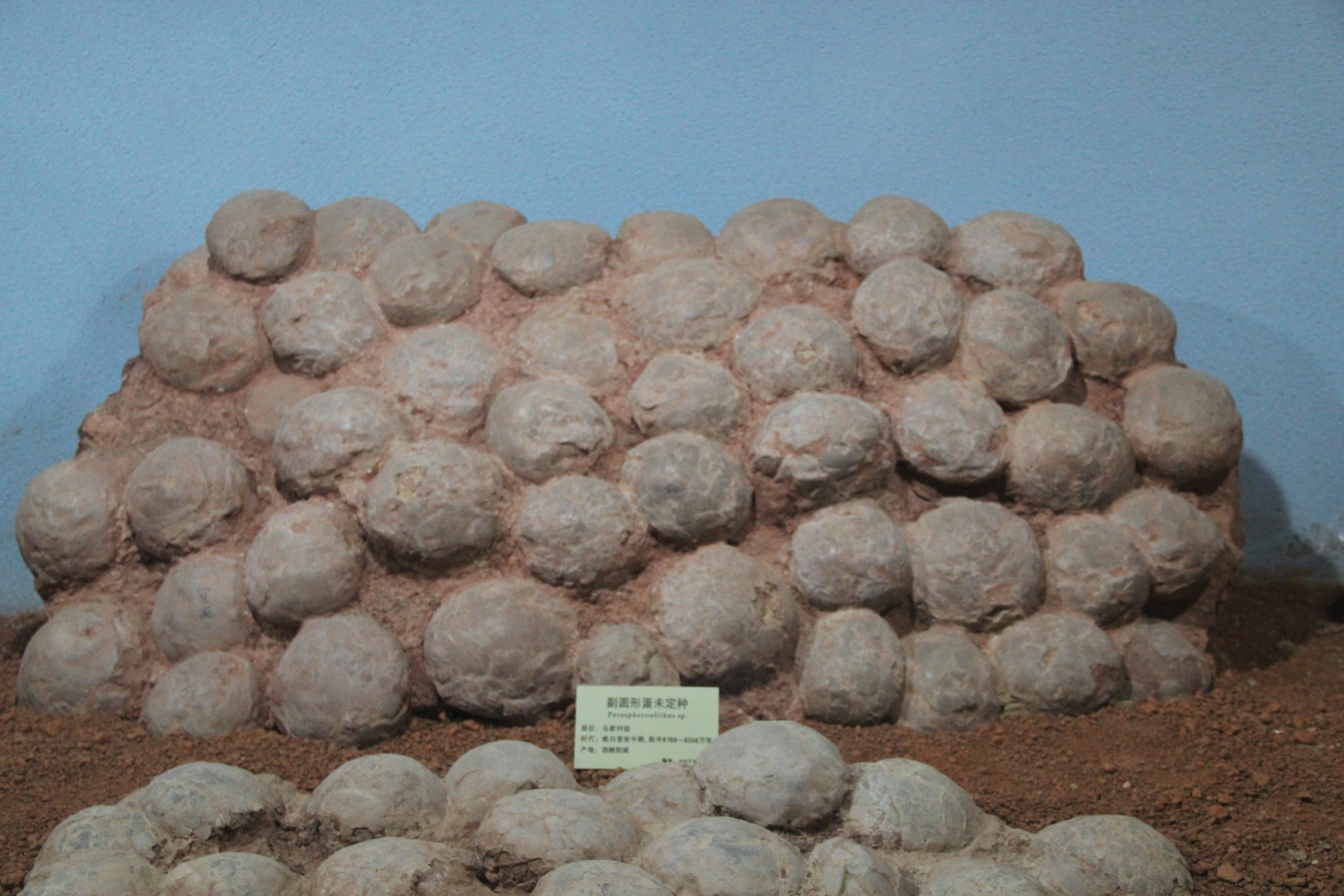
Paraspheroolithus eggs in Henan Geological Museum

== See also ==
- List of dinosaur oogenera
