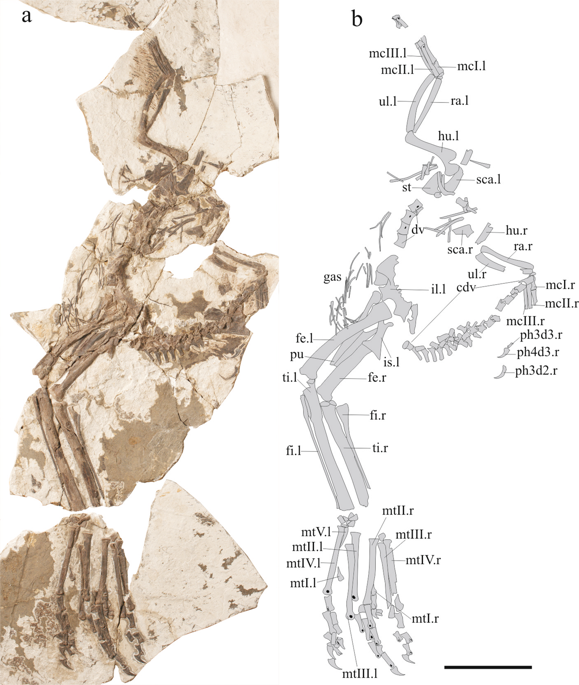
- Holotype specimen, photograph (left) and line drawing (right)

Scientific classification
- Kingdom: Animalia
- Phylum: Chordata
- Class: Reptilia
- Clade: Dinosauria
- Clade: Saurischia
- Clade: Theropoda
- Family: †Caudipteridae
- Genus: †Xingtianosaurus; Qiu et al., 2019

Type species
- †Xingtianosaurus ganqi Qiu et al., 2019

= Xingtianosaurus =

Xingtianosaurus Temporal range: Early Cretaceous, 125 Ma

Genus of theropod dinosaur

Xingtianosaurus is an extinct genus of oviraptorosaurian theropod dinosaur that lived in what is now China during the Early Cretaceous. The type and only species, X. ganqi, was named and described in 2019. It was placed in the Caudipteridae, alongside Caudipteryx and Similicaudipteryx.

== Discovery and naming ==
The holotype specimen of Xingtianosaurus ganqi, IVPP V13390, was recovered in the Dakangpu Beds of the Yixian Formation in Liaoning Province, China. The name Xingtianosaurus refers to Xingtian, a Chinese deity who continued to fight after being decapitated. This name references the skull-less holotype. The epithet ganqi refers to the weapon, a battle axe, that Xingtian wielded.

== Description ==
The holotype specimen is almost complete, missing only the skull, several vertebrae and the coracoids.
