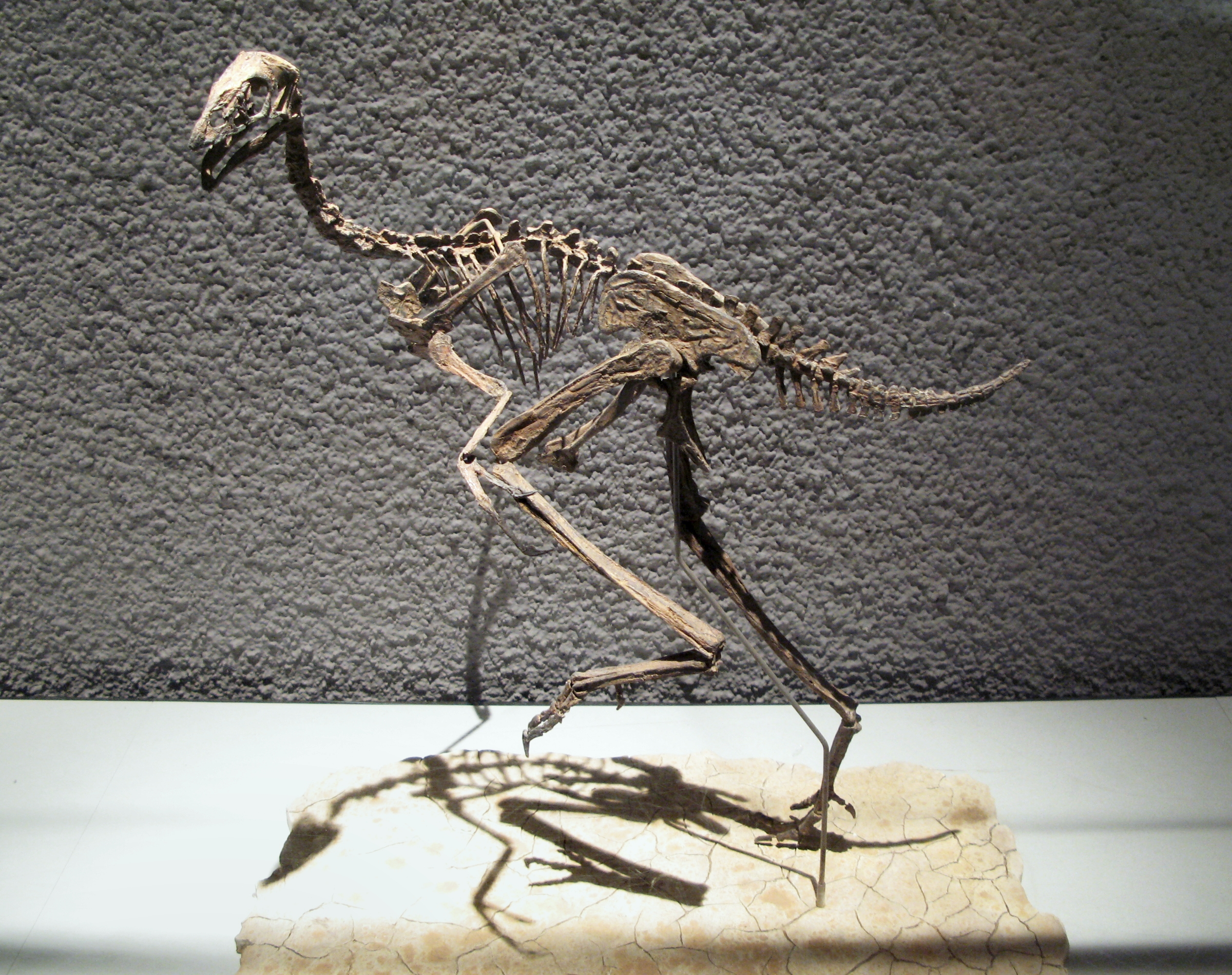
- Replica of a Caudipteryx zoui skeleton

Scientific classification
- Kingdom: Animalia
- Phylum: Chordata
- Class: Reptilia
- Clade: Dinosauria
- Clade: Saurischia
- Clade: Theropoda
- Clade: †Oviraptorosauria
- Family: †Caudipteridae; Zhou & Wang, 2000

Type species
- †Caudipteryx zoui Ji et al., 1998

Genera
- †Caudipteryx; †Similicaudipteryx; †Xingtianosaurus

Synonyms
- Caudipterygidae Osmólska, Currie & Barsbold, 2004

= Caudipteridae =

Caudipterids Temporal range: Early Cretaceous, 125–120 Ma

Extinct family of dinosaurs

Caudipteridae is an extinct family of oviraptorosaurian dinosaurs known from the Early Cretaceous of China. Found in the Yixian and Jiufotang Formations, the group existed between 125 and 120 million years ago. Distinguishing characteristics of this group have been indicated as including a unique dagger-shaped pygostyle (the bone at the tip of the tail in birds, used to anchor a "fan" of feathers). In 2015, the group was defined as "the most inclusive clade containing Caudipteryx zoui but not Oviraptor philoceratops and Caenagnathus collinsi".

The first caudipterid described was Caudipteryx zoui (named in 1998), though the family itself was not named until the discovery of a second species, Caudipteryx dongi, in 2000. Caudipteridae was restricted to the single genus Caudipteryx and was therefore monotypic, containing only a single type and often considered redundant. However, in 2008 Similicaudipteryx yixianensis was described and classified as a caudipterid.

== See also ==
- Timeline of oviraptorosaur research
