= Timeline of oviraptorosaur research =

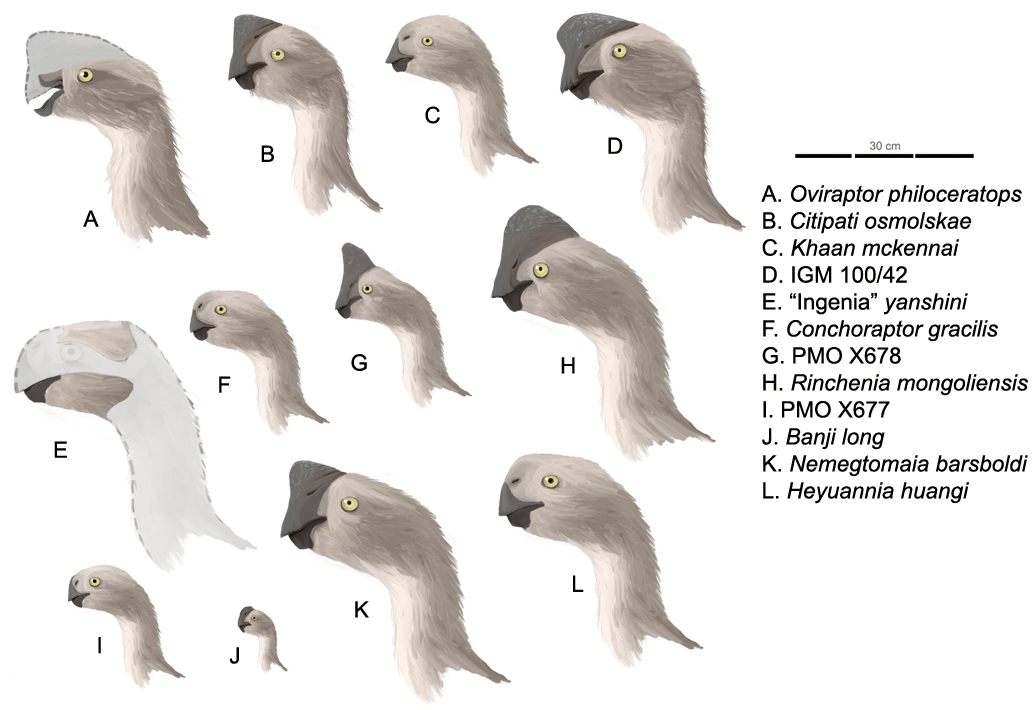
Restored profiles of various oviraptorids

This timeline of oviraptorosaur research is a chronological listing of events in the history of paleontology focused on the oviraptorosaurs, a group of beaked, bird-like theropod dinosaurs. The early history of oviraptorosaur paleontology is characterized by taxonomic confusion due to the unusual characteristics of these dinosaurs. When initially described in 1924 Oviraptor itself was thought to be a member of the Ornithomimidae, popularly known as the "ostrich" dinosaurs, because both taxa share toothless beaks. Early caenagnathid oviraptorosaur discoveries like Caenagnathus itself were also incorrectly classified at the time, having been misidentified as birds.

The hypothesis that caenagnathids were birds was questioned as early as 1956 by Romer, but not corrected until Osmolska formally reclassified them as non-avian dinosaurs in 1976. Meanwhile, the classification of Oviraptor as an ornithomimid persisted unquestioned by researchers like Romer and Steel until the early 1970s when Dale Russell argued against the idea in 1972. In 1976 when Osmolska recognized Oviraptor's relationship with the Caenagnathids, she also recognized that it was not an ornithomimid and reclassified it as a member of the former family. However, that same year Rinchen Barsbold argued that Oviraptor belonged to a distinct family he named the Oviraptoridae and he also formally named the Oviraptorosauria later in the same year.

Like their classification, the paleobiology of oviraptorosaurs has been subject to controversy and reinterpretation. The first scientifically documented Oviraptor skeleton was found lying on a nest of eggs. Because its powerful parrot-like beak appeared well-adapted to crushing hard food items and the eggs were thought to belonged to the neoceratopsian Protoceratops, oviraptorosaurs were thought to be nest-raiders that preyed on the eggs of other dinosaurs. In the 1980s, Barsbold proposed that oviraptorosaurs used their beaks to crack mollusk shells as well. In 1993, Currie and colleagues hypothesized that small vertebrate prey may have also been part of the oviraptorosaur diet. Not long after, fossil embryonic remains cast doubt on the popular reconstruction of oviraptorosaurs as egg thieves when it was discovered that the "Protoceratops" eggs that Oviraptor was thought to be "stealing" actually belonged to Oviraptor itself. The discovery of additional Oviraptor preserved on top of nests in lifelike brooding posture firmly established that oviraptorosaurs had been "framed" as egg thieves and were actually caring parents incubating their own nests.

== 20th century ==
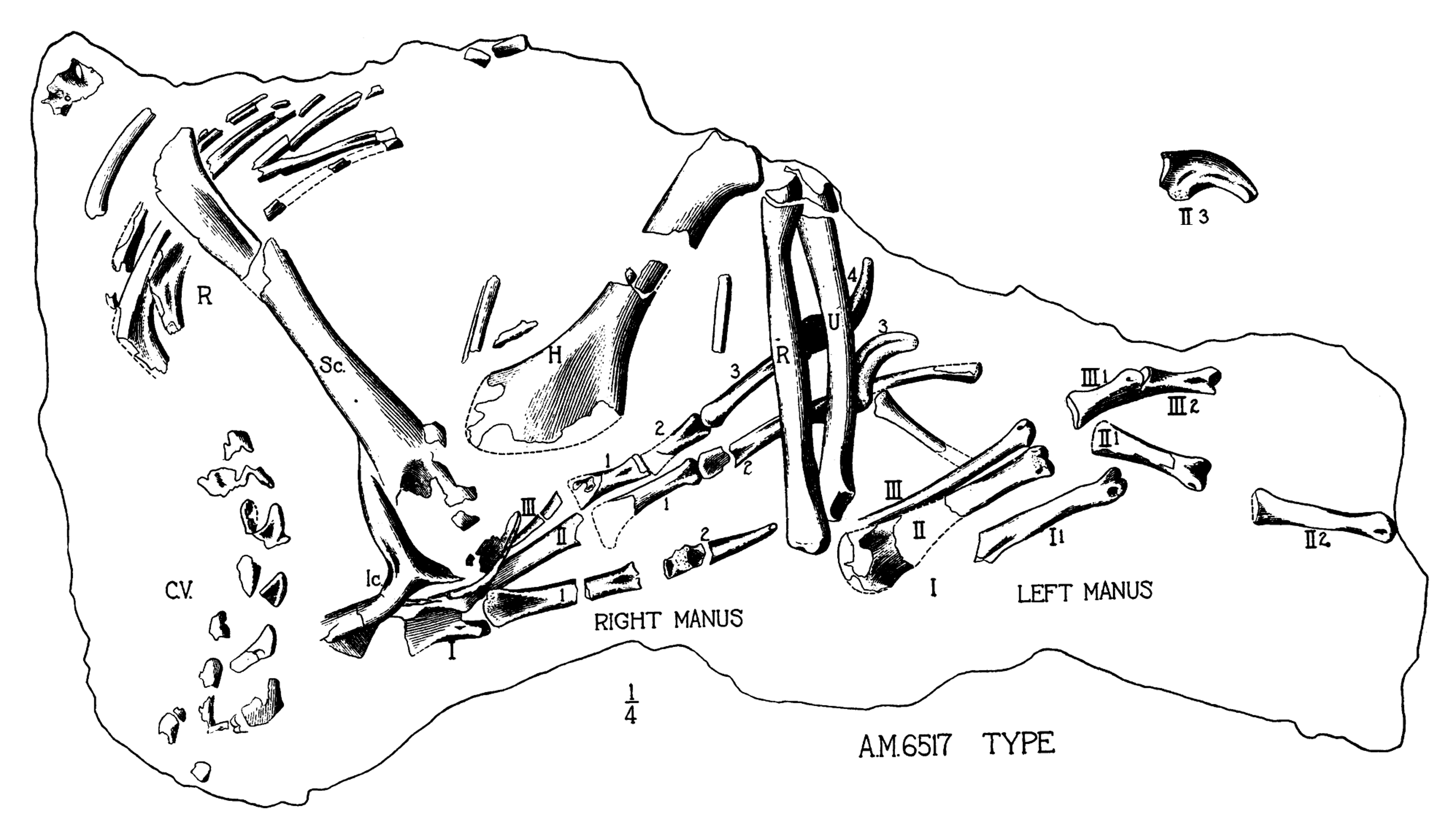
Drawing of the left arm and both hands of the Oviraptor type specimen AMNH 6517

=== 1920s ===
==== 1923 ====
- A specimen of the species that would come to be named Oviraptor philoceratops was found preserved on top of a nest of eggs.

==== 1924 ====
- Osborn described the new genus and species Oviraptor philoceratops. He classified it as an ornithomimid because it didn't have any teeth in its jaws and interpreted the genus as being adapted to a diet of eggs. Since a specimen was found preserved on top of a nest of eggs presumed to belong to Protoceratops, Osborn thought that it was smothered by a sandstorm while in the act of raiding the nest.

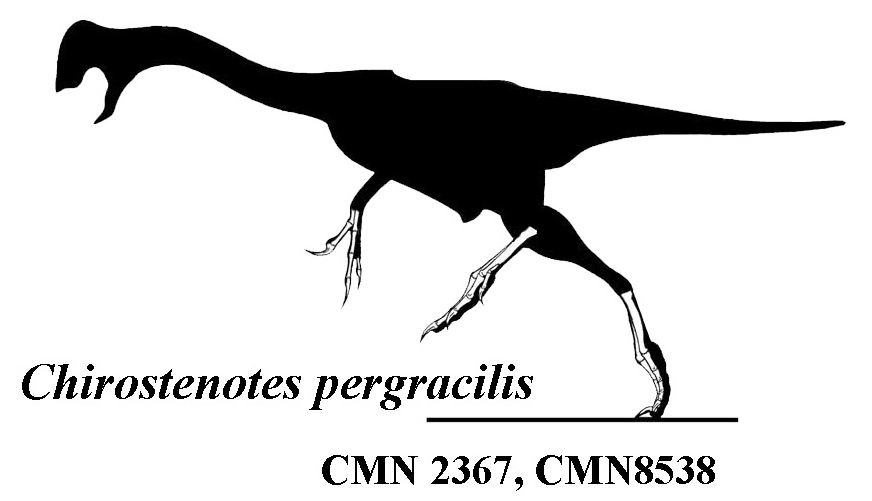
Skeletal reconstruction of Chirostenotes

- Gilmore described the new genus and species Chirostenotes pergracilis.

=== 1930s ===
==== 1932 ====
- C. M. Sternberg described the new genus and species Macrophalangia canadensis.

==== 1933 ====
- Parks described the new species Ornithomimus elegans and referred it to Chirostenotes.

=== 1940s ===
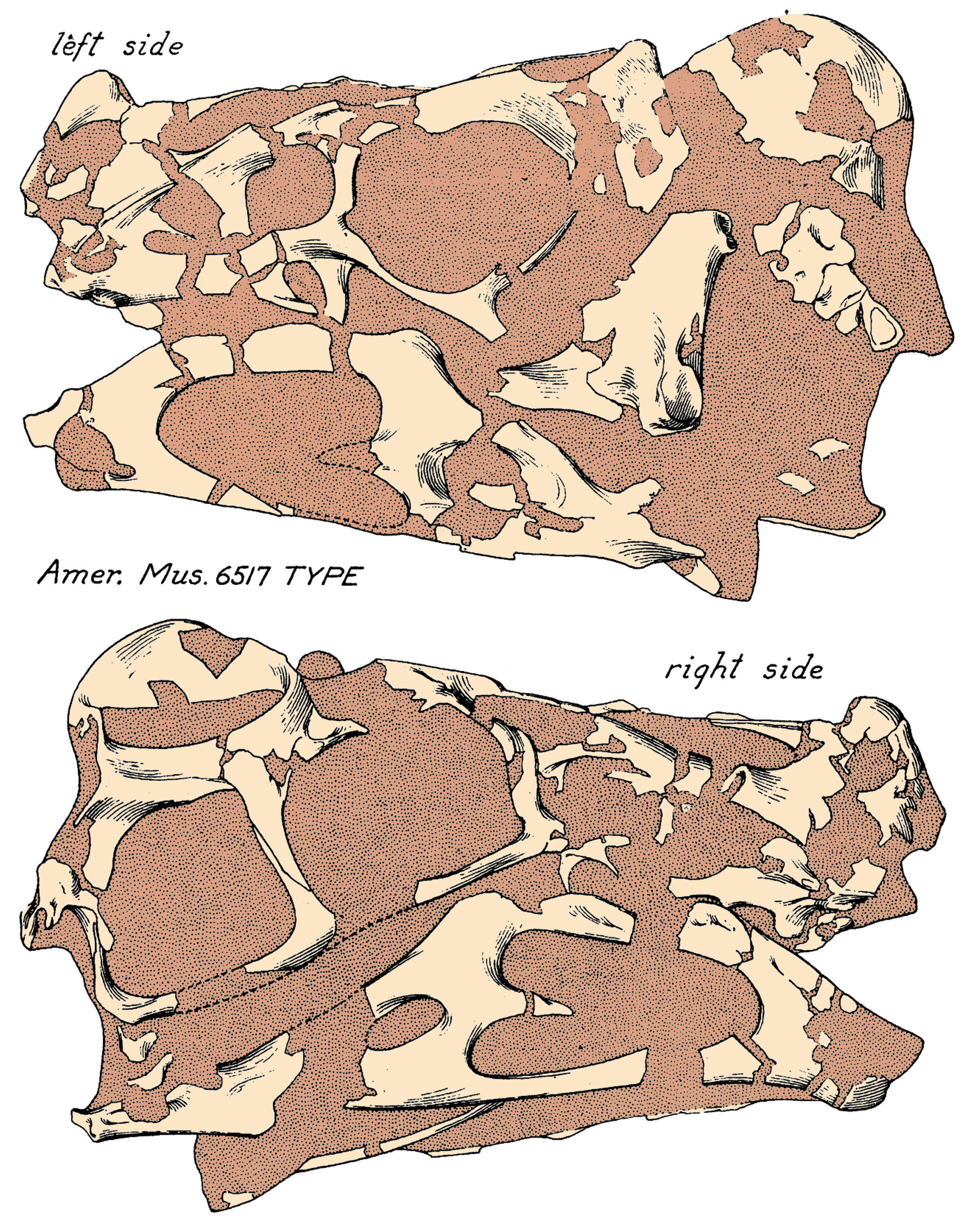
Drawing of the skull of Oviraptor, type specimen AMNH 6517

==== 1940 ====
- R. M. Sternberg described the new genus and species Caenagnathus collinsi and named the Caenagnathidae and Caenagnathoidea. He thought they were birds.

=== 1950s ===
==== 1956 ====
- Romer followed Osborn's original classification of Oviraptor as an ornithomimid. He also observed that caenagnathids had reptilian characteristics and may have been coelurosaurs.

=== 1960s ===
==== 1960 ====
- Wetmore questioned the hypothesis that caenagnathids were birds because their remains exhibit some reptilian traits.

==== 1966 ====
- Romer continued to follow Osborn's original classification of Oviraptor as an ornithomimid.

=== 1970s ===
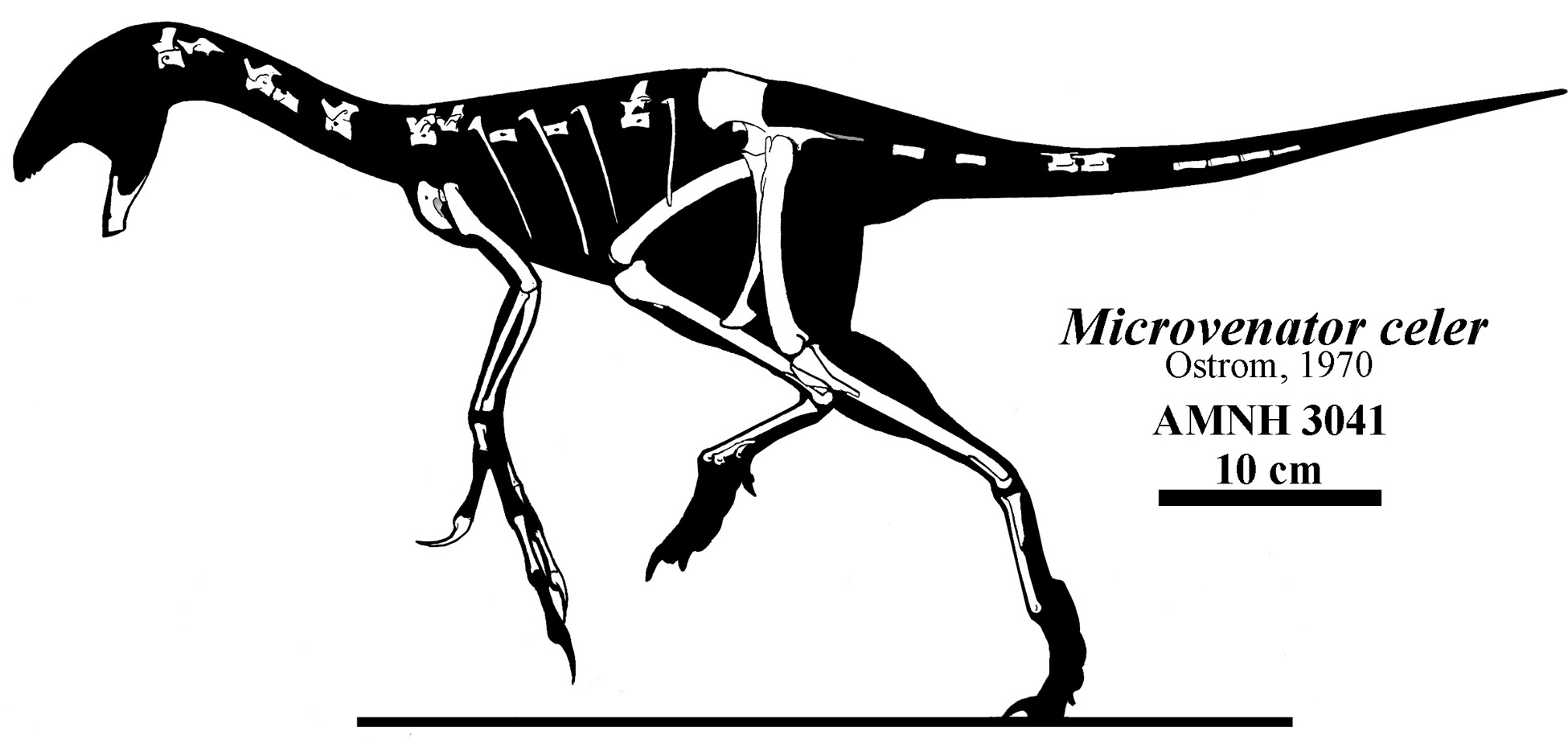
Skeletal reconstruction of Microvenator

==== 1970 ====
- Ostrom described the new genus and species Microvenator celer.
- Steel followed Osborn's original classification of Oviraptor as an ornithomimid. He also questioned the avian status of caenagnathids and proposed that they might actually be coelurosaurs instead.

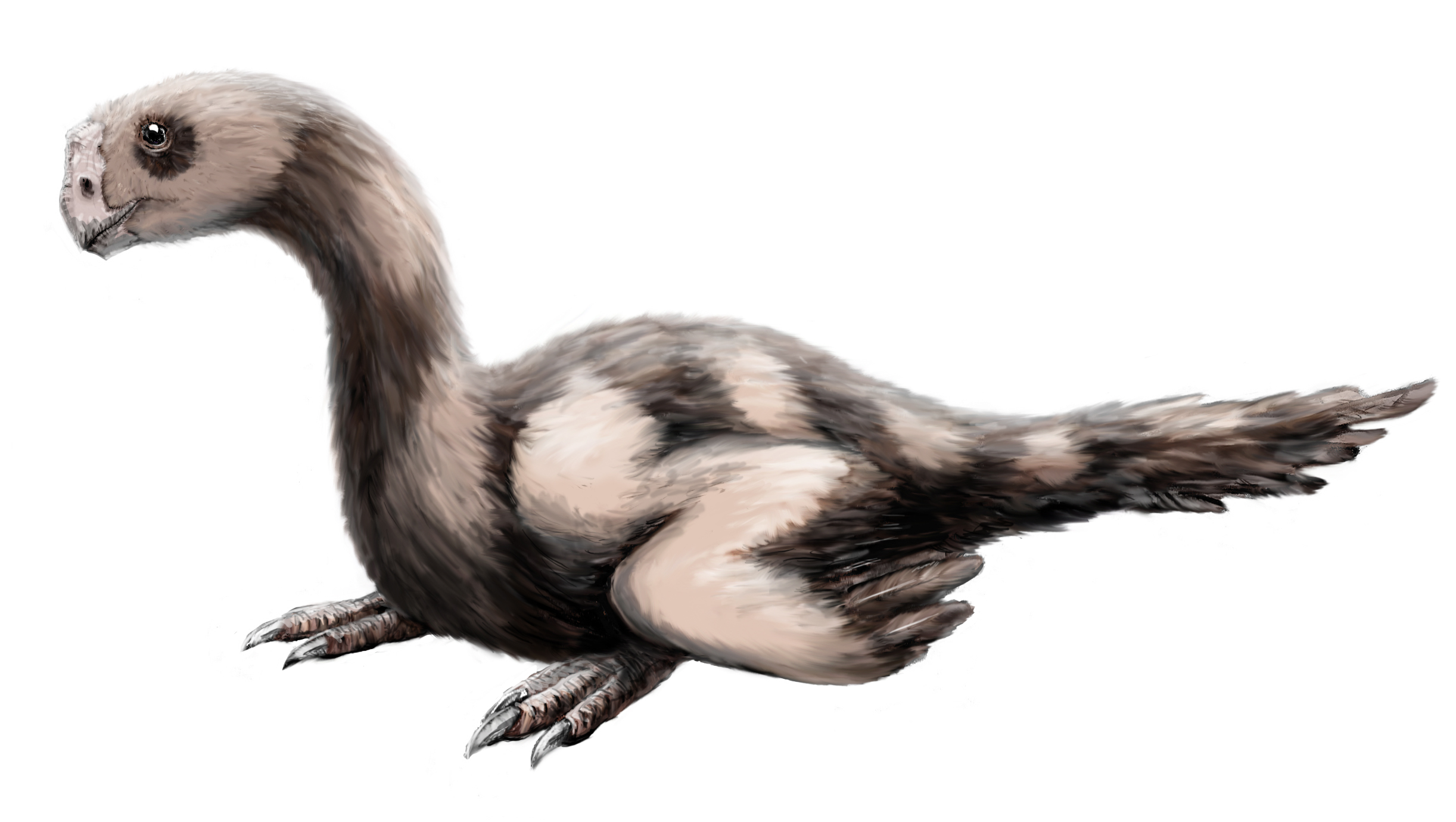
Artist's restoration of Microvenator

==== 1971 ====
- Cracroft named the new species Caenagnathus sternbergi. He thought it was a bird.

==== 1972 ====
- Russell argued against the classification of Oviraptor as an ornithomimid.

==== 1976 ====
- Osmolska recognized that caenagnathids were theropods and classified Oviraptor as a member of the family.
- Barsbold classified Oviraptor as a member of the new taxa Oviraptorinae and Oviraptoridae.
- Barsbold named the Oviraptorosauria.

=== 1980s ===
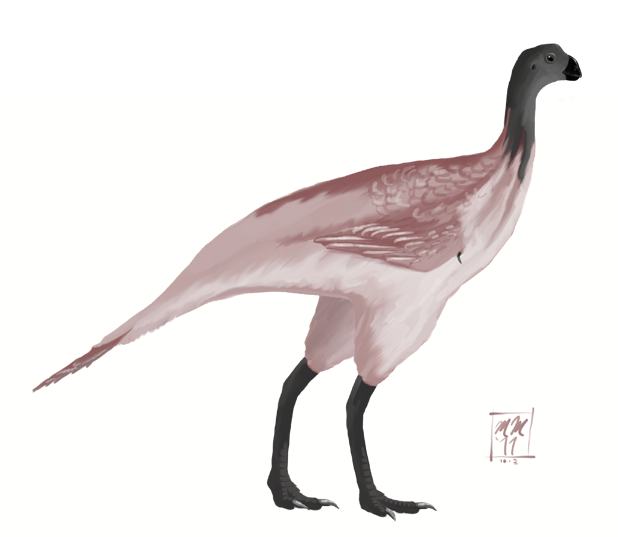
Artist's restoration of Avimimus

==== 1981 ====
- Kurzanov described the new genus and species Avimimus portentosus.

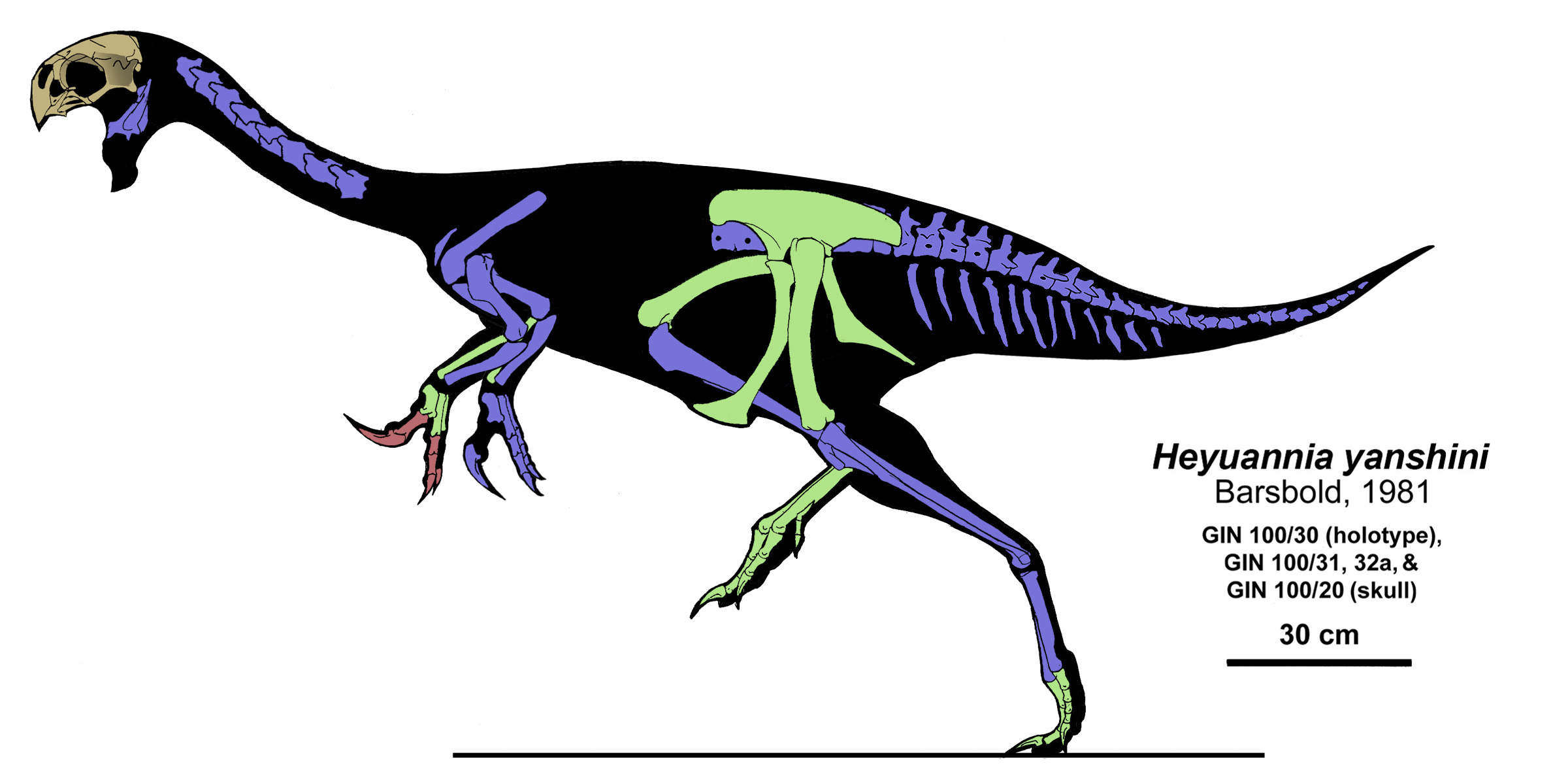
Known skeletal material of Ajancingenia, formerly "Ingenia"

- Barsbold described the new genus and species Ingenia yanshini. He also named the subfamily Ingeniinae and classified the family Caenagnathidae in the Oviraptorosauria.
- Osmolska described the new genus and species Elmisaurus rarus.

==== 1983 ====
- Barsbold proposed that oviraptorosaurs used their powerful beaks to feed on shelled mollusks.

==== 1986 ====
- Barsbold described the new species Oviraptor mongoliensis.
- Barsbold described the new genus and species Conchoraptor gracilis.
- Gauthier considered oviraptorosaurs, deinonychosaurs, and avialans to be maniraptorans.

==== 1988 ====
- Currie and Russell observed that caenagnathids had arctometatarsalian feet.

=== 1990s ===
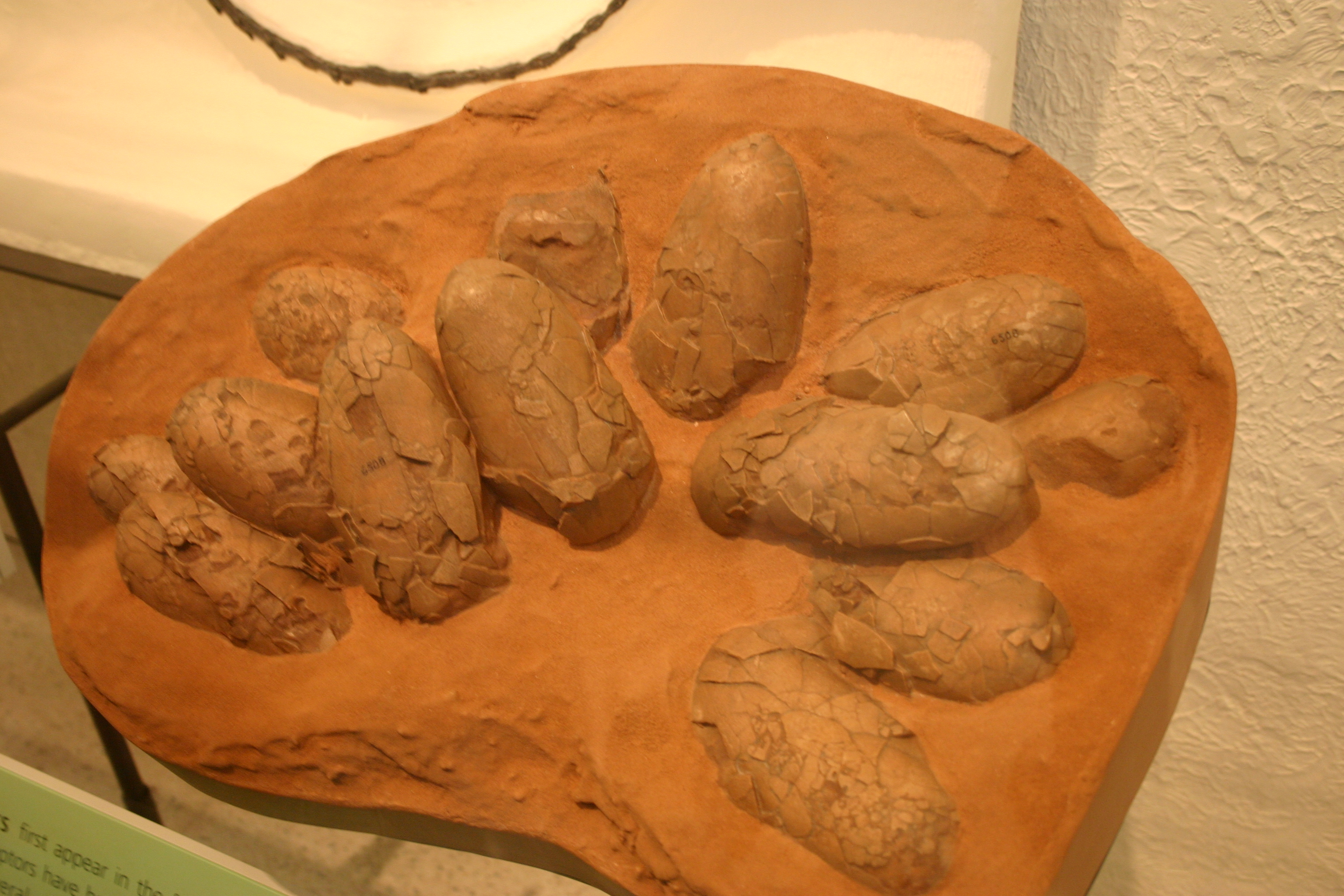
Fossilized Oviraptor nest, specimen AMNH FR 6508

==== 1991 ====
- Jerzykiewicz and Russell observed that oviraptorosaurs seem to have been most common during the Djadokhta stage.
- Sabath described an oviraptorosaur nest mound.

==== 1992 ====
- Smith interpreted the biomechanics of oviraptorosaur jaws to imply that these dinosaurs were actually herbivorous.

==== 1993 ====
- Jerzykiewicz and others observed that oviraptorosaurs seem to have been most common in central Asia.
- Currie, Godfrey, and Nessov described the new genus and species Caenagnathasia martinsoni.
- Currie and others built a case for interpreting oviraptorosaurs as egg-eaters who supplemented their diet with small prey. They noted supporting traits like the animals' ability to give a "powerful nipping bite" with the front of its beak. Oviraptorosaurs also had tooth-like projections from the roof of the mouth, which resemble similar adaptations in modern egg-eating mammals.
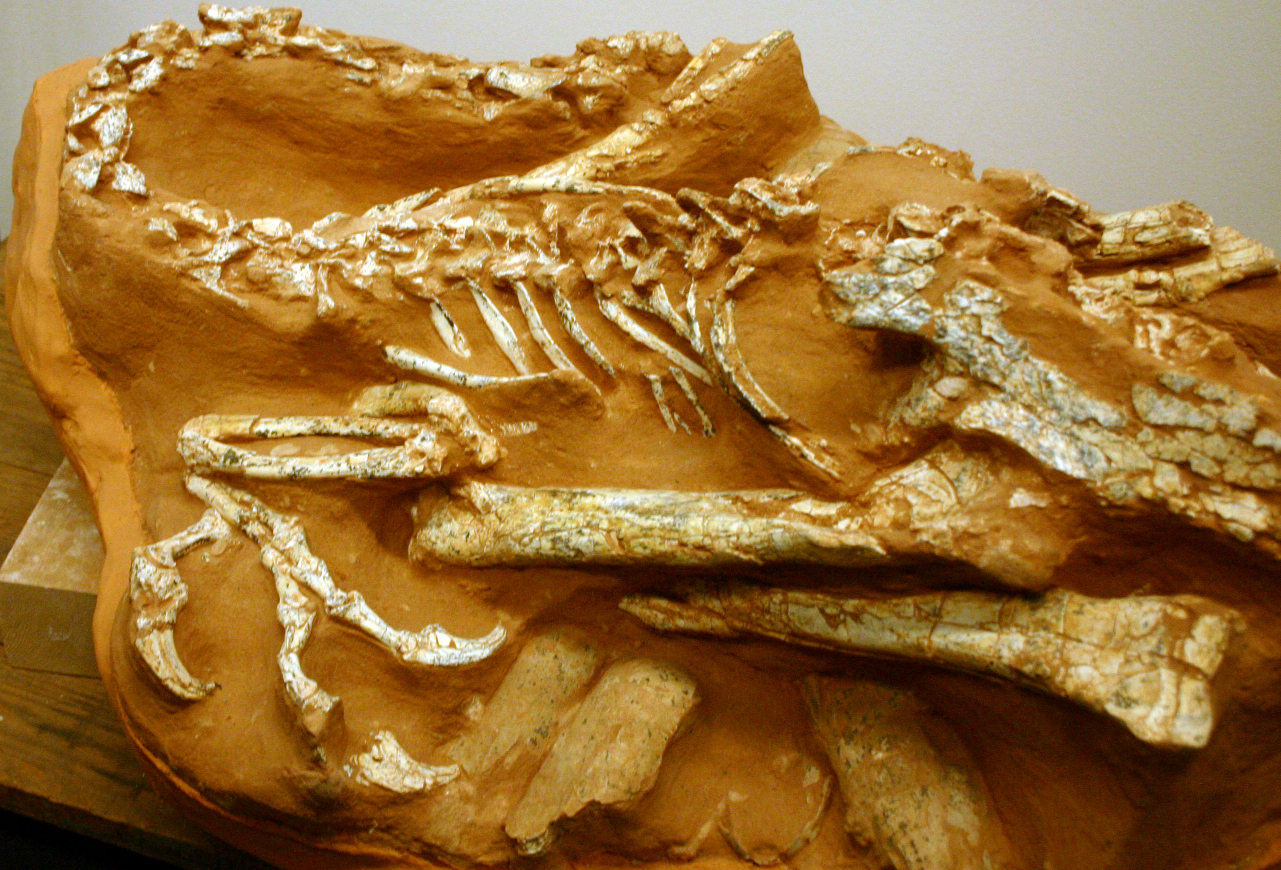
  Nesting Citipati specimen nicknamed "Big Auntie"
  The orientation of the throat on the underside of the jaw is also consistent with this reconstruction of oviraptorosaur paleoecology.
- Russell and Dong argued that the Maniraptora (which includes Oviraptorosauria) was a polyphyletic assemblage of unrelated groups. Instead they classified the traditional oviraptorosaurs with the ornithomimids, therizinosauroids, and troodontids in a new, greatly expanded Oviraptorosauria.

==== 1994 ====
- Norell and others reported the discovery of a tiny theropod skeleton in an oviraptorid nest. They suggested this find was evidence that oviraptorosaur hunted tiny game. They also noted that the supposed Protoceratops eggs of the Central Asiatic Expeditions actually preserved the embryonic remains of oviraptorosaurs.

==== 1996 ====
- Currie reported the presence of nests of large eggs more than 40 centimetres (16 in) long in China. Oviraptorosaurs would come to be considered possible candidates for the egg layers.
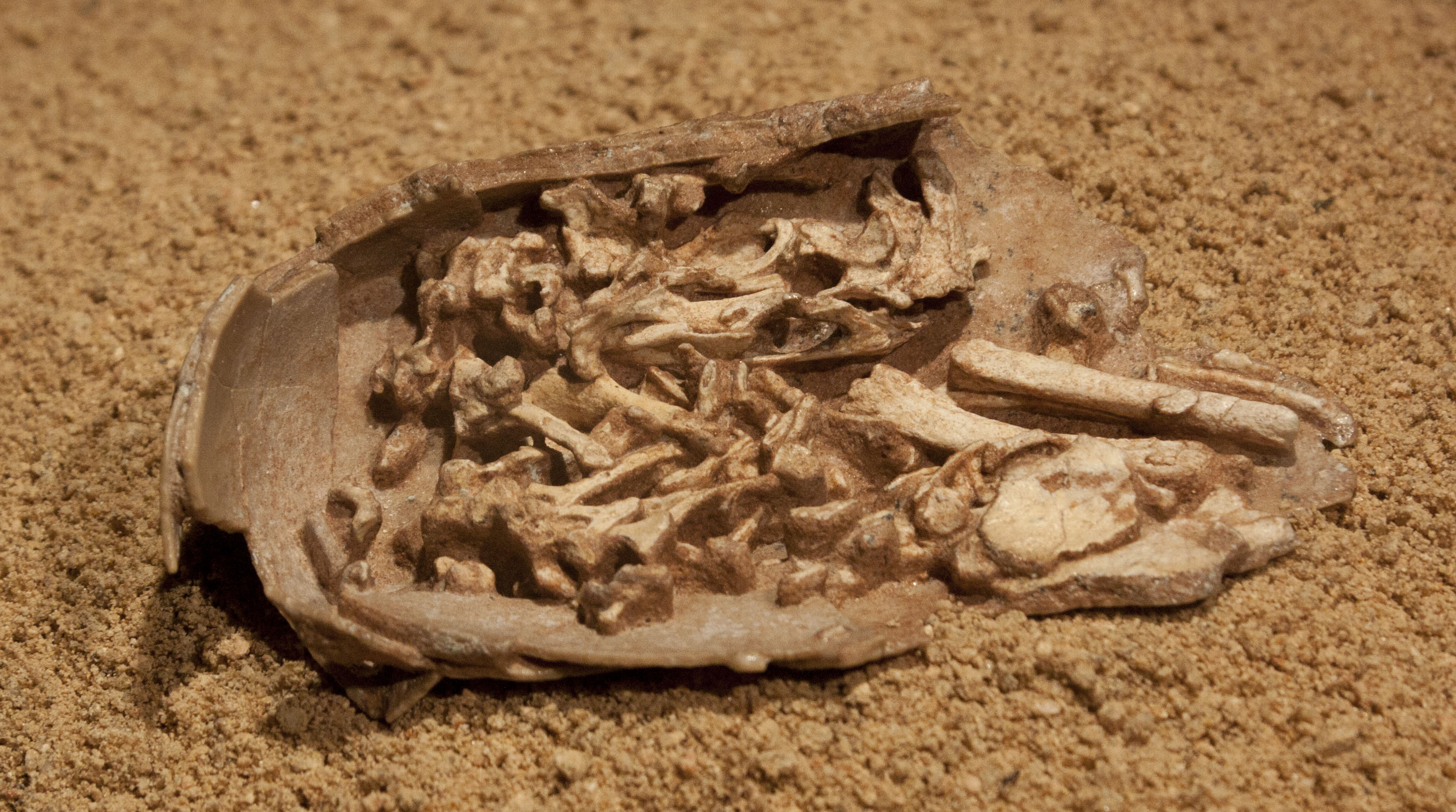
  Fossilized Citipati egg with preserved embryo
- Dong and Currie reported the discovery of an oviraptorid from the Djadokhta Formation of northern China preserved on top of a nest of eggs. This overturned more than 60 years of interpreting the Oviraptor of the Central Asiatic Expeditions as a rapacious egg-thief in favor of it likely being a faithful mother at her nest. The researchers reconstructed the way mother oviraptorosaurs built their nests. The standing mother would lay a pair of eggs and bury them by hand. Then she would turn and repeat the process until she had made a ring of egg-pairs completely around herself. Since by then the area where she was standing would be higher than the eggs, she would repeat the process with another ring of egg-pairs as a second layer. This process would gradually build an egg mound containing as many as 30 eggs in up to three layers.

==== 1997 ====
- Sues published a critical review of earlier interpretations of the oviraptorosaurs' evolutionary relationships and formulated the clade's first synapomorphy-based diagnosis. He also performed a cladistic analysis and found oviraptorosaurs to be the sister group of the therizinosaurs.
- Sereno regarded oviraptorosaurs as maniraptorans and found them to be the sister group of Paraves (which includes deinonychosaurs and birds) in a cladistic analysis.
- Padian and others published a cladistic definition for Oviraptorsauria for the first time; all taxa closer to Oviraptor than to birds.

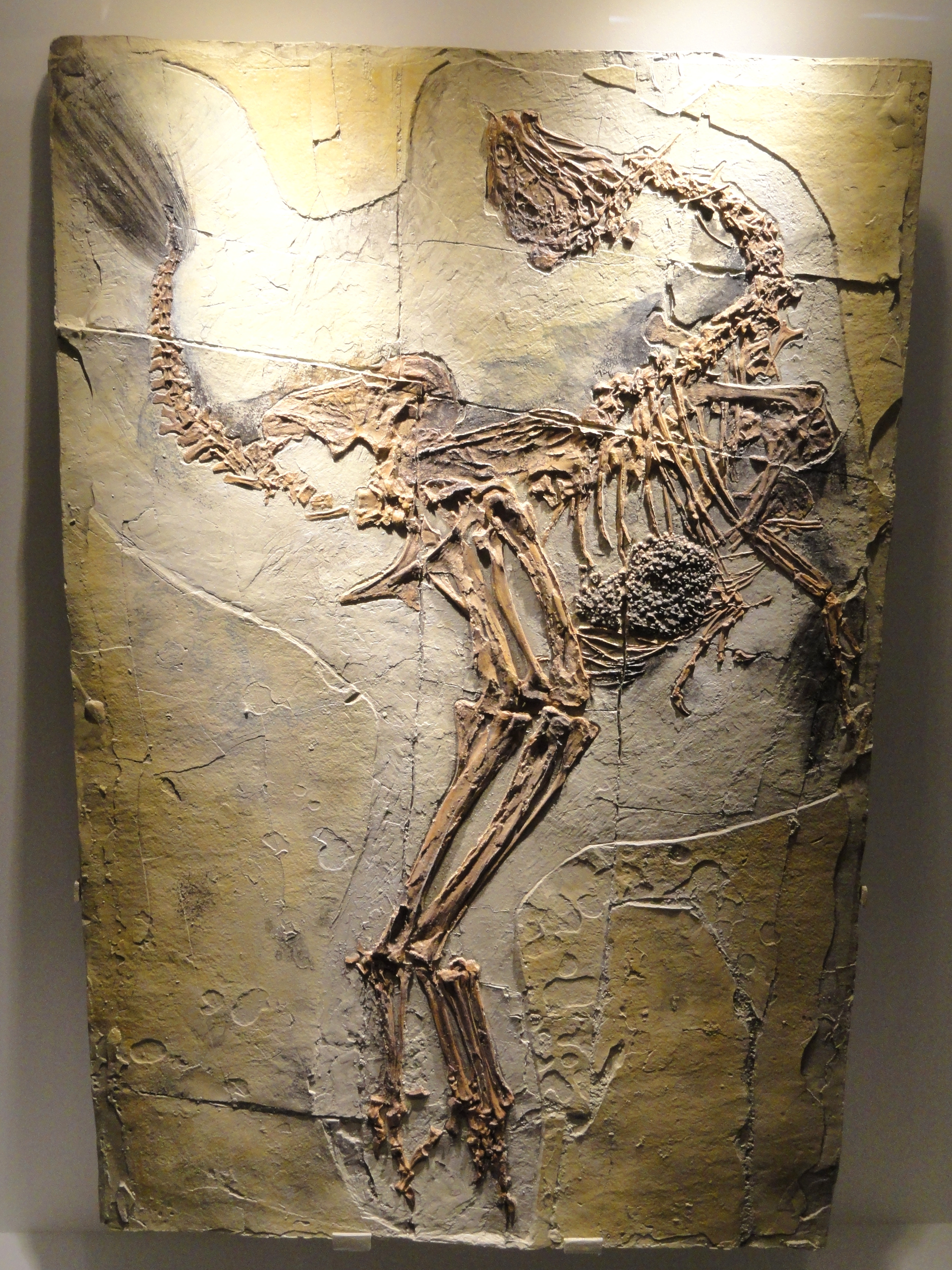
Cast of a Caudipteryx zoui specimen, Houston Museum of Natural Science

- Barsbold described the new genus Rinchenia for the species Oviraptor mongoliensis. Barsbold credited Currie and Padian for defining Oviraptorosauria as the Oviraptoridae and all taxa closer to Oviraptor.

==== 1998 ====
- Sereno regarded oviraptorosaurs as maniraptorans and found them to be the sister group of Paraves (which includes deinonychosaurs and birds) in a cladistic analysis. He defined oviraptorosaurs as all maniraptorans closer to Oviraptor than to Neornithes.
- Currie, Norell, and Ji described the new genus and species Caudipteryx zoui.
- Ji and others reported the presence of gastroliths in Caudipteryx. These are evidence for an herbivorous diet.
- Makovicky and Sues considered oviraptorosaurs to be the sister group of the therizinosaurs.

==== 1999 ====
- Sereno found Caudipteryx to be a basal oviraptorosaur. He also erected the clade Caenagnathoidea for the caenagnathids and oviraptorids.
- Elzanowski performed a cladistic analysis and found a group consisting of oviraptorosaurs, ornithomimosaurs and therizinosaurs were more closely related to birds than deinonychosaurs. No other cladistic study in the history of dinosaur research had come up with this result.
- Padian and others changed the definition of Oviraptorosauria from a stem-based clade to a node-based one. They defined the oviraptorosaurs as "Oviraptor and Chirostenotes (=Caenagnathus) and all the descendants of their most recent common ancestor."
- Clark and others observed that oviraptorosaurs are among the most common dinosaurs found at Ukhaa Tolgod in Mongolia. They reported further specimens preserved on nests in brooding position. They suggested contrary to Dong and Currie's 1996 reconstruction of oviraptorosaur nest-building behavior that the animals may have constructed their nests by maneuvering the eggs into position by hand. However, this explanation is less parsimonious and has less evidentiary support, so it never gained favor among paleontologists.

== 21st century ==
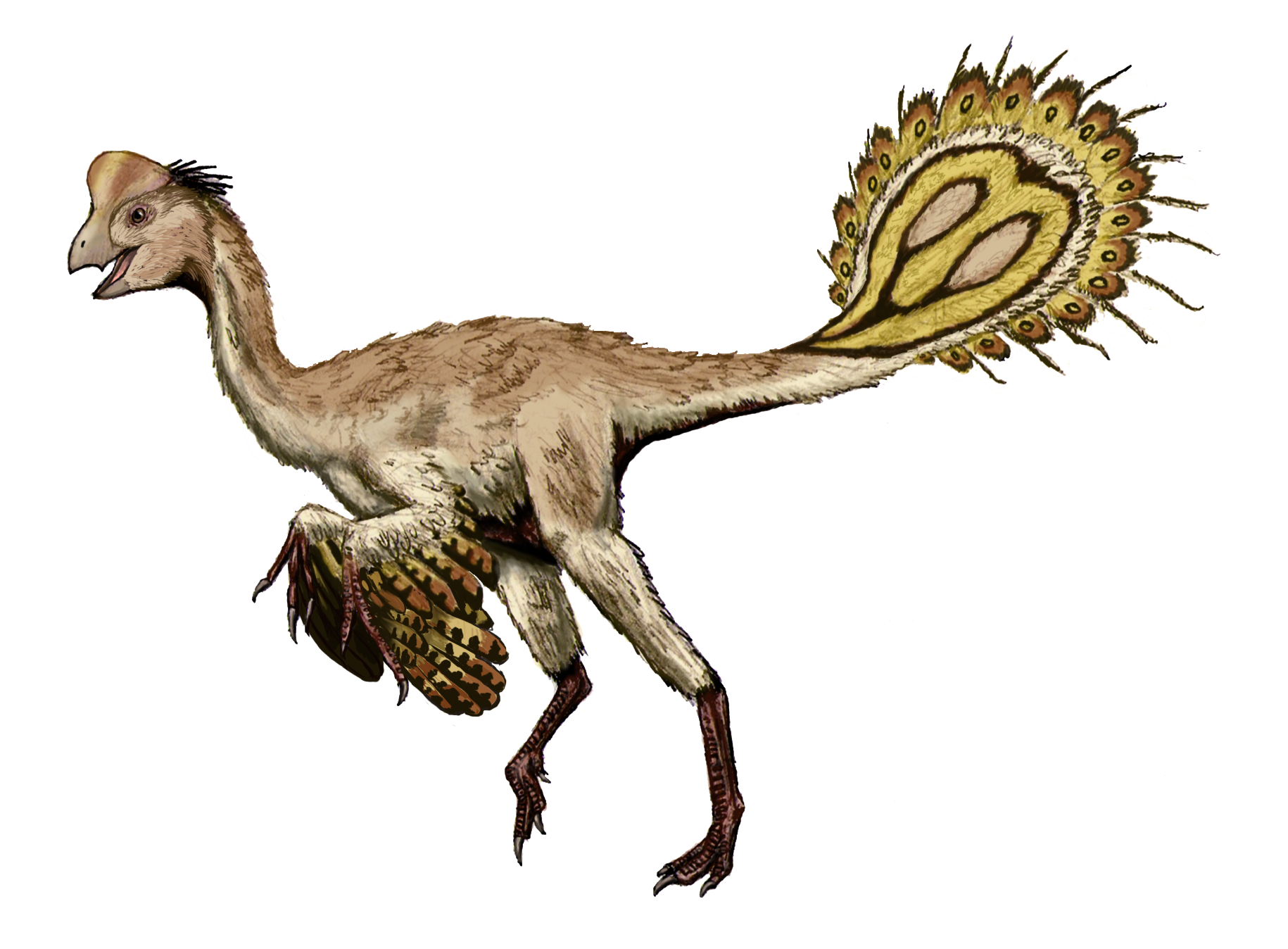
Artist's restoration of Nomingia

=== 2000s ===
==== 2000 ====
- Currie, Norell, and Ji described the new species Caudipteryx dongi.
- Barsbold and others described the new genus and species Nomingia gobiensis.
- Zhou and Wang named the Caudipterygidae.

==== 2001 ====
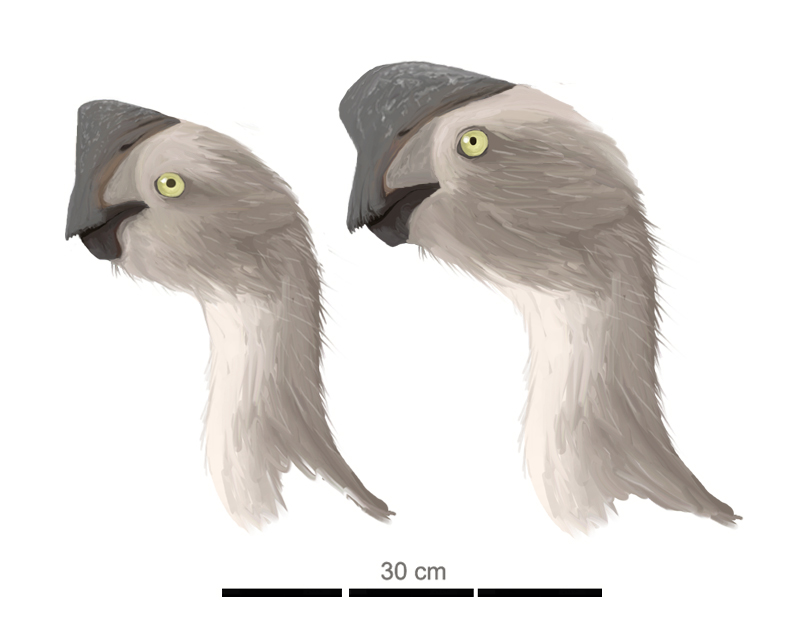
Citipati osmolskae and an unnamed Citipati species

- Clark, Norell, and Barsbold described the new genus and species Citipati osmolskae.
- Clark, Norell, and Barsbold described the new genus and species Khaan mckennai.
- David J. Varrichio reported the first occurrences of oviraptorosaurs from Montana. The first find was an articular region from the lower jaw of Caenagnathus sternbergi of Campanian age from the Two Medicine Formation. This species had previously only been known from the Canadian province of Alberta. Another new Montanan oviraptorosaur specimen, a foot found in the Hell Creek Formation, was assigned to Leptorhynchus elegans (as Elmisaurus elegans).
- Kevin Padian, Ji Qiang and Ji Shu-an published a review of known feathered dinosaurs and their implications for the origin of flight. The authors observe that many aspects of the distribution of feather homologues meet the expectations of earlier phylogenetic hypotheses, including a gradual transition from primitive filaments in Sinosauropteryx to the shared filaments and "rudimentary" true feathers in Caudipteryx and Protarchaeopteryx, to flight feathers in Archaeopteryx. The team speculates that the plumulaceous feathers in Caudipteryx and Protarchaeopteryx may have originated as tufts of Sinosauropteryx-style filaments, the shafts of which possibly formed by the consolidation of individual filaments. The parallel nature of the barbs in Caudipteryx and Protarcheopteryx suggest the existence of barbules. This suggests that barbules, which are necessary for flight-worthy wings, evolved prior to flight.

Cladogram of feathered dinosaurs from Padian et al. 2001

Feathered Dinosaurs

- Coelurosaurs
  - - - Maniraptora
        - - Aves
            - - - - - - Neornithes (P)
                      - Ichthyornis
                    - Hesperornis
                  - Patagopteryx
                - Enantiornithes (P)
              - Confuciusornis (P)
            - Archaeopteryx (P)
          - - Dromaeosaurs (F)
            - Troodontids
        - - - - Oviraptor
              - Caudipteryx (F)
            - Therizinosaurs (F)
          - Protarchaeopteryx (F)
      - Ornithomimids
    - Tyrannosaurus
  - - Sinosauropteryx (F)
    - Compsognathus

Taxa marked with a P were known to bear plumulaceous or pennaceous feathers at the time of the study. Taxa marked with F were known to bear simple filamentous integumentary structures.

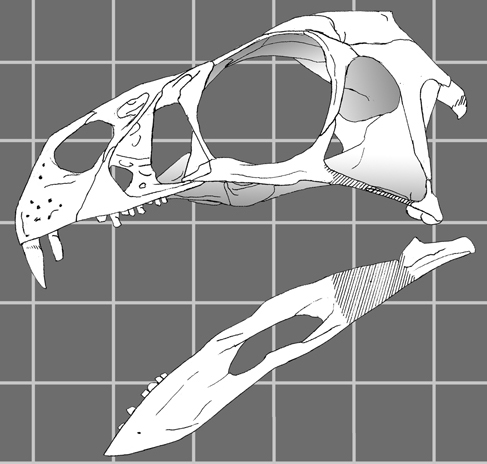
The skull of Incisivosaurus

==== 2002 ====
- Teresa Maryańska and others confirmed Sereno's finding that Caudipteryx was an oviraptorosaur. They also found Avimimus to be an oviraptorosaur as well.
- Xu and others described the new genus and species Incisivosaurus gauthieri. Their research supported recent findings that Caudipteryx and Avimimus were oviraptorosaurs.
- Maryanska and others performed a cladistic analysis that found oviraptorosaurs to be avialans.
- Zelenitsky and others studied the shape and shell histology of the large fossil eggs reported from China by Currie in 1996 and concluded that they may have been laid by oviraptorosaurs. Given their large size, this implied that giant oviraptorosaurs remained to be discovered.

==== 2003 ====
- Lü described the new genus and species Heyuannia huangi.

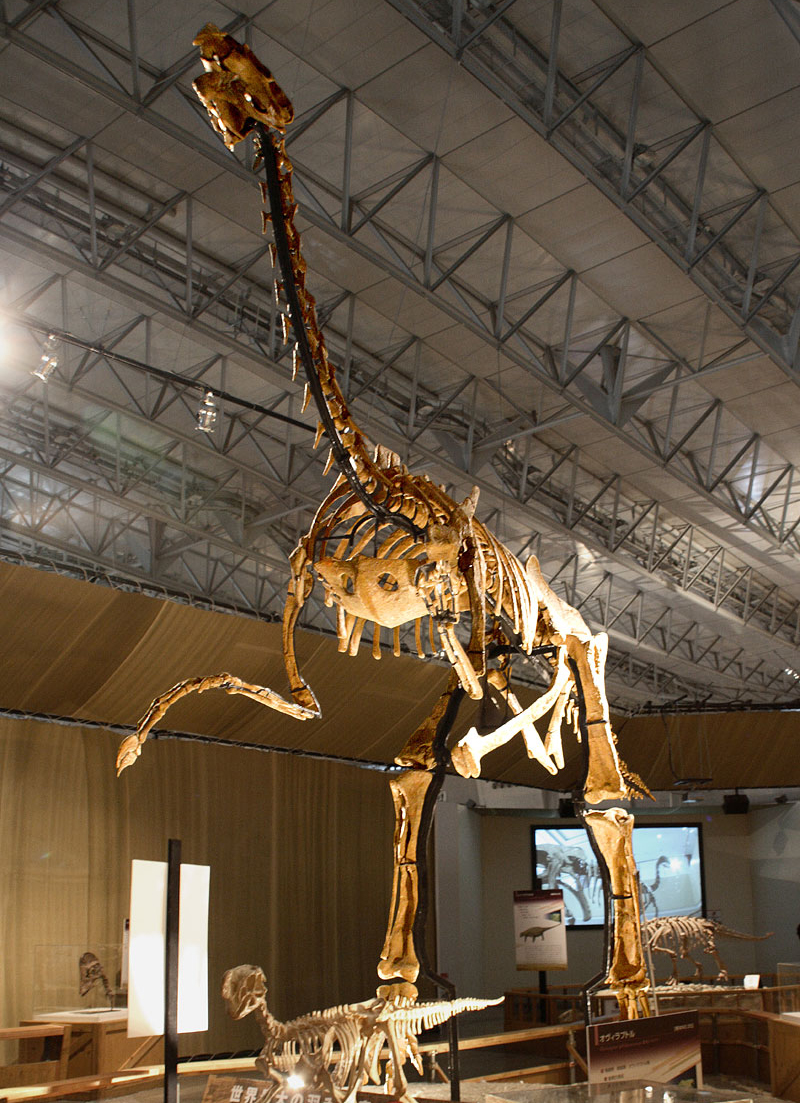
Skeletal mount of Gigantoraptor

==== 2004 ====
- Lü and others described the new genus and species Nemegtia barsboldi.

==== 2005 ====
- Zanno and Sampson described the new genus and species Hagryphus giganteus.
- Lü and others described the new genus Nemegtomaia.
- Lü and Zhang described the new genus and species Shixinggia oblita.

==== 2007 ====
- Xu and others described the new genus and species Gigantoraptor erlianensis.

==== 2008 ====
- T. He, X.-L. Wang, and Z.-H. Zhou described the new genus and species Similicaudipteryx yixianensis.

==== 2009 ====
- Lü and others described the new genus and species Luoyanggia liudianensis.

=== 2010s ===
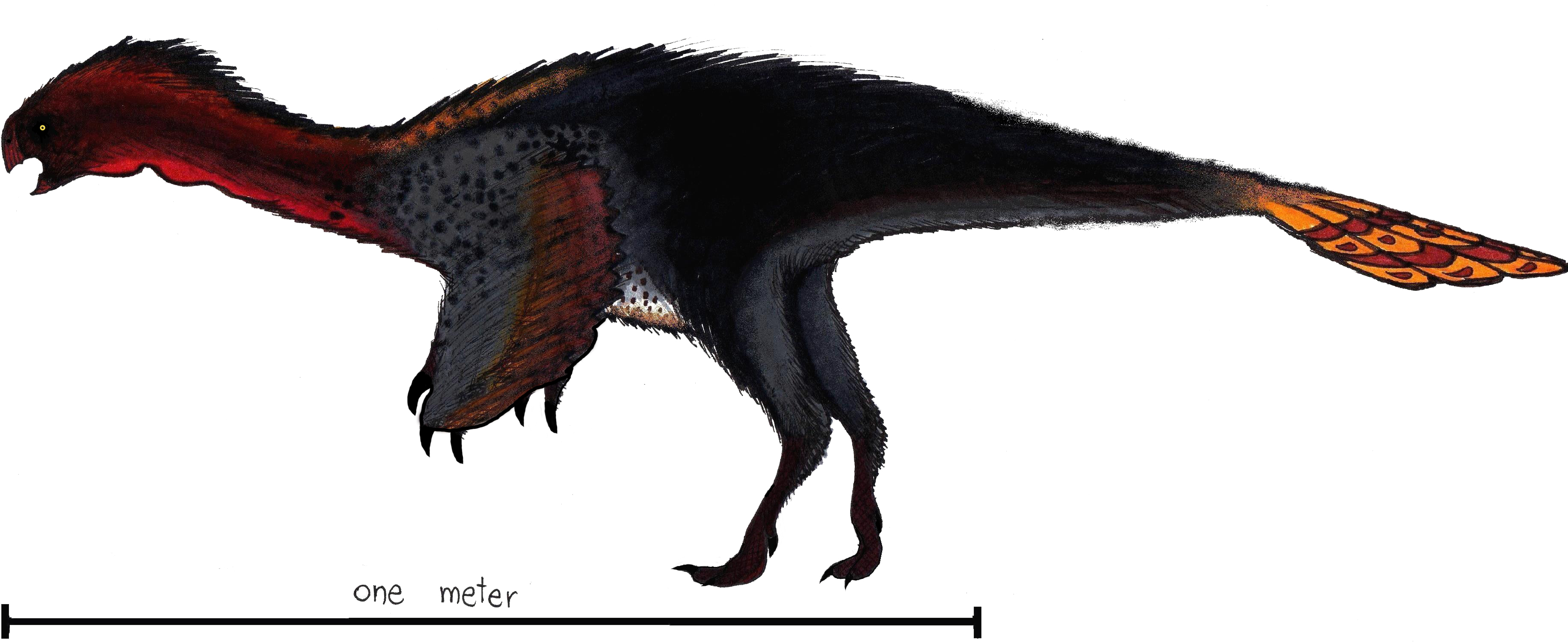
Artist's restoration of Machairasaurus

==== 2010 ====
- Xu and Han described the new genus and species Banji long.
- Longrich, Currie and Dong described the new genus and species Machairasaurus leptonychus.

==== 2011 ====
- Sullivan, Jasinski and Van Tomme described the new genus and species Epichirostenotes curriei.
- Robert M. Sullivan, Steven E. Jasinski, and Mark P.A. Van Tomme described the new genus and species Ojoraptorsaurus boerei.

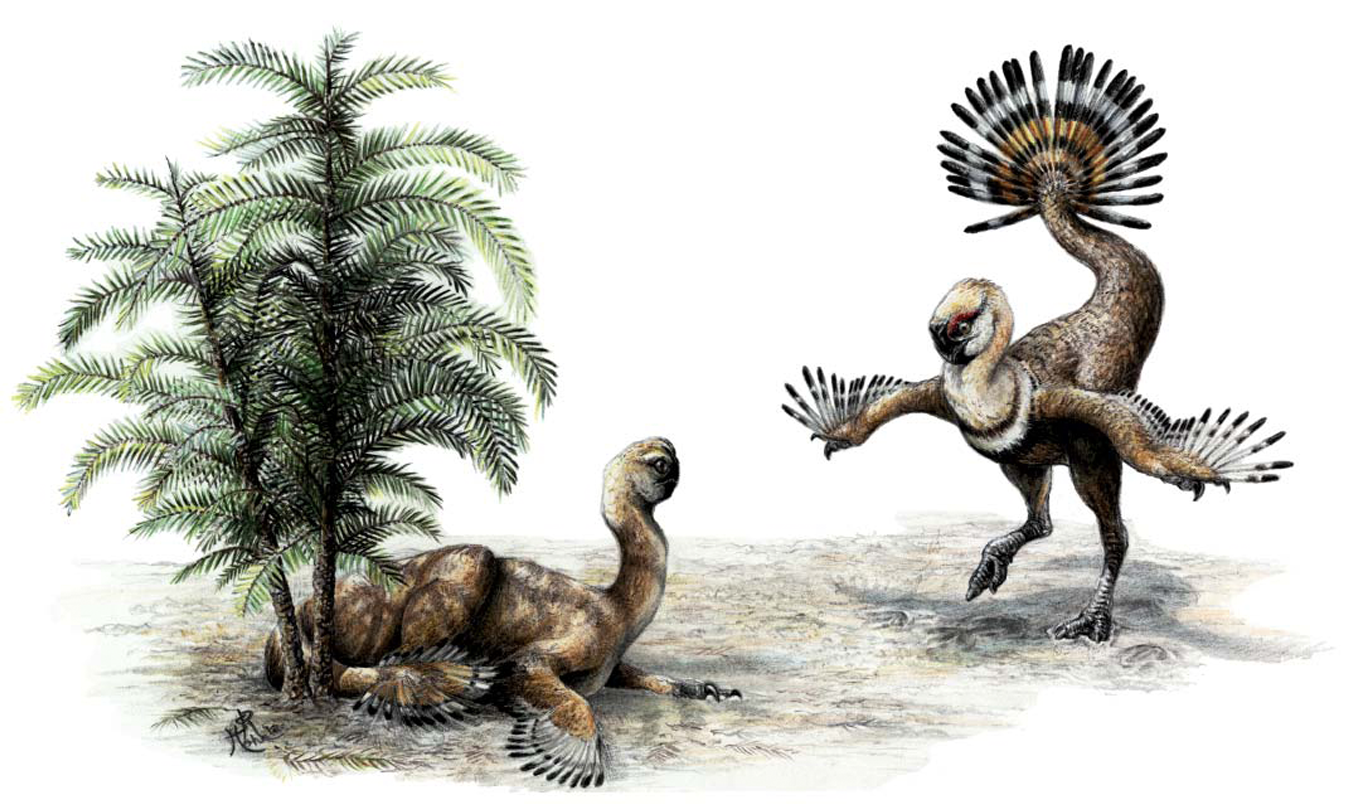
Artist's restoration of two Ajancingenia

==== 2012 ====
- Ji and others described the new genus and species Ningyuansaurus wangi.

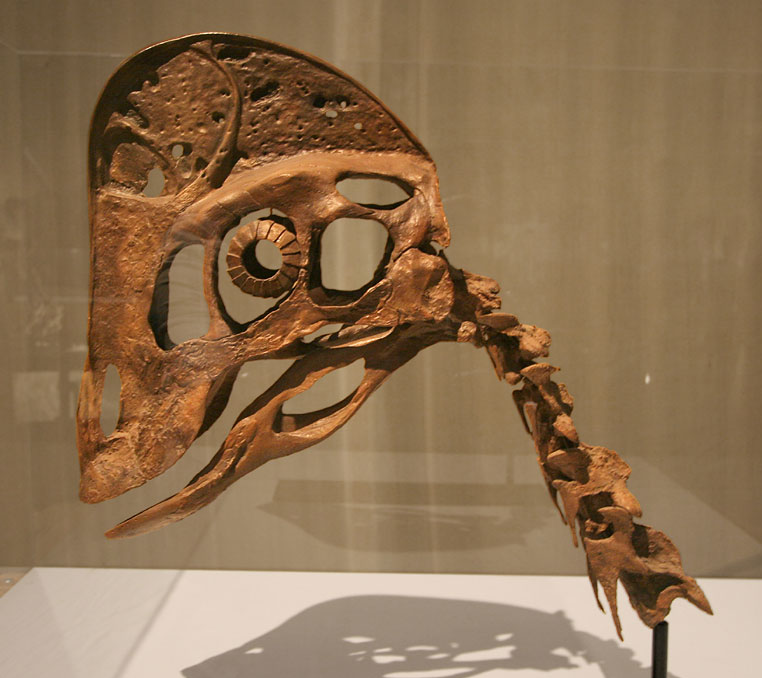
Skull and neck of Anzu

==== 2013 ====
- Easter described the new genus Ajancingenia, as a replacement name for "Ingenia".
- Wang and others described the new genus and species Ganzhousaurus nankangensis.
- Wei and others described the new genus and species Jiangxisaurus ganzhouensis.
- Longrich and others described the new genus and species Leptorhynchos gaddisi.
- Lü and others described the new genus and species Nankangia jiangxiensis.
- Xu and others described the new genus and species Wulatelong gobiensis.
- Lü and others described the new genus and species Yulong mini.

==== 2014 ====
- Lamanna and others described the new genus and species Anzu wyliei.

==== 2015 ====
- Lü and others described the new genus and species Huanansaurus ganzhouensis.

==== 2016 ====
- Funston and Currie described the new genus and species Apatoraptor pennatus.
- Lü and others described the new genus and species Tongtianlong limosus.

==== 2017 ====
- Lü and others described the new genus and species Beibeilong sinensis.
- Lü and others described the new genus and species Corythoraptor jacobsi.

==== 2018 ====
- Yu and others described the new genus and species Anomalipes zhaoi.
- Funston and others described the new species Avimimus nemegtensis

==== 2019 ====
- Lee and others described the new genus and species Gobiraptor minutus.
- Qiu and others described the new genus and species Xingtianosaurus ganqi.

== See also ==
- History of paleontology
  - Timeline of paleontology
- Timeline of ornithomimosaur research
