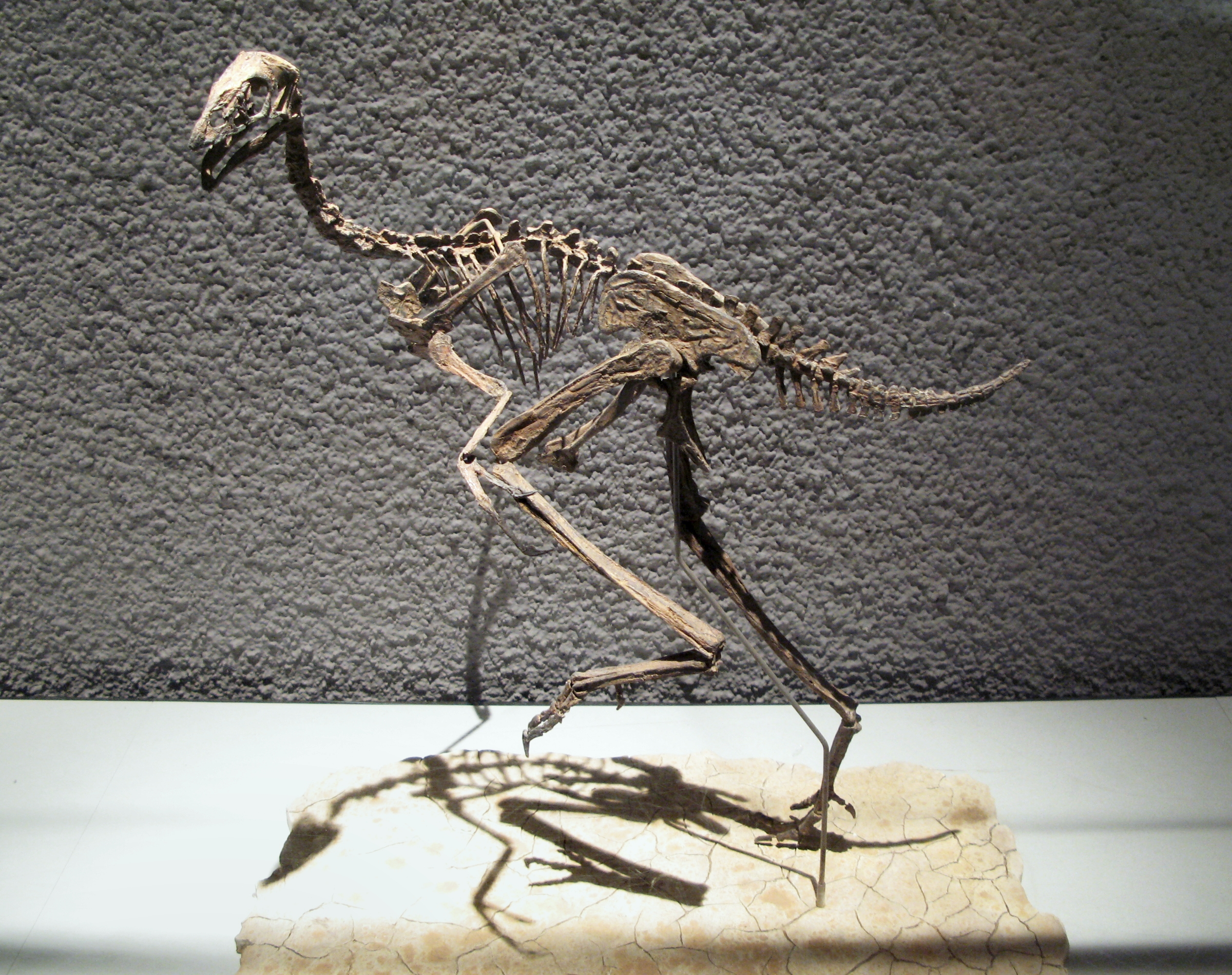
- Mounted Caudipteryx zoui skeleton at Löwentor Museum

Scientific classification
- Kingdom: Animalia
- Phylum: Chordata
- Class: Reptilia
- Clade: Dinosauria
- Clade: Saurischia
- Clade: Theropoda
- Clade: †Oviraptorosauria
- Family: †Caudipteridae
- Genus: †Caudipteryx; Ji et al. 1998

Type species
- †Caudipteryx zoui Ji et al., 1998

Other species
- †C. dongi? Zhou & Wang, 2000

= Caudipteryx =

Caudipteryx Temporal range: Early Cretaceous, (Barremian) ~124.6 Ma

Genus of oviraptorosaur dinosaurs

Caudipteryx (meaning "tail feather") is a genus of small oviraptorosaurian dinosaurs that lived in China during the Early Cretaceous, around 124.6 million years ago. They were feathered and extremely bird-like in their overall appearance, to the point that some paleontologists suggested it was a bird. Two species have been described: C. zoui (the type species), in 1998, and C. dongi, in 2000. Caudipteryx had a stout trunk, long legs, and was probably a swift runner. Its discovery has led to many intensive studies and debate over the relationship between birds and dinosaurs.

== History ==
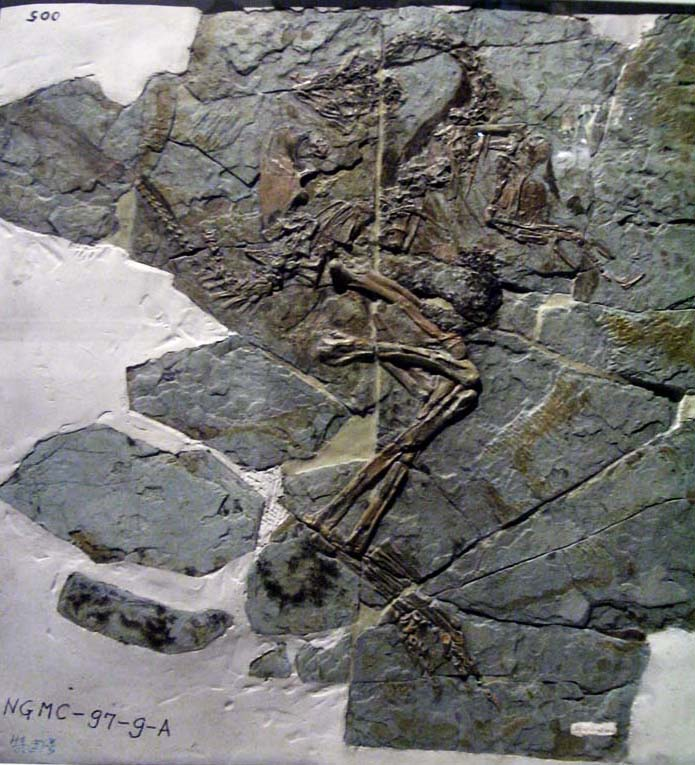
Paratype of C. zoui, at the Hong Kong Science Museum

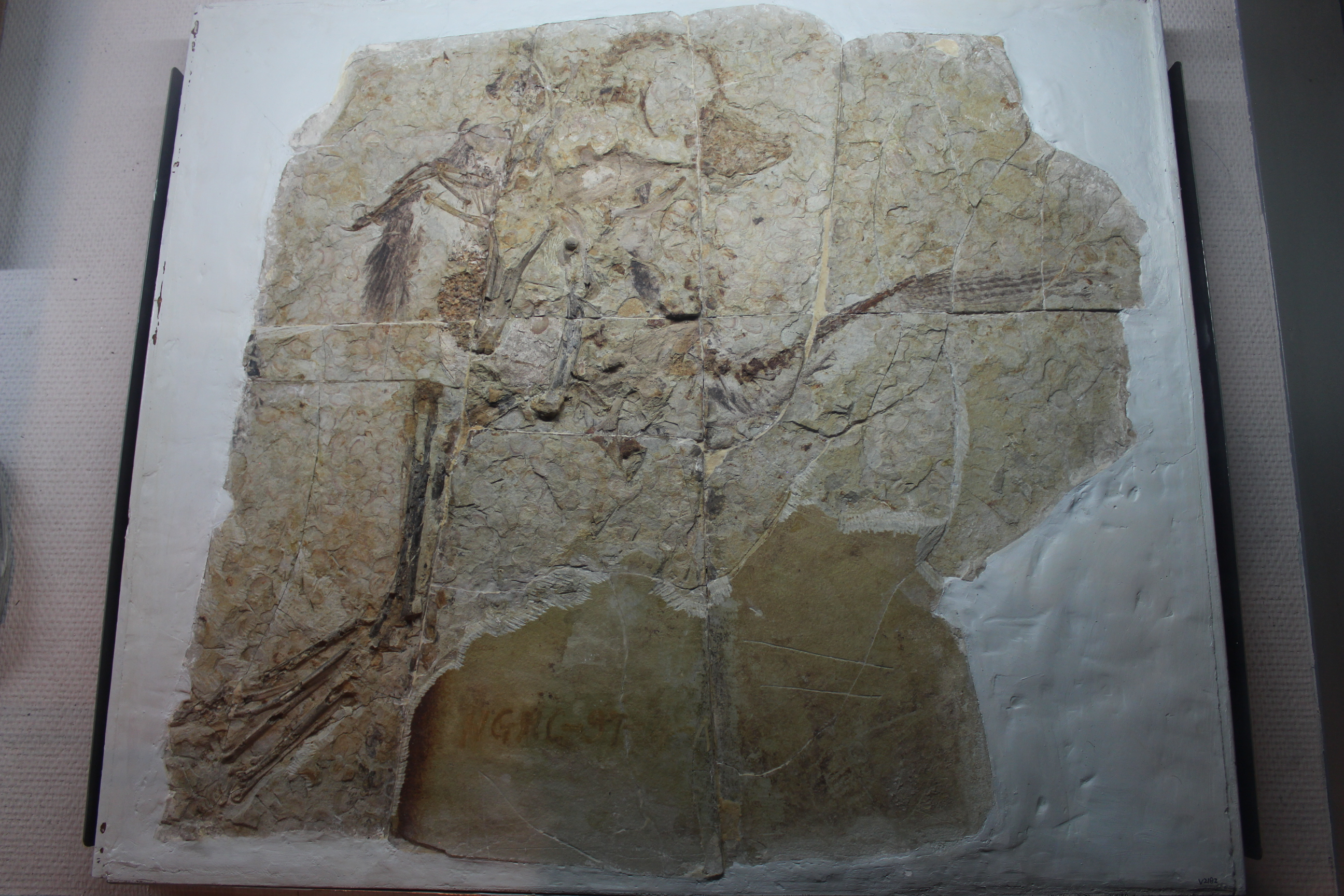
Holotype of C. zoui, at the Geological Museum of China

In 1997, several well-preserved dinosaur skeletons were recovered from the Jiulongsong Member of the Chaomidianzi Formation (now Jianshangou Bed of the Yixian Formation), at the Sihetun locality of Liaoning province, China. The fossils were later described in 1998 and used as the type specimens for the new dinosaur taxa Caudipteryx and Protarchaeopteryx. Caudipteryx was erected with the type species C. zoui and the holotype is NGMC 97-4-A, a nearly complete individual preserving conspicuous feather impressions and gastroliths. The paratype is NGMC 97-9-A, another relatively complete individual with feather impressions. The generic name, Caudipteryx, means "tail feather", and the specific name, zoui, is in honor of Zou Jiahua for his prominent support to the scientific community as the vice premier of China.

Around the summer of 1988, a partially complete skeleton of Caudipteryx lacking the skull was found in sediments of the "Layer 6" of the Yixian Formation, at the Zhangjiagou locality, which is set apart 3 km (1.9 mi) from Sihetun. This specimen, IVPP V 12344, was in 2000 described and designed as the holotype for new species Caudipteryx dongi, and in a similar fashion to previous specimens of the genus, it preserves exquisite traces of feather integument. The specific name dongi honors Zhiming Dong, a Chinese paleontologist.

=== Additional specimens ===
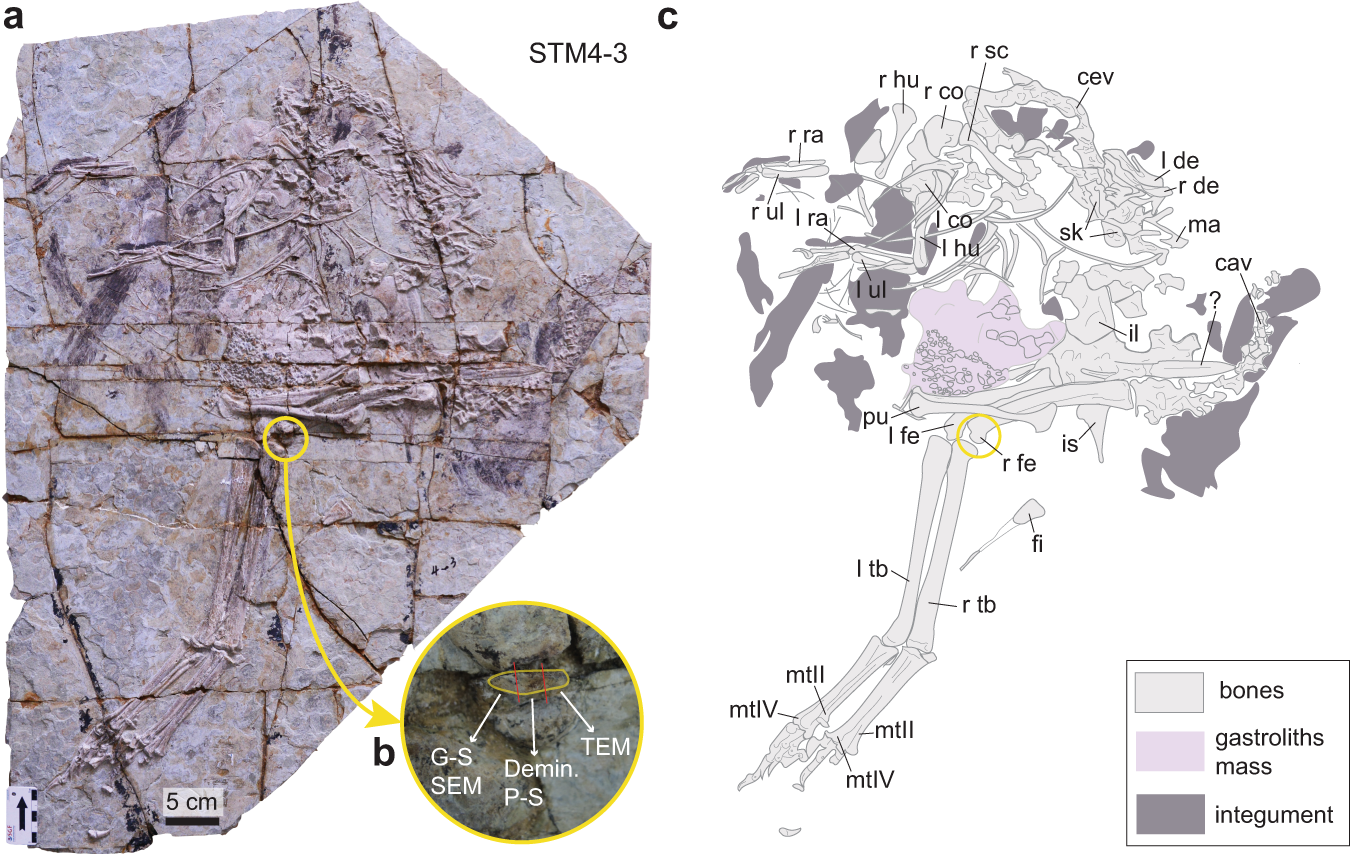
Specimen STM4-3 and line diagram

During 2000, Zhong-He Zhou and colleagues described two additional specimens of Caudipteryx, BPM 0001 and IVPP V 12430, referred to C. zoui and C. sp. respectively. Both individuals preserve nearly complete skulls and have feather impressions. Further analyses to IVPP V 12430 have revealed the preservation of propatagium on its left arm.

In 2021 Xiaoting Zheng and team described STM4-3 representing an articulated individual lacking the skull and tail tip, including abundant integument, gastroliths, but also a cartilage fragment that was reported to preserve chondrocytes. The specimen was collected from outcrops of the Yixian Formation at Dapingfang Town near Chaoyang city, west Liaoning.

== Description ==
=== Size ===
Size comparison of Caudipteryx species to a human

Caudipteryx was a small theropod, measuring 72.5–89 cm (2 ft 4.5 in – 2 ft 11.0 in) long and weighing about 5 kg (11 lb) based on femur length. Like many other maniraptorans, it has a mix of reptile- and bird-like anatomical features.

=== Skull ===
It had a short, boxy skull with a beak-like snout that retained only a few tapered teeth in the front of the upper jaw.

=== Postcranial skeleton ===
Its short tail was stiffened toward the tip, with few vertebrae, like in birds and other oviraptorosaurs. It has a primitive pelvis and shoulder, and primitive skull details in the quadratojugal, squamosal, quadrate, jugal, and mandibular fenestra (in the cheek, jaw, and jaw joint). It has a hand skeleton with a reduced third finger, like that of early birds and the oviraptorid Heyuannia.

Caudipteryx had uncinate processes on the ribs, birdlike teeth, a first toe which may or may not be partially reversed and overall body proportions that are comparable to those of modern flightless birds.

=== Feathers ===
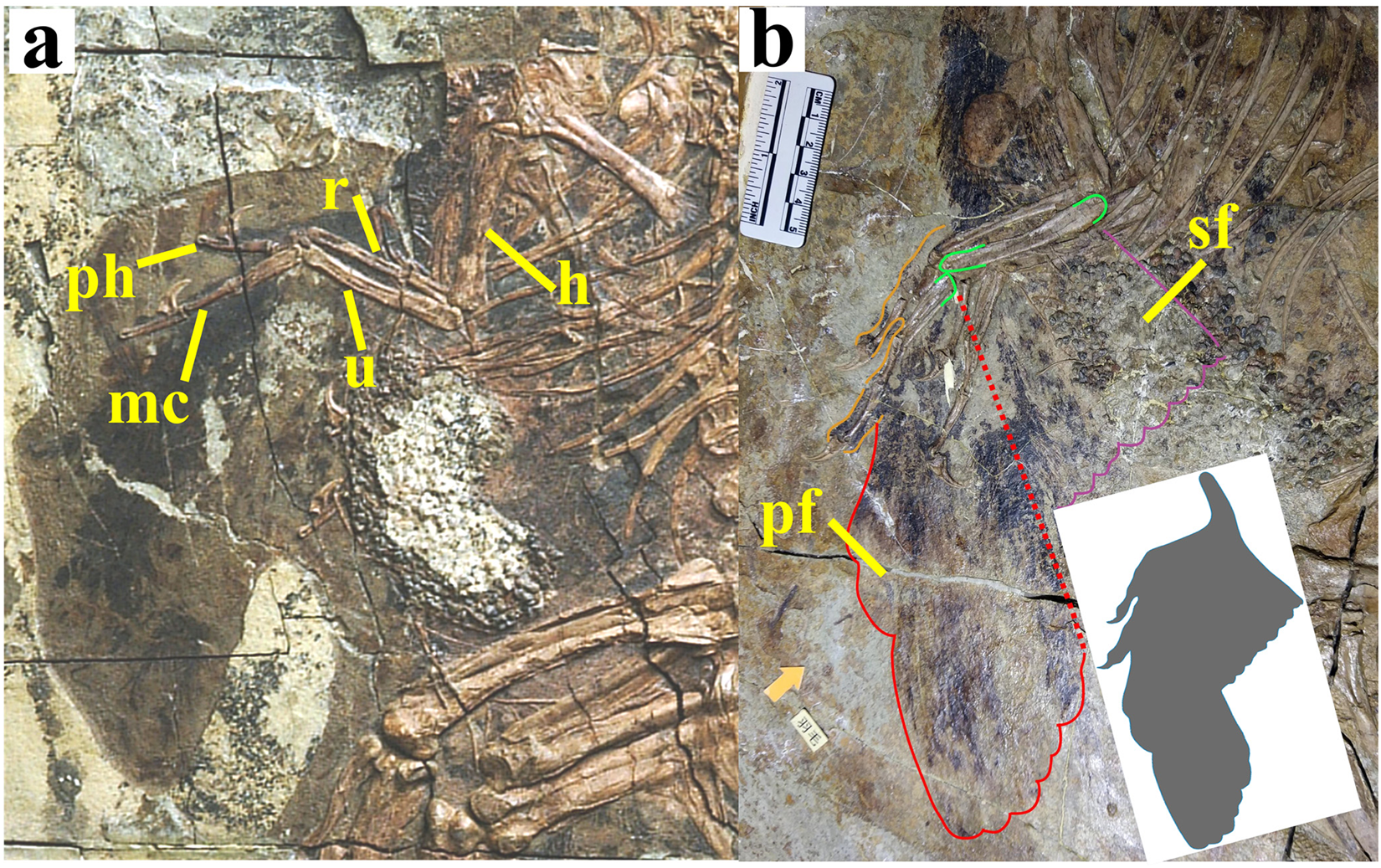
Wing reconstruction and feather impressions of Caudipteryx sp. (a) and C. dongi (b)

The hands of Caudipteryx supported symmetrical, pennaceous feathers that had vanes and barbs, measuring between 15 and 20 centimetres (5.9 and 7.9 inches) long. The primary feathers were arranged in a wing-like fan along the second finger, just like primary feathers of birds and other maniraptorans. An additional fan of feathers existed on its tail. The body of C. zoui was covered in black feathers, with a visible banding pattern preserved on tail feathers.

A study on the number of flight feathers has concluded that Caudipteryx was secondarily flightless.

== Classification ==
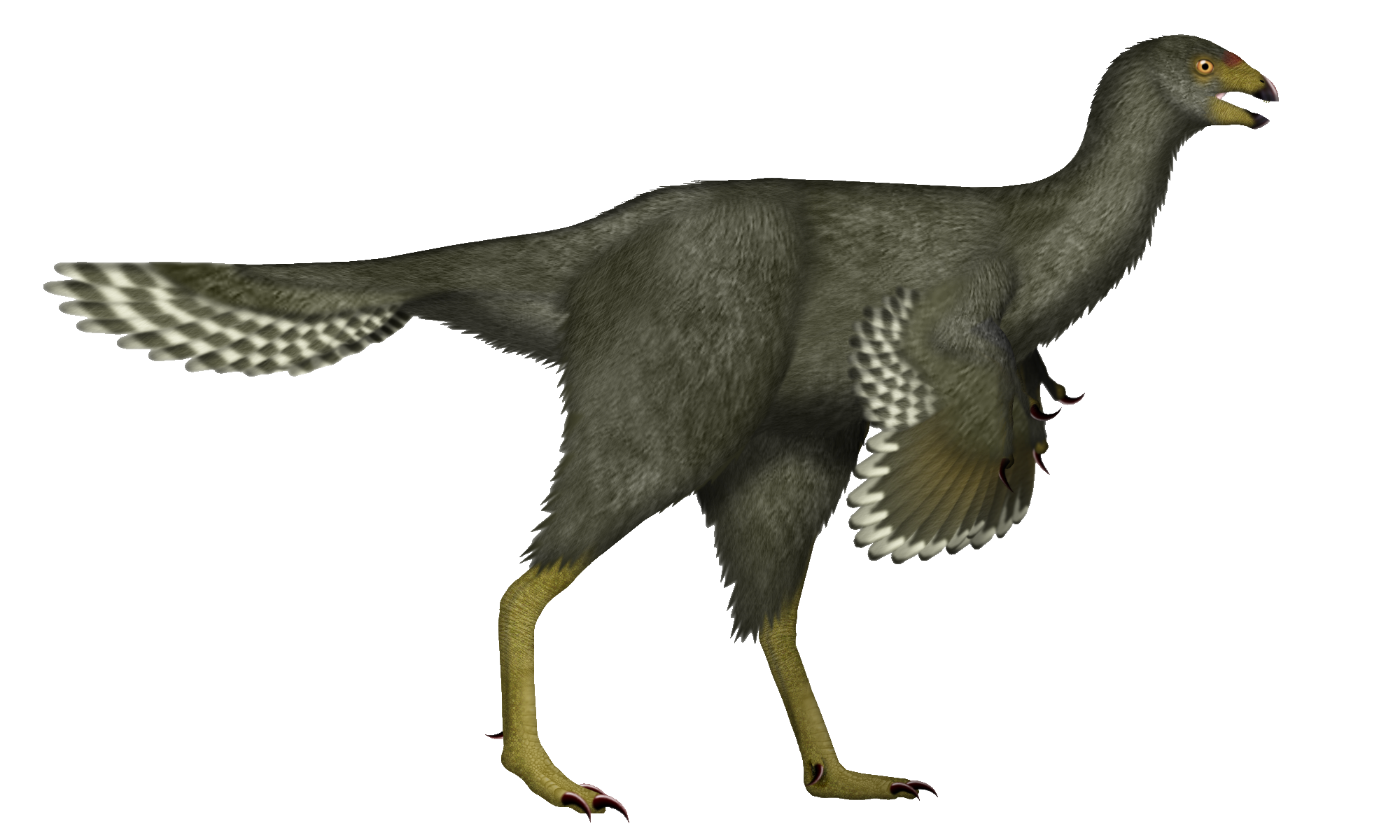
Life restoration

The consensus view, based on several cladistic analyses, is that Caudipteryx is a basal (primitive) member of the Oviraptorosauria, and the oviraptorosaurians are non-avian theropod dinosaurs. Incisivosaurus is the only oviraptorosaur that is more primitive.

Halszka Osmólska et al. (2004) ran a cladistic analysis that came to a different conclusion. They found that the most birdlike features of oviraptorids actually place the whole clade within Aves itself, meaning that Caudipteryx is both an oviraptorid and a bird. In their analysis, birds evolved from more primitive theropods, and one lineage of birds became flightless, re-evolved some primitive features, and gave rise to the oviraptorids. This analysis was persuasive enough to be included in paleontological textbooks like Benton's Vertebrate Paleontology (2005). The view that Caudipteryx was secondarily flightless is also preferred by Gregory S. Paul, Lü et al., and Maryańska et al.

Others, such as Stephen Czerkas and Larry Martin have concluded that Caudipteryx is not a theropod dinosaur at all. They believe that Caudipteryx, like all maniraptorans, is a flightless bird, and that birds evolved from non-dinosaurian archosaurs.

A weighted cladogram from 2014, using TNT, is shown below.

- Oviraptorosauria
  - Protarchaeopteryx
  - - Incisivosaurus
    - - Similicaudipteryx
      - - - Avimimus
          - Microvenator
        - - Caudipteryx
          - Caenagnathoidea
            - Caenagnathidae
              - Chirostenotes
              - Gigantoraptor
            - Oviraptoridae
              - Oviraptor
              - - Citipati
                - Khaan

=== Relationship with birds ===
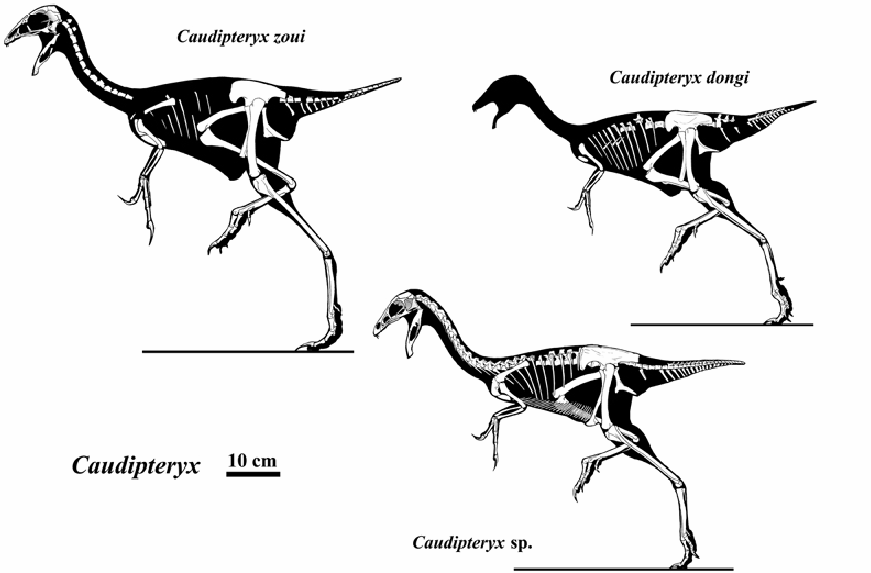
Skeletal restorations of three specimens

Because Caudipteryx has clear and unambiguously pennaceous feathers, like modern birds, and because several cladistic analyses have consistently recovered it as a non-avian oviraptorid dinosaur, it provided, at the time of its description, the clearest and most succinct evidence that birds evolved from dinosaurs. Lawrence Witmer stated: "The presence of unambiguous feathers in an unambiguously non-avian theropod has the rhetorical impact of an atomic bomb, rendering any doubt about the theropod relationships of birds ludicrous."

However, not all scientists agreed that Caudipteryx was unambiguously non-avian, and some of them continued to doubt that general consensus. Paleornithologist Alan Feduccia sees Caudipteryx as a flightless bird evolving from earlier archosaurian dinosaurs rather than from late theropods. Jones et al. (2000) found that Caudipteryx was a bird based on a mathematical comparison of the body proportions of flightless birds and non-avian theropods. Dyke and Norell (2005) criticized this result for flaws in their mathematical methods, and produced results of their own which supported the opposite conclusion. Other researchers not normally involved in the debate over bird origins, such as Zhou, acknowledged that the true affinities of Caudipteryx were debatable.

== Paleobiology ==
=== Diet ===
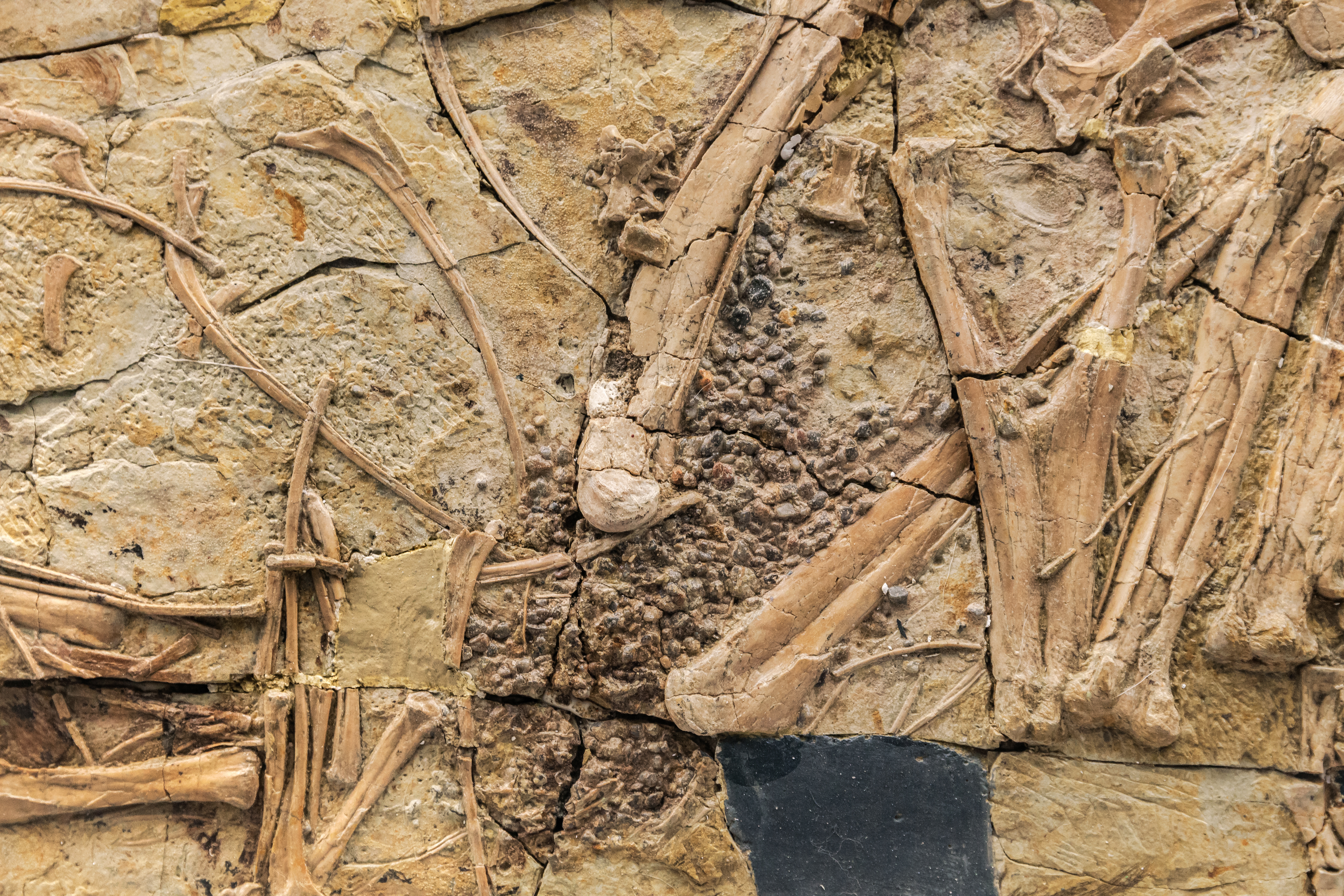
Gastroliths in stomach region of C. zoui specimen BPV 085, National Museum of Natural Science

Caudipteryx is thought to have been an omnivore. In at least two specimens of Caudipteryx (NGMC 97 4 A and NGMC 97 9 A), gastroliths are preserved. As in some herbivorous dinosaurs, the avialan Sapeornis, and modern birds, these gastroliths remain in the position where the animals' gizzards would have been.

== Paleoenvironment ==
All Caudipteryx fossils were recovered from the Yixian Formation in Liaoning, China. Specifically, they come from a small area of the Jianshangou bed, near the town of Zhangjiakou. They appear to have been fairly common, though isolated to this small region. The specific region in which Caudipteryx lived was home to the other feathered dinosaurs Dilong and Sinornithosaurus.

== See also ==
- Dinosaur coloration
- Timeline of oviraptorosaur research
