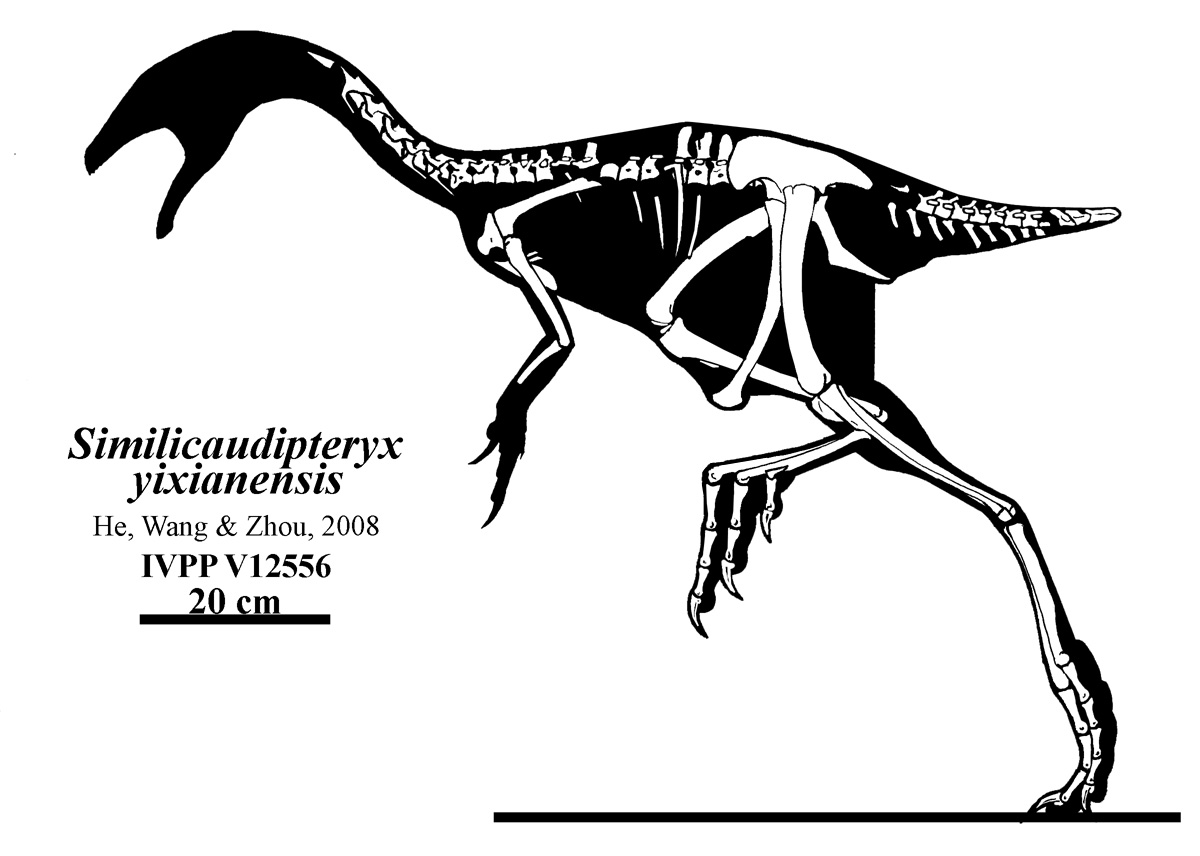
- Restored holotype skeleton

Scientific classification
- Kingdom: Animalia
- Phylum: Chordata
- Class: Reptilia
- Clade: Dinosauria
- Clade: Saurischia
- Clade: Theropoda
- Family: †Caudipteridae
- Genus: †Similicaudipteryx; He et al., 2008
- Species: †S. yixianensis

Binomial name
- †Similicaudipteryx yixianensis He et al., 2008

= Similicaudipteryx =

Similicaudipteryx Temporal range: Early Cretaceous, 124–120 Ma

Extinct genus of dinosaurs

Similicaudipteryx, meaning "similar to Caudipteryx" (which itself means "tail feather"), is a genus of theropod dinosaur of the family Caudipteridae.

== Discovery and naming ==
In 2007 the find of a new caudipterid was reported. In 2008 the new genus Similicaudipteryx, with as type species Similicaudipteryx yixianensis, was named and described by He Tao, Wang Xiaolin and Zhou Zonghe. The generic name, derived from Latin similis, "resembling", refers to its similarity to the closely related Caudipteryx. The specific name refers to its provenance from Yixian County. Presently, S. yixianensis is the only species named in the genus.

The holotype specimen, IVPP V 12556, was recovered from the Jiufotang Formation of northeastern China, dating to the early Cretaceous Period middle Aptian stage, about 120 million years ago or perhaps early Albian stage, about 112 million years old. It consists of a nearly complete skeleton of an adult individual compressed on a plate, that however lacks the skull, the front neck and the hands.

In 2010, two additional specimens with extensive feather preservation were referred to Similicaudipteryx, one of a juvenile, STM4-1, and the other of a much larger juvenile, STM22-6. Both were reported as found in the Yixian Formation, dating to the early Aptian stage, about 124 million years ago. However, these have since been re-interpreted as belonging to the related species Incisivosaurus gauthieri.

In 2010 Gregory S. Paul renamed the species to Caudipteryx yixianensis, but this has found no acceptance.

== Description ==
Similicaudipteryx was a small oviraptorosaur similar to, but larger than, the perhaps closely related Caudipteryx. Paul in 2010 estimated the length at one metre, the weight at seven kilogrammes. Similicaudipteryx also differed from its relatives by possessing a dagger-shaped pygostyle (the bone at the end of the tail to which feathers anchor in birds) consisting of the two most extreme tail vertebrae and several unique features of the back vertebrae. The pubic bone was exceptionally long relative to the ilium. The only other oviraptorosaur reported to have a pygostyle is Nomingia, though the feature is widespread in more advanced birds and appears to have evolved at least twice.

The holotype specimen lacks traces of feathers, but He and colleagues speculated that they were probably present based on its pygostyle, the anchor point of long tail feathers (rectrices) in modern birds.

== Phylogeny ==
Similicaudipteryx was by its describers assigned to the Caudipteridae. An exact cladistic analysis of its position was not performed.

== See also ==
- Timeline of oviraptorosaur research
