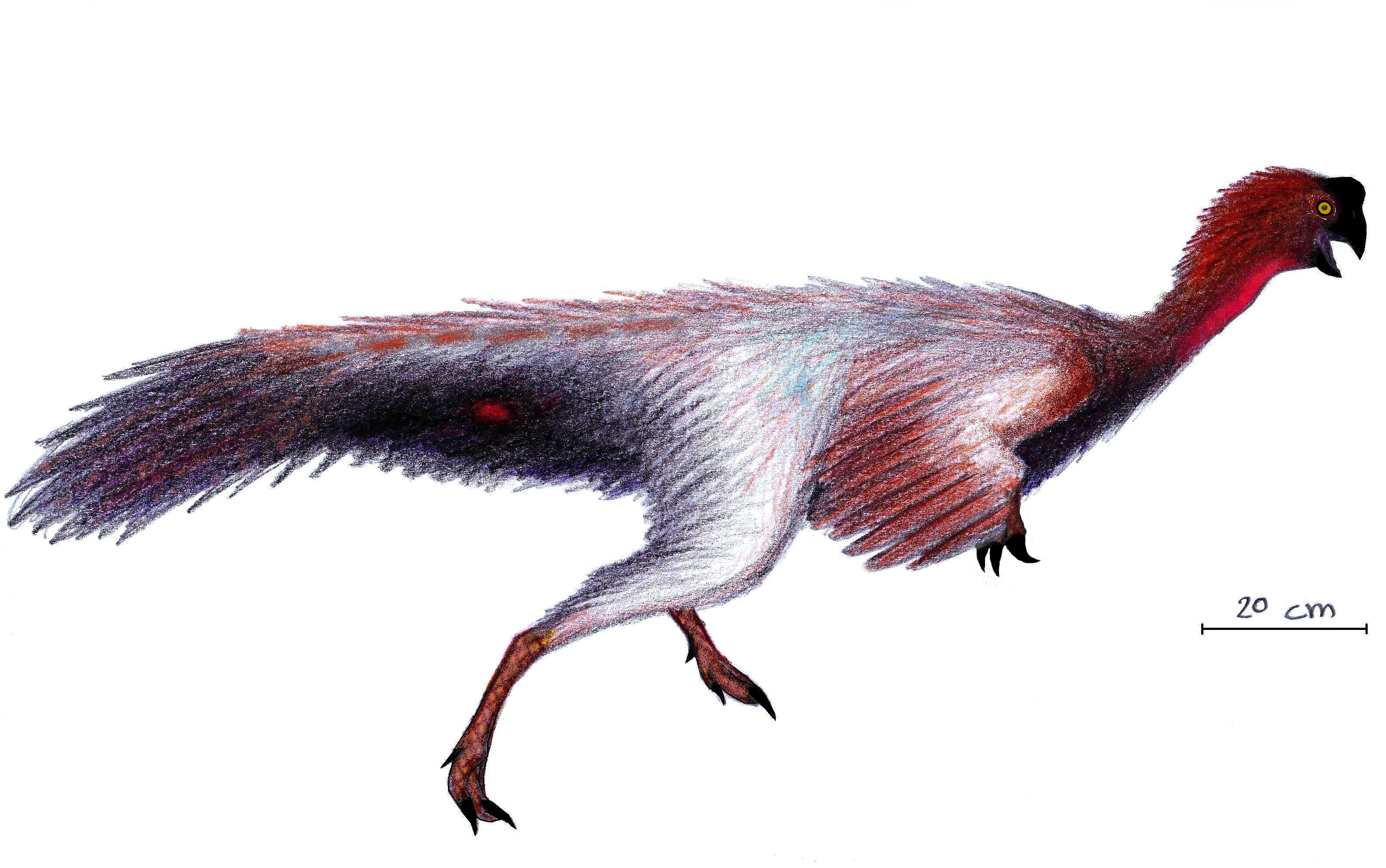
- Restoration

Scientific classification
- Kingdom: Animalia
- Phylum: Chordata
- Class: Reptilia
- Clade: Dinosauria
- Clade: Saurischia
- Clade: Theropoda
- Family: †Oviraptoridae
- Genus: †Jiangxisaurus; Wei et al., 2013
- Species: †J. ganzhouensis

Binomial name
- †Jiangxisaurus ganzhouensis Wei et al., 2013

= Jiangxisaurus =

Jiangxisaurus Temporal range: Late Cretaceous, 72–66 Ma

Extinct genus of dinosaurs

Jiangxisaurus is an extinct genus of oviraptorid theropod dinosaur from the Late Cretaceous Nanxiong Formation of southern China. It was similar to Heyuannia, but with more strongly curved anterior claws and a thinner, frailer mandible. This find is paleontologically significant because it contributes to current knowledge about the paleogeographical distribution of oviraptorids in southern China. It was most likely an omnivorous animal along with its close relatives Nankangia and Ganzhousaurus.

== Etymology ==
The genus name Jiangxisaurus, refers to the Jiangxi Province of southern China. The specific name ganzhouensis, is derived from Ganzhou, the locality where the specimen was discovered. Jiangxisaurus was described and named by Wei Xuefang, Pu Hanyong, Xu Li, Liu Di, and Lü Junchang in 2013 and the type species is Jiangxisaurus ganzhouensis.

== Description ==
The holotype specimen HGM41-HIII0421 consists of an incomplete skull, a lower jaw, eight cervical vertebrae, three dorsal vertebrae, nine caudal vertebrae, a nearly complete pectoral girdle, two chevrons, the left forelimb, both sternal plates, four sternal ribs, nine dorsal ribs, and a partially preserved pelvic girdle. The skull is 150mm long and appears to be a sub-adult. The mandible of Jiangxisaurus is toothless and has a height-to-length ratio of about 20%. The radius is 96mm in length and is 30% shorter than the length of the humerus (136mm). The manus is tridactyl, meaning that it has three fingers – the first digit is robust, the second is elongated and the third digit is slender.

== Classification ==
Jiangxisaurus was assigned to the taxon Oviraptoridae. This genus shares several traits with other oviraptorids, including a short narrow skull with a toothless jaw, and anterior cervical vertebrae that bear pleurocoels. In contrast to its nearest relatives, Jiangxisaurus has an elongated mandible and a less pronounced down-turned rostrum on its lower jaw.

=== Distinguishing anatomical features ===
A diagnosis is a statement of the anatomical features of an organism (or group) that collectively distinguish it from all other organisms. Some, but not all, of the features in a diagnosis are also autapomorphies. An autapomorphy is a distinctive anatomical feature that is unique to a given organism.

According to Wei et al. (2013), Jiangxisaurus was a medium-sized oviraptorid dinosaur characterized by the following unique characters:

- the presence of a weakly down-turned mandibular symphysis
- a suprangular bone with an elongated and concave lateral surface
- a very elongated mandible, with a height-to-length ratio of about 20%
- a ratio of radius length to humerus length of about 70%

== Paleoecology ==
=== Provenance and occurrence ===
The only known specimen of this genus was recovered at the Nankang locality of the Nanxiong Formation in Ganzhou City of Jiangxi Province, China. The specimen was collected in red sandstone sediments that were deposited during the Maastrichtian stage of the Cretaceous period, approximately 72 to 66 million years ago. The type specimen is currently housed at the Henan Geological Museum (HGM).

=== Fauna and habitat ===
The Nanxiong Formation consists of a 2000-meter sequence of red sandstones and clays which has yielded dinosaur fossils, dinosaur footprints and abundant egg shells. Jiangxisaurus shared its paleoenvironment with the sauropod Gannansaurus, the duckbill Microhadrosaurus, the therizinosauroid Nanshiungosaurus, the tyrannosaurid Qianzhousaurus and other oviraptorids, Banji, ‘’Tongtianlong’’, ‘’Shixinggia’’,‘’Nankangia’’,‘’Corythoraptor’’,’’Huanansaurus’’ and Ganzhousaurus.

== See also ==
- Timeline of oviraptorosaur research
