= Qianzhousaurus =

Qianzhousaurus Temporal range: Late Cretaceous, ~67–66 Ma
- Reconstructed holotype skeleton, National Natural History Museum of China

Scientific classification
- Kingdom: Animalia
- Phylum: Chordata
- Class: Reptilia
- Clade: Dinosauria
- Clade: Saurischia
- Clade: Theropoda
- Superfamily: †Tyrannosauroidea
- Family: †Tyrannosauridae
- Subfamily: †Tyrannosaurinae
- Tribe: †Alioramini
- Genus: †Qianzhousaurus; Lü et al., 2014

Type species
- †Qianzhousaurus sinensis Lü et al., 2014

Synonyms
- Alioramus sinensis? Carr et al., 2017

Extinct genus of dinosaurs

Qianzhousaurus (meaning "Qianzhou lizard") is a genus of tyrannosaurid dinosaur that lived in Asia during the Maastrichtian age of the Late Cretaceous period. There is currently only one species named, the type species Qianzhousaurus sinensis, which is a member of the tribe Alioramini and most closely related to Alioramus, the only other known alioramin.

== History of discovery ==
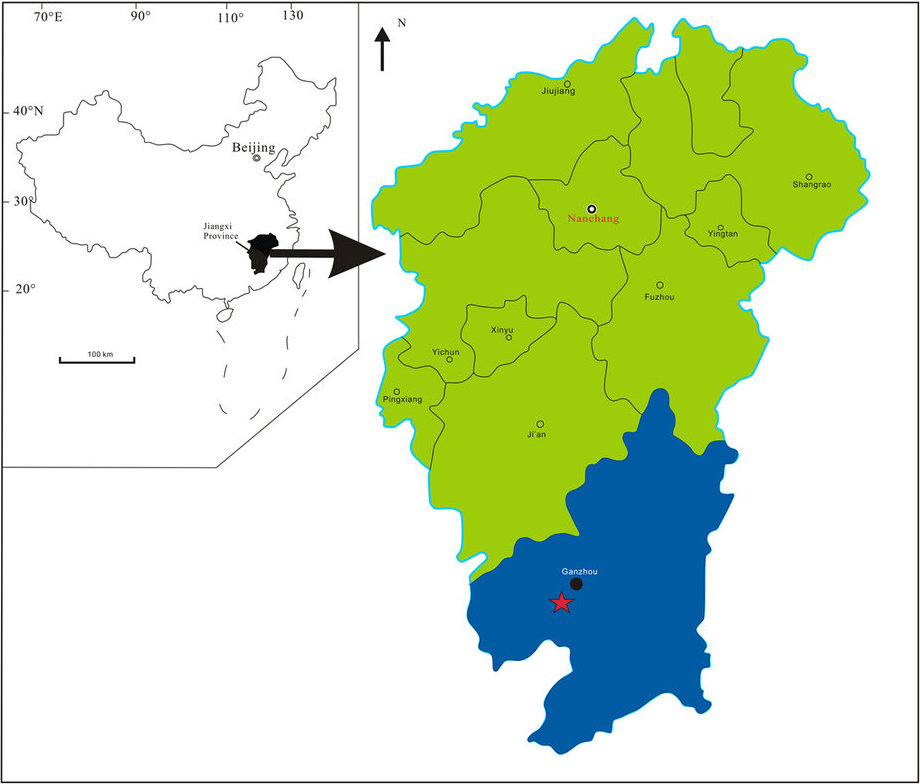
Map showing the locality of the Ganzhou city, region where the holotype was discovered

The holotype specimen, GM F10004, was unearthed in southern China, Ganzhou, at the Nanxiong Formation in the summer of 2010 during the construction of an industrial park and it was first described by paleontologists Junchang Lü, Laiping Yi, Stephen L. Brusatte, Ling Yang, Hua Li and Liu Chen in the journal Nature Communications in 2014. The genus is known from a partial sub-adult individual consisting of a nearly complete skull with the lower jaws missing all teeth (lost during fossilization), 9 cervical vertebrae, 3 dorsal vertebrae, 18 caudal vertebrae, both scapulocoracoids, partial ilia, and the left leg compromising the femur, tibia, fibula, astragalus with calcaneum, and metatarsals III and IV. The generic name, Qianzhousaurus, is in reference to Qianzhou (the older name of Ganzhou) where the remains were discovered, and the specific name, sinensis, is derived from the Greek word Σῖναι (sin, sino, sinai) in reference to China. The fossil remains were discovered by workmen at a construction site near the city of Ganzhou, who then took them to a local museum.

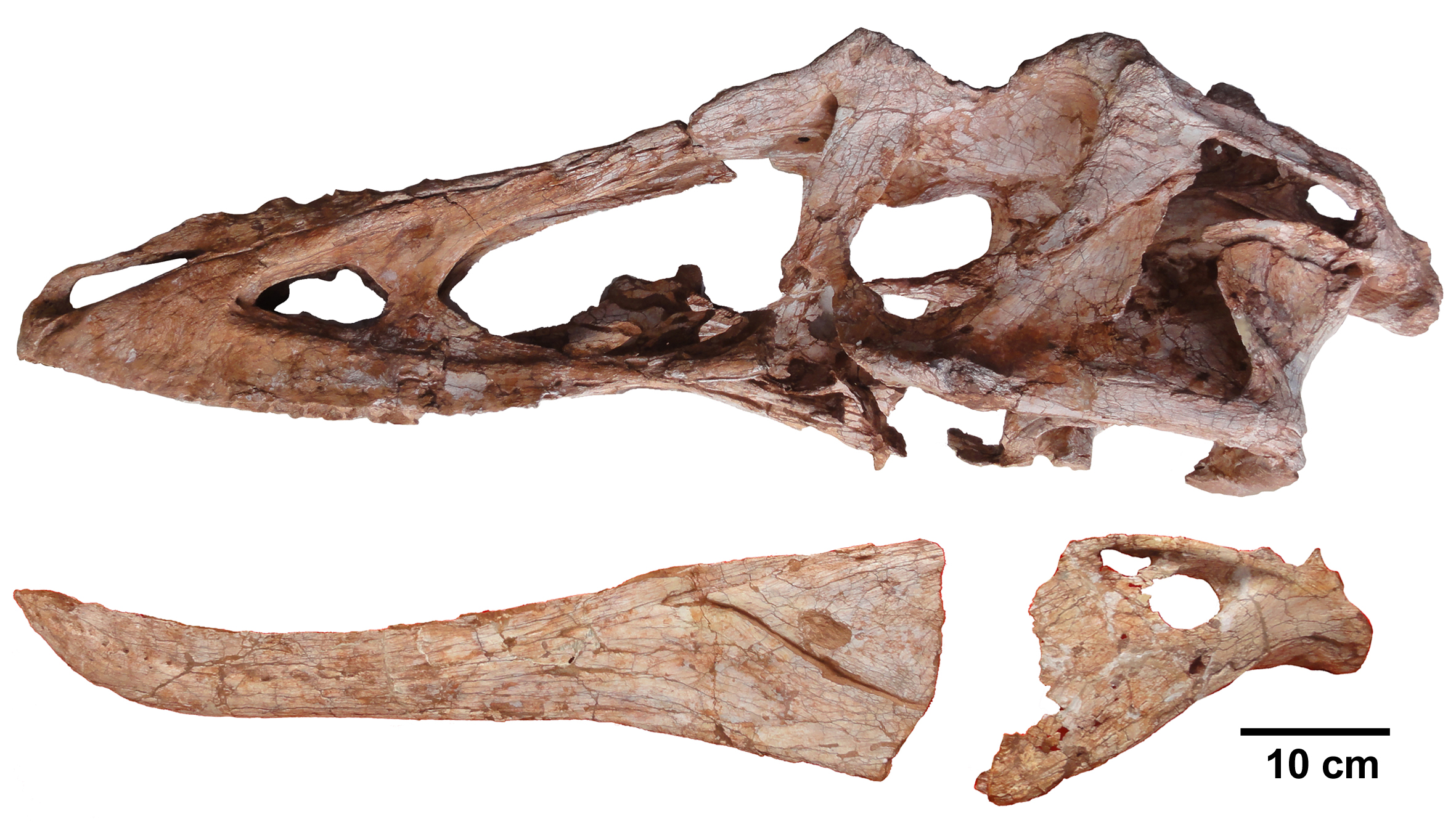
Holotype skull

Lead author Lü Junchang from the Institute of Geology, Chinese Academy of Geological Sciences stated that "the new discovery is very important. Along with Alioramus from Mongolia, it shows that the long-snouted tyrannosaurids were widely distributed in Asia. Although we are only starting to learn about them, the long-snouted tyrannosaurs were apparently one of the main groups of predatory dinosaurs in Asia." The existence of long-snouted tyrannosaurs was previously suspected due to other inconclusive fossil finds which could be explained as the juveniles of short-snouted species, but co-author Stephen L. Brusatte from the University of Edinburgh reveals that the find "tells us pretty unequivocally that these long-snouted tyrannosaurs were a real thing. They were a different breed, living right at the end of the age of dinosaurs."

== Description ==
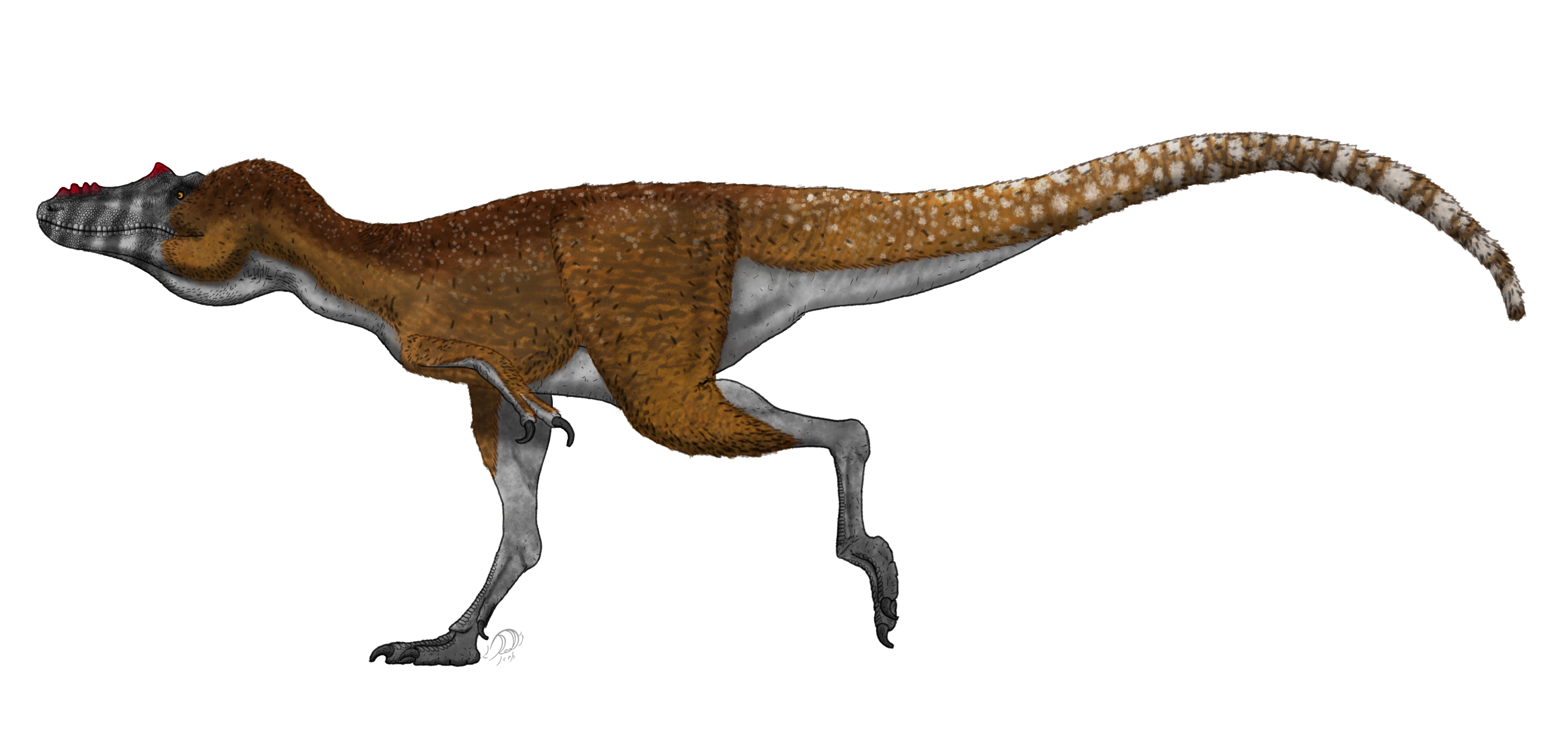
Life restoration

Qianzhousaurus was a medium-sized tyrannosaurid estimated at 6.3 m (20.7 ft) in length, 2 m (6.6 ft) in hip height and 750–757 kg (1,653–1,669 lb) in body mass. Higher estimates suggest that it could have reached a maximum length between 7.5 and 9 metres (24.6 and 29.5 ft). The taxon can be differentiated from other tyrannosaurids in having a highly narrowed premaxilla, a pneumatic opening on the upper extension of the maxilla, and the lack of a vertical ridge-like structure on the lateral surface of the ilium.

Unlike more "traditional" tyrannosaurids, which had prominent deep-set jaws and thick teeth, Qianzhousaurus had a particularly elongated snout, with (when restored) narrow teeth. The holotype specimen is notably larger and more mature than the holotypes of both species of Alioramus. However, since some sutures between the cervical and dorsal vertebrae are partially fused, the holotype seems to have come from an immature animal, likely a sub-adult. Qianzhousaurus was a long-legged animal with a 70 cm (28 in) long femur and 76 cm (30 in) long tibia.

== Classification ==
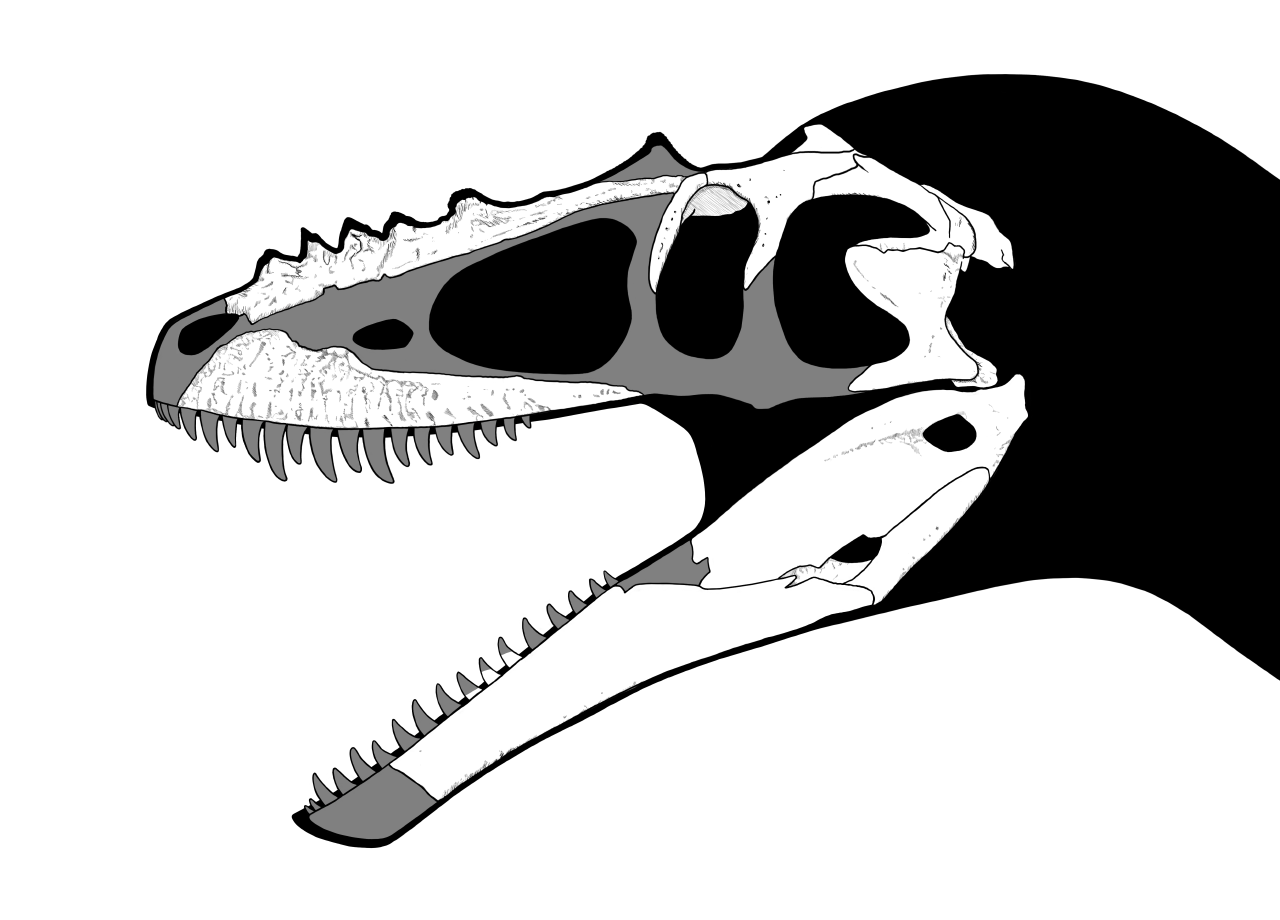
Holotype skull diagram of A. remotus, which together with A. altai, form the closest relatives of Qianzhousaurus

The discovery of Qianzhousaurus led to a new branch of the tyrannosaur family being named, consisting of the long-snouted Q. sinensis and the two known species of Alioramus. This clade, named the tribe Alioramini, had an uncertain placement relative to other members of the tyrannosaur branch in the initial analysis that discovered it. The primary phylogenetic analysis found Alioramini to be closer to Tyrannosaurus than to Albertosaurus, and therefore a member of the group Tyrannosaurinae. However, a second analysis in the same paper found it to be located outside of the clade including Albertosaurinae and Tyrannosaurinae, and therefore the sister group of Tyrannosauridae. Below is the first analysis found by the authors:

- Tyrannosauridae
  - Albertosaurinae
    - Gorgosaurus
    - Albertosaurus
  - Tyrannosaurinae
    - Alioramini
      - Qianzhousaurus
      - Alioramus altai
      - Alioramus remotus
    - - Teratophoneus
      - - Daspletosaurus
        - - Tyrannosaurus
          - Tarbosaurus

Thomas D. Carr with colleagues in 2017 regarded Qianzhousaurus as a junior synonym of Alioramus based on the reasoning that they were recovered as sister species in their phylogenetic analysis. Despite their argument, they indicated that this synonymy does not necessarily constitute a taxonomic reevaluation of the Alioramini. However, Foster and his colleagues conducted a detailed redescription of the holotype skull of Qianzhousaurus in 2022, finding several traits unique to this genus, hence supporting the separation of Alioramus and Qianzhousaurus.

== Paleobiology ==
=== Ontogeny ===
Qianzhousaurus (in blue) compared to other members of the Alioramini

A 2022 study of the three known species of the two known alioramin genera, Qianzhousaurus and Alioramus (A. altai and A. remotus), respectively, suggests that the variation seen between the various species is consistent with the growth trends seen in other tyrannosaurid genera, though specimens that could constitute a full growth series from infant to adult for each species have not been recovered for any of these theropods. Of these, Qianzhousaurus represents the largest and most mature animal found within Alioramini thus far and represents the adult level of maturity. One part of the growth series across all specimens in this study was discovered to remain unique to alioramin tyrannosaurs, this being the rugose process of the jugal starts out small and conical, but becomes massive and indistinct as the animals grow. This same study also suggests Alioramins did not undergo a secondary metamorphosis from slender juveniles to robust adults like other tyrannosaurs, but maintained a unique physiology better suited to pursuit of fast prey.

=== Feeding ===
In 2022, Foster and his colleagues indicated that Qianzhousaurus and other alioramins, due to their slim and gracile build, may have been hunters of small, particularly fast and nimble prey, which would have allowed these tyrannosaurids to avoid competition with larger, robust relatives that specialized in killing larger animals. The long and delicate snouts of alioramins like Alioramus and Qianzhousaurus may have prevented them from killing the same prey that juvenile and adult tyrannosaurids like Tarbosaurus hunted, though these larger tyrannosaurs themselves may have hunted alioramins as prey on occasion. Alioramins may also have had a different feeding strategy than other tyrannosaurids, as their jaws seem to have been weaker than those of the larger genera and even juveniles of larger species have proportionately higher bite forces than alioramins of equivalent size. Furthermore, Alioramini seemingly remained confined to Asia, suggesting that some factor prevented them from colonizing the better-sampled fossil deposits from North America. What this may be remains a mystery at the present moment.

Studies of the skulls of various tyrannosauroids in 2024 suggest that Qianzhousaurus and other alioramin tyrannosaurs experienced lower stresses when biting and feeding. Additional evidence in the same study suggests that Qianzhousaurus did not utilize the "puncture-and-pull" feeding method utilized by other, larger genera of tyrannosaurids.

== Paleoenvironment ==
Qianzhousaurus is known from the Nanxiong Formation, which has been dated to the latest Maastrichtian age of the Late Cretaceous period, about 66.7 ± 0.3 million years ago based on argon–argon dating. The main lithology of this formation is composed by purplish mudstones and siltstones, deposited in a floodplain environment under a relatively warm, humid tropical climate. Oviraptorid eggs are particularly common across the formation with numerous well-preserved egg clutches or nests, as well as nesting individuals. The Nanxiong Formation has been noted for its abundant oviraptorosaur genera. It is most likely that, given the poor stratigraphic analysis of the formation, the extremely large oviraptorosaur diversity of this formation was temporally separated. The presence of the smaller and more robustly built tyrannosaurine Asiatyrannus also suggests that Qianzhousaurus was filling the role of apex predator in the formation's ecosystem, with Asiatyrannus occupying a different niche and hunting different prey than its larger relative.

Other vertebrates in the Nanxiong Formation include numerous oviraptorosaurs, such as Banji, Ganzhousaurus, Corythoraptor, Nankangia, Huanansaurus, Shixinggia, or Tongtianlong; the hadrosaurid Microhadrosaurus (may be nomen dubium); the sauropod Gannansaurus; the therizinosaurid Nanshiungosaurus; the crocodilian Jiangxisuchus; the squamates Chianghsia and Tianyusaurus; and the turtles Jiangxichelys and Nanhsiungchelys.

== See also ==
- Timeline of tyrannosaur research
