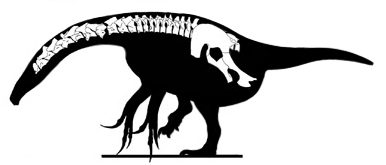
- Skeletal restoration of the holotype

Scientific classification
- Kingdom: Animalia
- Phylum: Chordata
- Class: Reptilia
- Clade: Dinosauria
- Clade: Saurischia
- Clade: Theropoda
- Superfamily: †Therizinosauroidea
- Family: †Therizinosauridae
- Genus: †Nanshiungosaurus; Dong, 1979

Type species
- †Nanshiungosaurus brevispinus Dong, 1979

= Nanshiungosaurus =

Nanshiungosaurus Temporal range: Late Cretaceous, ~67–66 Ma

Extinct genus of dinosaurs

Nanshiungosaurus (meaning "Nanxiong's lizard") is a genus of therizinosaurid dinosaur that lived in what is now South China during the Late Cretaceous. The type species, Nanshiungosaurus brevispinus, was first discovered in 1974 and described in 1979 by Dong Zhiming. It is represented by a single specimen preserving most of the cervical and dorsal vertebrae with the pelvis. A supposed and unlikely second species, "Nanshiungosaurus" bohlini, was found in 1992 and described in 1997. It is also represented by vertebrae but this species, however, differs in geological age and lacks authentic characteristics compared to the type, making its affinity to the genus unsupported.

It was a large-sized therizinosaurid that is estimated to have reached nearly 5 m (16 ft) in length and to have weighed about 600–907 kg (1,323–2,000 lb). Nanshiungosaurus had a very pneumatized vertebral column with the posterior cervical vertebrae of the long neck being unusually robust and slightly more elongated than the dorsals. It was equipped with a broad torso as seen on the bulky pelvis. As for other therizinosaurids, it had a keratinous beak used when feeding, stocky feet with four weight-bearing toes and large flattened claws.

Along with Therizinosaurus and Segnosaurus, Nanshiungosaurus was one of the earliest therizinosaurs to be described and named. The unusual shape of the pelvis led Dong, the original describer, to interpret the remains as belonging to a dwarf sauropod, but during the 1990s the genus was recognized as a segnosaur (now therizinosaur) based on the pelvic similarities with Segnosaurus. At first, the research on therizinosaurs was complicated since sparse remains were known at the time and these had features from multiple dinosaur lineages leading to their interpretation as prosauropod dinosaurs.

== History of discovery ==
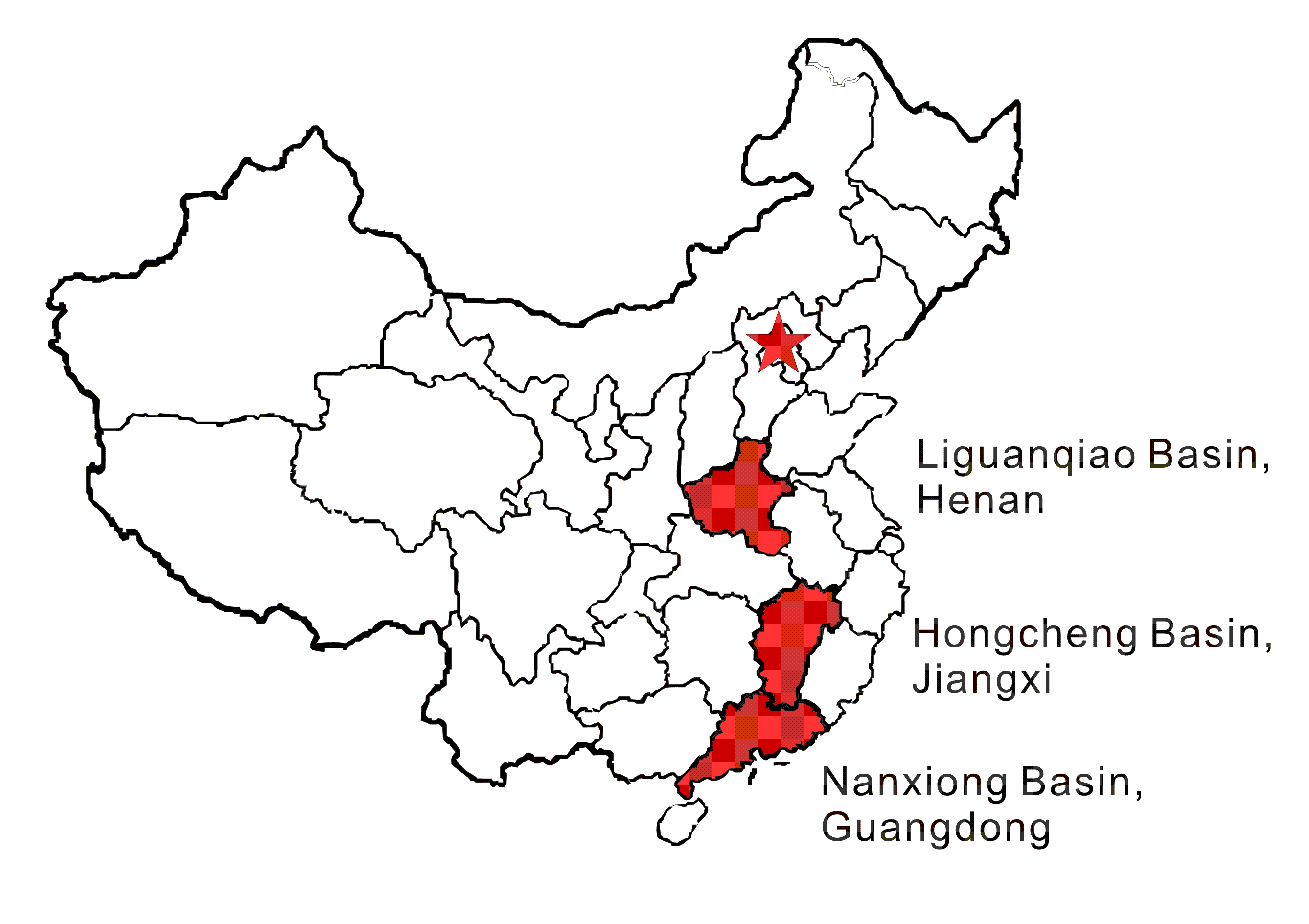
Fossiliferous basins in China. The holotype of Nanshiungosaurus was discovered at the Nanxiong Basin

In 1974, during a geological expedition at the Nanxiong Basin led by the Institute of Vertebrate Paleontology and Paleoanthropology several fossilized remains of dinosaurs were discovered by the team. Near the village of Dapingcun at the Nanxiong Formation, Guangdong Province, a relatively large and partial skeleton was found in articulation dating back to the Late Cretaceous. The specimen was labelled under the number IVPP V4731 and consisted of 12 cervical (lacking the atlas), 10 dorsal, 5 (actually 6) sacral and the first caudal vertebrae with a nearly complete, bulky pelvis only lacking the right ilium and ischium. Later on, in 1979 the specimen was formally described by the Chinese paleontologist Dong Zhiming and used as the basis for the new genus and species Nanshiungosaurus brevispinus. The generic name, Nanshiungosaurus, refers to the site of provenance Nanxiong city and is derived from the Greek σαῦρος (sauros, meaning lizard). Lastly, the specific name, brevispinus, is derived from the Latin brevis and spina (meaning short and spine, respectively) in reference to the relatively short vertebral spines. When first described, Dong mistakenly thought the specimen to have been a dwarf, strange titanosaurine sauropod characterized by a shorter but thicker neck than other sauropods based on the pelvis structure.

In 1997 Dong Zhiming and You Hailu named and described a supposed second species: "Nanshiungosaurus" bohlini, based on a skeleton found in 1992 near Mazongshan. It consists of 11 cervical and 5 dorsal vertebrae with some ribs. The specimen is catalogued as IVPP V11116 coming from the Early Cretaceous, Upper Xinminbao Group. Also, they coined the Nanshiungosauridae to contain "both species". Dong and Yu presented no evidence or argumentation supporting the assignment of the species to Nanshiungosaurus. In 2010, the North American paleontologist Lindsay Zanno considered this referral to be highly improbable since "N". bohlini dates back from the Barremian-Aptian ages and in the view of lack of synapomorphies, she considered that the supposed second species is unrelated to Nanshiungosaurus and might warrant its own genus. In addition, she corrected the number of sacral vertebrae from 5 to 6 and noted that the holotype pelvis from the latter has suffered damage since collection and has been reconstructed with painted plaster in the affected areas. Moreover, the remains of "N". bohlini were recovered from the lower red beds of the Zhonggou Formation in the Gongpoquan Basin, a completely different geological context. As an overall consensus, this dubious specimen is no longer considered to be relatable to Nanshiungosaurus.

== Description ==
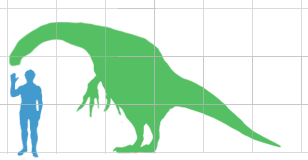
Size compared to a human

Nanshiungosaurus was a relatively large-bodied therizinosaurid, estimated at 5 m (16 ft) long weighing 600–907 kg (1,323–2,000 lb). This taxon can be differentiated by the possession of stocky posterior-most cervical vertebrae with opisthocoel (meaning that they were concave on their posterior sides) centra. Like other derived (advanced) therizinosaurids, Nanshiungosaurus was a pot-bellied animal that had a strong build composed of stout hindlimbs with a functionally tetradactyl pes. The arms ended up in large, recurved claws that were side to side flattened. Though the holotype specimen lacks cranial material, the preserved elements in therizinosaurids Erlikosaurus and Segnosaurus indicate that it had a relatively small skull with coarsely serrated teeth, and developed a prominent rhamphotheca (keratinous beak).

=== Vertebral column ===
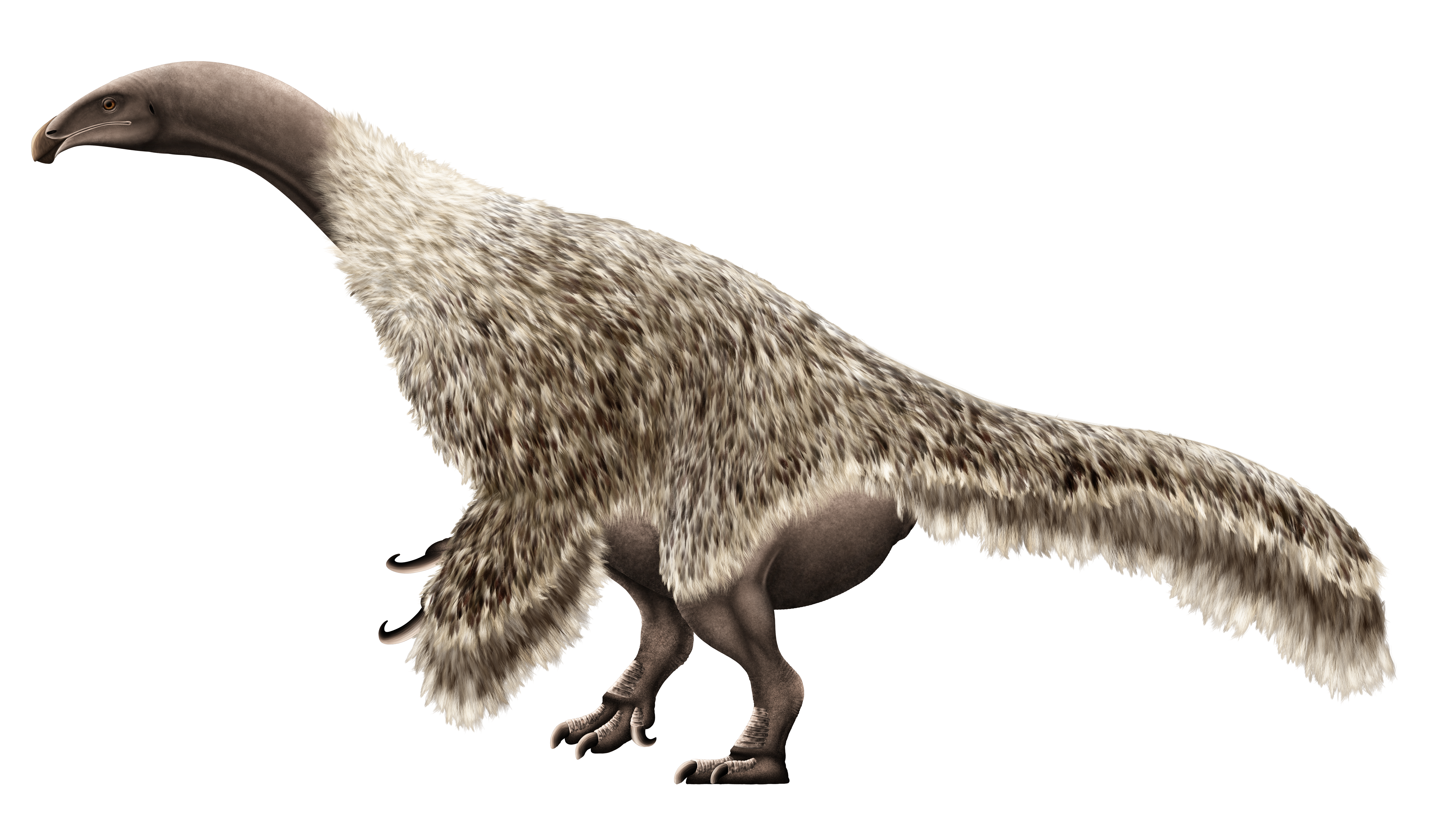
Life restoration

Most cervicals have relatively short neural arches, but in the dorsals they are more elongated. The axis is well preserved and has a length of 13.5 cm (135 mm) with platycoelus (slightly concave at both ends) centra. Its odontoid process is fused with the anterior facet of centrum and has a blunt depression to the bottom area in order to articulate with the atlas centrum. The neural arch is narrow, the neural spine has a posterior orientation, and has rounded facets that connect with the atlantal posterior articular processes (bony projections). After the axis, the next cervicals gradually increase in size. The anterior cervicals have platycoelus centra and deep, pocket-like pleurocoels (small holes) develop on the lateral sides; a small ridge-like structure is also present. On the bottom surface, the centra are flat, gently flattened to the inner sides, and two projections originate from the borders of the centra. The anterior capitular process is compressed (flattened) with some degree of thickness, and extends from the bottom to lateral sides to be fused with the capitulum on the ribs. As for most cervicals, the neural arches and spines are short, the anterior articular processes are strongly developed in that direction, and the anterior lobes of the diapophyses (bony projections to the lateral sides) extend to the bottom and lateral directions to articulate with tubercles. Seventh and eighth cervicals are the longest with 18 cm (180 mm) long centra and posterior to them, the vertebral size slightly narrows. In most posterior cervicals, the centra are opisthocoelous with shallow posterior grooves.

The dorsal vertebrae centra, unlike in the cervicals, are narrow and platycoelous with an average length of 7 cm (70 mm). They are also pneumatic with shallow pneumatopores (pits leading to air pockets) on the lateral sides, but they reduce in size on posterior dorsals. Along with the centra, the neural arch are well pneumatized with most of the pneumatic areas filled with matrix (sediments). The capitular processes are undeveloped and replaced by poor rounded facets on the anterior surface of the centrum. In most dorsals, the neural spines are very elongated, the articular processes are located within the ligaments of the centrum, the neural spines are stocky, side to side thickened, and the top regions have stout tuberosities. A prominent spiral-like ridge is present on the bottom surface that becomes more notable to the posterior direction. Though most dorsals are completely preserved, eighth through tenth dorsals have damaged centra. On the posterior series the centra become platycoelous, approaching the sacral vertebrae structure. The sacrum is composed by six (originally five) sacral vertebrae and they are fused into a single structure, indicating that the individual was an adult at the time of death. They are lightly more longer than the dorsals and have stocky, side to ide broadened neural spines with the top surfaces bearing small depressions. A single caudal vertebra is present after the sacral series and represents the first caudal. Its neural spine is broken and the centrum is slightly amphicoelous (concave on both ends) with sub-equal height and length.

=== Pelvic girdle ===
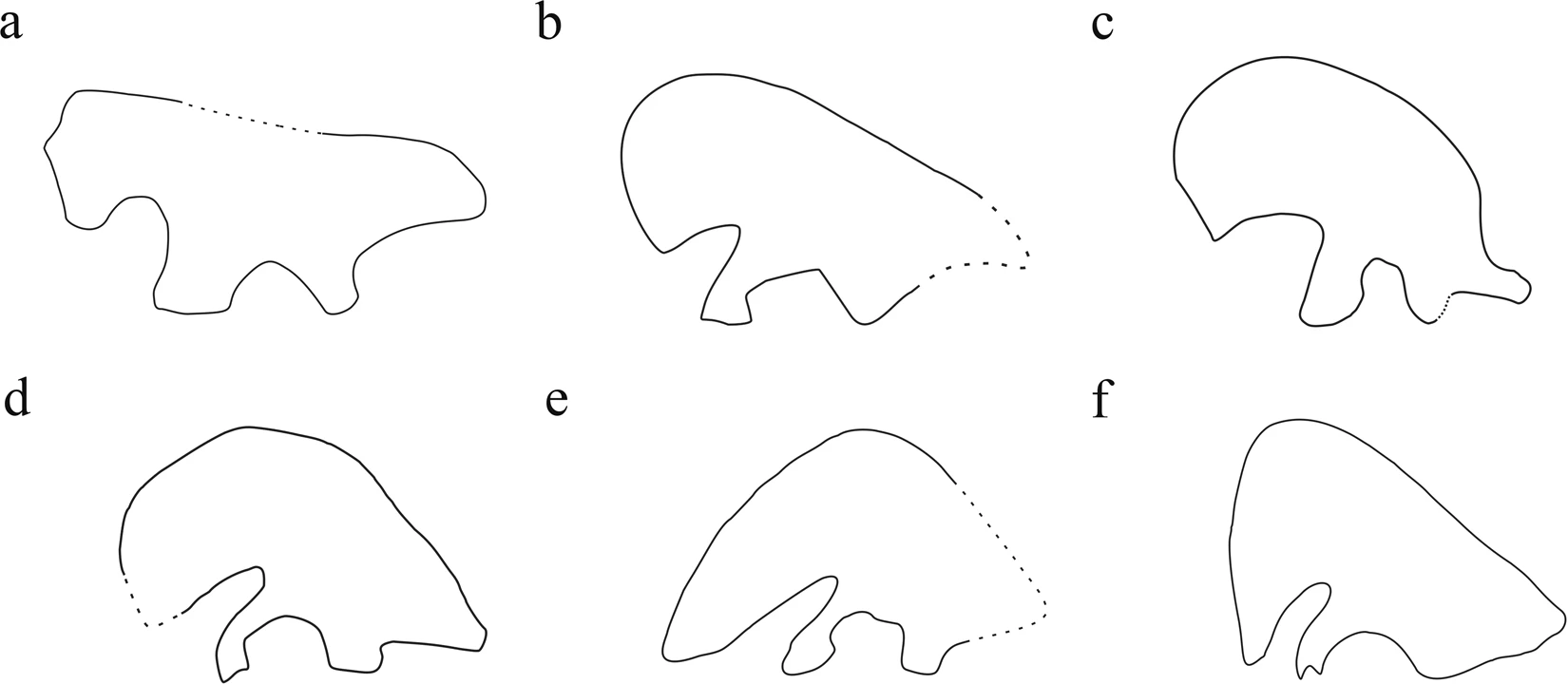
Schematic comparison of the ilium of Nanshiungosaurus (in E) compared to other therizinosaurs

The pelvis is represented by the well-preserved left side composed by the ilium, pubis and both ischia; the right ilium and pubis were eroded though. As a whole, the pelvis is robustly built and some elements are deformed such as the left ilium, which due to taphonomical factors has been bent out of shape. Like other derived therizinosaurids, the pelvis has an opisthopubic condition where the pubis and ischium are fused and directed backwards. The ilium is stocky with an extremely well-developed and elongated preacetabular process (anterior expansion of the iliac blade), nevertheless, the postacetabular process (posterior expansion) is missing. Its pubic peduncle (a robust projection that connects to the pubis) is also well-developed, being straight and thick at the end. The acetabulum (hip socket in the middle) is large and relatively circular in shape. The pubic bone has lost its lower end and is well-fused to the ischial bone. The ischium is relatively thin, expanded, and the obturator process (a notably large projection at the end) is broken.

== Classification ==
Nanshiungosaurus was in 1979 by Dong assigned to the Titanosaurinae, based on the assumption it was a sauropod genus, more specifically a titanosaurine (titanosaur). During this same year, the paleontologist Altangerel Perle described and named Segnosaurus also erecting the Segnosauridae to contain this strange taxon. After the findings of Nanshiungosaurus and Segnosaurus, more complete relatives started to be discovered, but their anatomical traits were so aberrant compared to other theropods to the point of being considered as Late Cretaceous sauropodomorph dinosaurs. In 1990, the paleontologists Rinchen Barsbold and Teresa Maryańska noted the striking similarities between the pelvises of Nanshiungosaurus and Segnosaurus, such as the ophisthopubic condition and large iliac blade. They concluded that the former was part of the Segnosauria and found this group to be a rare and aberrant group of saurischians in a position subject to change among sauropodomorphs and theropods. Dong also agreed with these similarities and placed the genus within the Segnosauridae in 1992. Nevertheless, the description of Alxasaurus in 1993 proved that the long-aberrant segnosaurs were tetanuran theropod dinosaurs and Segnosauridae was a junior synonym of the older name Therizinosauridae. Segnosauria also became synonymous with Therizinosauria. In 1997, with the description and naming of "N". bohlini, Dong and You placed the therizinosaurids Nanshiungosaurus and the former into a separate Nanshiungosauridae. They did not provide authentic traits or bases behind this new grouping. In 2010, Zanno performed one of the most complete analyses of the Therizinosauria at that point and noted that these two species do not pertain to the same genus and therefore the use of the Nanshiungosauridae was invalid and represents a synonym of Therizinosauridae.

Nanshiungosaurus features multiple therizinosaurid traits such as an ophisthopubic pelvis, elongated iliac blade and an expanded obturator process. In her phylogenetic analysis, Zanno recovered this taxon as a derived therizinosaurid closer to Nothronychus and Segnosaurus. The therizinosaurid placement of Nanshiungosaurus has been widely followed and corroborated by most cladistic analyses. The extensive phylogenetic analysis conducted by Hartman and colleagues in 2019 based on Zanno's 2010 analysis, recovers Nanshiungosaurus in a more derived position than Neimongosaurus or Therizinosaurus. Below are the obtained results:

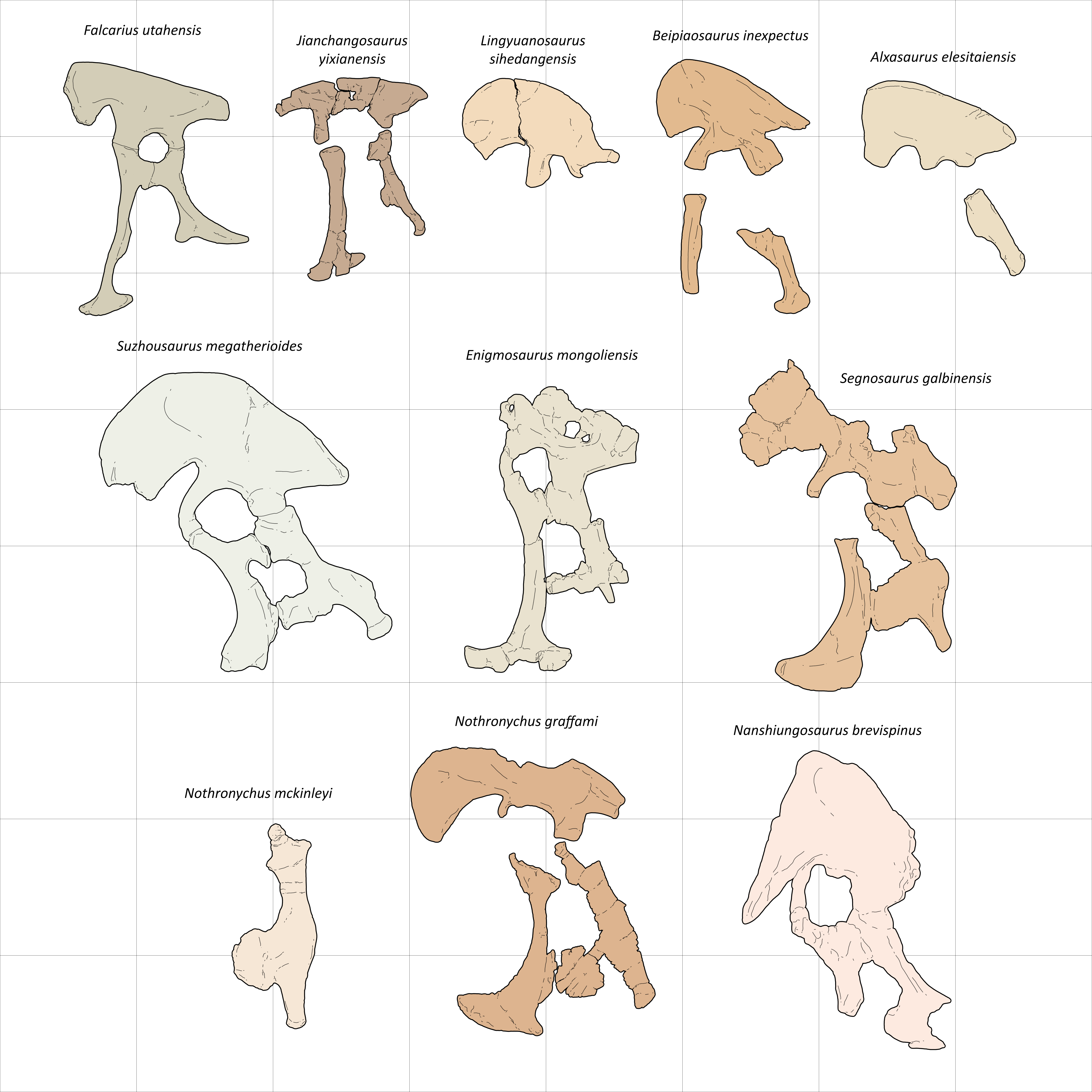
Hip variation among therizinosaur genera (Nanshiungosaurus in right corner)

- Therizinosauridae
  - - Suzhousaurus
    - - Neimongosaurus
      - - Therizinosaurus
        - Erliansaurus
  - - Nanchao embryos
    - - Nanshiungosaurus
      - - - Segnosaurus
          - AMNH 6368
        - - - Erlikosaurus
            - Nothronychus mckinleyi
            - Nothronychus graffami

== Paleoecology ==
Nanshiungosaurus was one of the last therizinosaurs to exist. The fossil remains were unearthed from the Nanxiong Formation, which has been dated to the latest Maastrichtian stage about 66.7 ± 0.3 million years ago. This formation is mainly composed by purplish mudstones and siltstones, and was deposited in a floodplain environment, under a relatively warm, humid subtropical climate. Oviraptorid eggs are particularly common on the formation with at least five well-preserved egg clutches. Moreover, a fossilized female oviraptorid with two eggs is known from the formation. The tracks of ornithopod dinosaurs are locally abundant at the Nanxiong region.

The therizinosaurid Nanshiungosaurus was a bulky high-browser in its ecosystem, and shared its habitat with multiple oviraptorosaur species such as Banji, Ganzhousaurus, Corythoraptor, Nankangia, Huanansaurus or Shixinggia. However, it is possible that some of these oviraptorosaurs did not actually live together given the poor stratigraphic analysis of the formation. Additional dinosaurs are represented by the fast-running, long-snouted tyrannosaurid Qianzhousaurus, the sauropod Gannansaurus, and the very sparse remains of hadrosaurid dinosaurs such as Microhadrosaurus (now a nomen dubium). Other reptiles that composed the fauna were the terrestrial or semiaquatic nanhsiungchelyid turtles Nanhsiungchelys and Jiangxichelys, squamates Chianghsia and Tianyusaurus, and the crocodilian Jiangxisuchus.

== See also ==
- Timeline of therizinosaur research
