= Microhadrosaurus =

Microhadrosaurus Temporal range: Late Cretaceous, 66.7–66 Ma

Scientific classification
- Kingdom: Animalia
- Phylum: Chordata
- Class: Reptilia
- Clade: Dinosauria
- Clade: †Ornithischia
- Clade: †Ornithopoda
- Family: †Hadrosauridae
- Genus: †Microhadrosaurus
- Species: †M. nanshiungensis

Binomial name
- †Microhadrosaurus nanshiungensis Dong, 1979

Extinct genus of dinosaurs

Microhadrosaurus (meaning "small bulky lizard" in Greek) is a genus of hadrosaurid dinosaur from the Late Cretaceous (Campanian or Maastrichtian) Nanxiong Formation of Guangdong, China. Although its name identifies it as a small hadrosaurid, it is based on juvenile remains, and the adult size is unknown.

== Description ==
Dong Zhiming named this genus for IVPP V4732, a partial lower jaw from a juvenile hadrosaur. This partial bone, with 18 columns of stacked teeth in a typical hadrosaur tooth battery, measures 37 centimeters long (15 inches). Dong later estimated the length of the individual at 2.6 meters (8.5 feet).

== History ==
Dong regarded this genus as much like Edmontosaurus, albeit in tiny form. However, Michael K. Brett-Surman, a hadrosaur specialist, regarded the material as showing no characteristics that would allow it to be differentiated from other duckbills. The most recent review accepts Brett-Surman's position, and regards Microhadrosaurus as a dubious name.

== Paleobiology ==
As a hadrosaurid, Microhadrosaurus would have been a bipedal/quadrupedal herbivore, eating plants with a sophisticated skull that permitted a grinding motion analogous to chewing, and was furnished with hundreds of continually-replaced teeth. Because it is only known from a partial jaw from a juvenile, little more than general information can be drawn from it at this point.

== Paleoecology ==
=== Fauna and habitat ===
The Nanxiong Formation consists of a 2000-meter sequence of red sandstones and clays which has yielded dinosaur fossils, dinosaur footprints and abundant egg shells. Microhadrosaurus shared its paleoenvironment with the sauropod Gannansaurus, the therizinosauroid Nanshiungosaurus, the tyrannosaurid Qianzhousaurus and the oviraptorids Banji, Jiangxisaurus, Corythoraptor, Ganzhousaurus, Huanansaurus, Nankangia and Tongtianlong.

== See also ==
- Timeline of hadrosaur research
