= Nanxiong Formation =

Geological formation in China

- Stratigraphic range: Maastrichtian; 66.7 Ma
- Type: Geological formation
- Underlies: Shanghu Formation
- Overlies: Jurassic granite basement, Changba Formation (Nanxiong Group)
- Thickness: ~300 m (980 ft); Several kilometers (Nanxiong Group)

Lithology
- Primary: Sandstone, siltstone, mudstone
- Other: Limestone, conglomerate

Location
- Coordinates: 23.5°N 114.9°E
- Approximate paleocoordinates: 23.8°N 110.5°E
- Region: Jiangxi Province, Guangdong Province
- Country: China
- Extent: Nanxiong Basin
- Nanxiong Formation (China) Nanxiong Formation (Guangdong)

The Nanxiong Formation (also known as Yuanpu Formation) is a Late Cretaceous geologic formation in Jiangxi and Guangdong Provinces. Dinosaur remains are among the fossils that have been recovered from the formation.

== Description ==
It consists of continental siliciclastic red beds, with fauna which similar to that of the Nemegt Formation. It has been dated to about 66.7 ± 0.3 million years ago. It is the lowest unit of the Nanxiong Basin, a small graben created during Mesozoic rifting. Buck et al. state that it overlies Jurassic granite basement, and is conformably overlain by the Shanghu Formation. Alternative stratigraphic schemes for the Nanxiong basin have been proposed, one of which refers to the Nanxiong succession as the Nanxiong Group, and dividing it into the Yuanpu, Zhutian and Zhenshui formations, and overlying the Albian to Turonian Changba Formation. The age of the Nanxiong basin as a whole has been constrained to 72 to 62.8 mya.

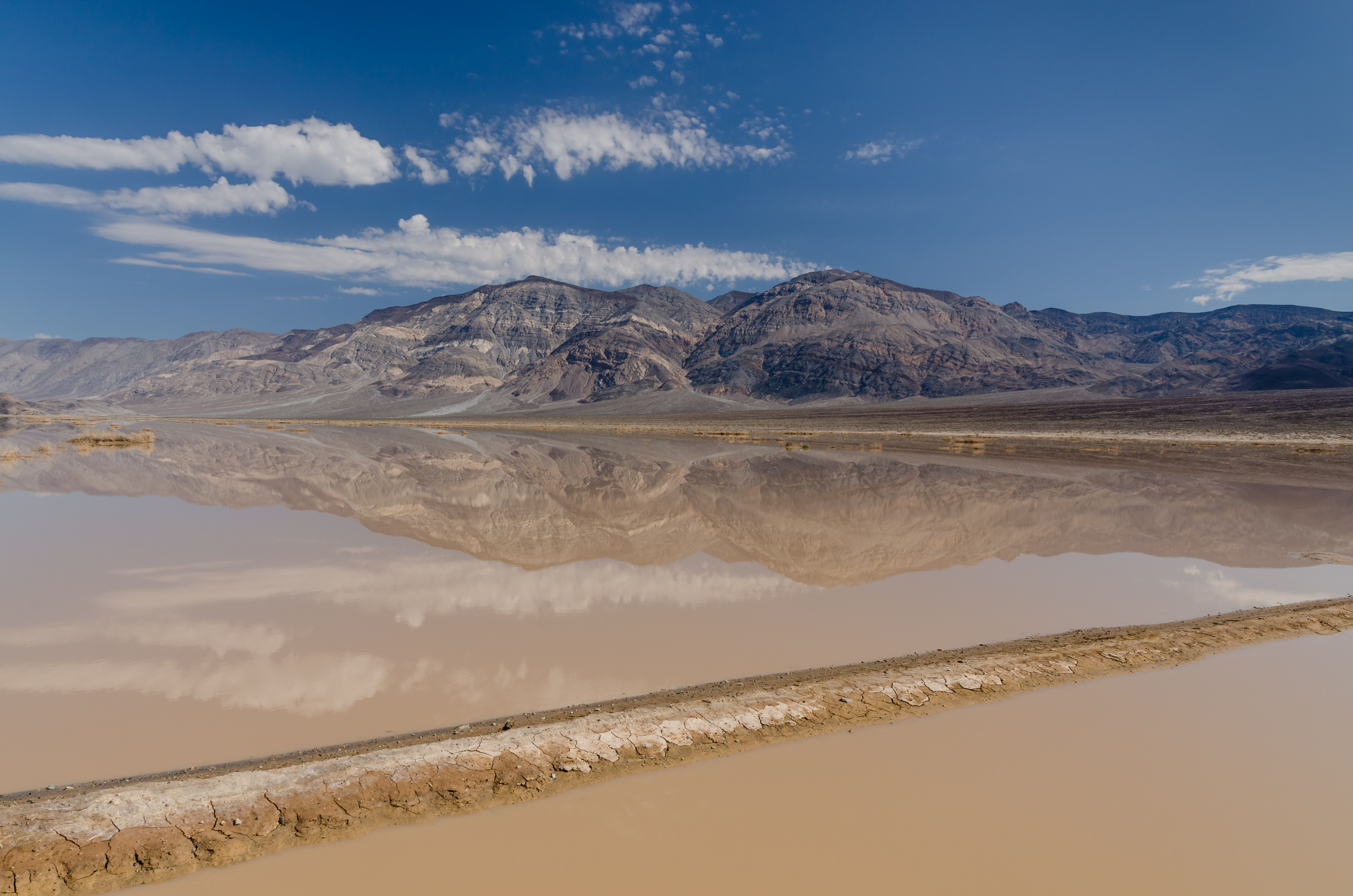
Saline lakes in the Nanxiong were temporary

The depositional environment is made up of alluvial fan facies consisting of sheetflood deposits and ephemeral braided rivers. Adjacent to these are ephemeral saline playa facies recording features such as root traces, desiccation cracks, and calcareous paleosols. In situ desert varnish and minor paleosol development on alluvial facies due to inactivity are indicative of arid conditions. Stable carbon and oxygen isotopes from Dinosaur eggshells were used to estimate a mean annual temperature between 22–27.6 °C (71.6–81.7 °F), with positive isotope perturbations around the K/Pg boundary indicating periods where temperatures may have exceeded 27 °C (81 °F).

Subsequent research has reinterpreted many of the vertebrate fossils from the Nanxiong Formation as instead coming from the Hekou Formation, with the "Nanxiong Formation" instead equivalent to the Guifeng Group.

== Fossil content ==
Color key: Taxon / Reclassified taxon / Taxon falsely reported as present / Dubious taxon or junior synonym / Ichnotaxon / Ootaxon / Morphotaxon	Notes; Uncertain or tentative taxa are in small text; ~~crossed out~~ taxa are discredited.

=== Dinosaurs ===
==== Ornithischians ====
Ornithischians of the Nanxiong Formation
Genus	Species	Location	Stratigraphic position	Material	Notes	Image
Microhadrosaurus	M. nanshiungensis	Guangdong Province, China	Maastrichtian	Partial lower jaw from a juvenile that was about 2.6 m long.	A dubious hadrosaurid hadrosaur	
Nodosauridae Indet.	Indeterminate	Guangdong and Jiangxi Provinces, China	Maastrichtian	Osteoderms.	A nodosaurid ankylosaur	

==== Sauropods ====
Sauropods of the Nanxiong Formation
Genus	Species	Location	Stratigraphic position	Material	Notes	Image
Gannansaurus	G. sinensis	Jiangxi Province, China	Maastrichtian	A single, nearly complete dorsal vertebra and a mid-caudal vertebra.	A euhelopodid somphospondylian; closely related to Euhelopus zdanskyi.	
Jiangxititan	J. ganzhouensis	Jiangxi Province, China	Maastrichtian	The three posteriormost cervical vertebrae with two cervical ribs, articulated with the first four dorsal vertebrae with three dorsal ribs.	A somphospondylian sauropod	

==== Theropods ====
Theropods of the Nanxiong Formation
Genus	Species	Location	Stratigraphic position	Material	Notes	Image
Asiatyrannus	A. xui	Jiangxi Province, China	Maastrichtian	A skull, partial legs, and fragmentary caudal vertebrae.	A small-bodied tyrannosaurine tyrannosaurid; suggested by some researchers to be a possible juvenile Tarbosaurus bataar.	
Banji	B. long	Jiangxi Province, China	Maastrichtian	Nearly complete skull and lower jaw.	A oviraptorid oviraptorisaur	
Corythoraptor	C. jacobsi	Jiangxi Province, China	Maastrichtian	Nearly complete skeleton including the skull and lower jaw.	A oviraptorine oviraptorid; with a distinct cassowary-like crest.	
Ganzhousaurus	G. nankangensis	Jiangxi Province, China	Maastrichtian	Lower jaw, leg bone, hip bone and caudal vertebrae.	A heyuanniine oviraptorid	
Huanansaurus	H. ganzhouensis	Jiangxi Province, China	Campanian to Maastrichtian	Nearly complete skull, lower jaws, neck vertebrae, a humerus, arm fragments, lower part of the right thighbone, the upper part of the right shinbone, and parts of the right foot.	A oviraptorine oviraptorid	
Jiangxisaurus	J. ganzhouensis	Jiangxi Province, China	Maastrichtian	Incomplete skull, lower jaw, vertebrae, nearly complete pectoral girdle, the left forelimb, ribs, and a partially preserved pelvic girdle.	A heyuanniine oviraptorid	
Nankangia	N. jiangxiensis	Jiangxi Province, China	Maastrichtian	A partial lower jaw, vertebrae, both scapulocoracoids, a nearly complete right humerus, pubic bones, and some dorsal ribs.	A caenagnathoid oviraptorosaur	
Nanshiungosaurus	N. brevispinus	Guangdong Province, China	Maastrichtian	Eleven cervical vertebrae, ten dorsal vertebrae, six sacral vertebrae and the pelvis.	A therizinosaurid therizinosauroid	
Oviraptoridae Indet.	Indeterminate	Jiangxi Province, China	Maastrichtian	A female individual preserving a partial pelvic girdle, hindlimbs and some caudals with two eggs associated near the pelvic region.	A oviraptorid oviraptoosaur	
Oviraptoridae Indet.	Indeterminate	Guangdong Province, China	Maastrichtian	A nesting adult over a nest of eggs, preserving cervical vertebrae, arms and the pelvic region.	A oviraptorid oviraptorosaur; that represents the fifth nesting taxon.	
Oviraptoridae Indet.	Indeterminate	Jiangxi Province, China	Maastrichtian	A female individual preserving a partial pelvic girdle, hindlimbs and some caudals with two eggs associated near the pelvic region.	A oviraptorid oviraptorosaur	
Qianzhousaurus	Q. sinensis	Jiangxi Province, China	Maastrichtian	A skull, lower jaw, vertebrae, both scapulocoracoids, a left femur and a left tibia.	A alioramin tyrannosaurine; closely relate to Alioramus altai.	
Shixinggia	S. oblita	Guangdong Province, China	Maastrichtian	Sparse postcranial remains lacking the skull.	A oviraptorid oviraptorosaur; the pose indicates that it may have died trying to free itself from mud.	
Theropoda Indet.	Indeterminate	Jiangxi Province, China	Maastrichtian	A maxillary tooth that differs from tyrannosaurid and carcharodontosaurid dentition.	A notably large theropod	
Theropoda Indet.	Indeterminate	Guangdong Province, China	Maastrichtian	Isolated dorsal vertebra.	An indeterminate theropod.	
Tongtianlong	T. limosus	Jiangxi Province, China	Maastrichtian	Almost complete skeleton, portions of the arms, right leg, and tail were destroyed by TNT blasts.	A oviraptorid oviraptorosaur	
Tyrannosauridae indet.	Indeterminate	Guangdong Province, China	Maastrichtian	Two isolated teeth.	A tyrannosaurid tyrannosauroid	
Tyrannosauridae indet.	Indeterminate	Jiangxi Province, China	Maastrichtian	Large and well-preserved tooth.	A tyrannosaurid tyrannosauroid	

=== Crocodilians ===
Crocodilians of the Nanxiong Formation
Genus	Species	Location	Stratigraphic position	Material	Notes	Image
Jiangxisuchus	J. nankangensis	Jiangxi Province, China	Maastrichtian	Nearly complete skull and mandible.	A orientalosuchine alligatoroid	

=== Squamates ===
Squamates of the Nanxiong Formation
Genus	Species	Location	Stratigraphic position	Material	Notes	Image
Chianghsia	C. nankangensis	Jiangxi Province, China	Maastrichtian	A partial skull and lower jaws.	A monstersaurian lizard	
Tianyusaurus	T. zhengi	Jiangxi Province, China	Maastrichtian	A skull, mandible, first eight cervical vertebrae and nearly complete pectoral girdles.	A polyglyphanodontian lizard; also known from the Qiupa Formation.	

=== Turtles ===
Turtles of the Nanxiong Formation
Genus	Species	Location	Stratigraphic position	Material	Notes	Image
Jiangxichelys	J. ganzhouensis	Jiangxi Province, China	Maastrichtian	A complete shell.	A nanhsiungchelyid turtle	
Nanhsiungchelys	N. wuchingensis	Guangdong Province, China	Maastrichtian	A partial skeleton.	A nanhsiungchelyid turtle	

=== Ichnofossils ===
Ichnofossils of the Nanxiong Formation
Genus	Species	Location	Stratigraphic position	Material	Notes	Image
Hadrosauropodus isp.	Indeterminate	Guangdong and Jiangxi Provinces, China	Maastrichtian	Three-toed footprints.	A hadrosaur	

=== Oofossils ===
Oofossils of the Nanxiong Formation
Genus	Species	Location	Stratigraphic position	Material	Notes	Image
Elongatoolithidae indet.	Indeterminate	Jiangxi and Guangdong Provinces	Maastrichtian	Three eggs with embryonic remains.	Oviraptorid eggs	
Macroolithus	Indeterminate	Jiangxi Province, China	Maastrichtian	Five egg clutches containing over 60 eggs.	Oviraptorid eggs	
Macroolithus	Indeterminate	Guangdong Province, China	Maastrichtian	Three eggs with embryonic remains.	Oviraptorid eggs	
Macroolithus	M. yaotunensis	Jiangxi Province, China	Maastrichtian	Two eggs with embryonic remains.	Oviraptorid eggs. Skeletal proportions resemble Heyuannia huangi.	
Macroolithus	M. yaotunensis	Guangdong Province, China	Maastrichtian	A nest of 24 eggs associated with an adult oviraptorid.	Oviraptorid eggs	
Oolithes	O. elongatus	Jiangxi Province, China	Maastrichtian	Egg and egg clutches. Some of these were probably laid by Nanhsiungchelys wuchingensis.	Turtle and/or theropod eggs.	
Oolithes	O. nanhsiungensis	Jiangxi Province, China	Maastrichtian	Egg and egg clutches. Some of these were probably laid by Nanhsiungchelys wuchingensis.	Turtle and/or theropod eggs.	
Oolithes	O. rugustus	Jiangxi Province, China	Maastrichtian	Egg and egg clutches. Some of these were probably laid by Nanhsiungchelys wuchingensis.	Turtle and/or theropod eggs.	
Oolithes	O. spheroides	Jiangxi Province, China	Maastrichtian	Egg and egg clutches. Some of these were probably laid by Nanhsiungchelys wuchingensis.	Turtle and/or theropod eggs.	

== See also ==
- List of dinosaur-bearing rock formations
- Dalangshan Formation
