= Dalangshan Formation =

Geological formation in Guangdong, China

- Stratigraphic range: Maastrichtian
- Type: Geological formation
- Underlies: Shenzhuangcun Formation
- Overlies: Sanshui Formation
- Thickness: 69-517 metres

Lithology
- Primary: Sandstone, Mudstone

Location
- Coordinates: 23.1771°N 112.8392°E
- Region: Sanshui District, Guangdong Province
- Country: China
- Extent: Sanshui Basin
- Dalangshan Formation (China)

The Dalangshan Formation (simplified Chinese: 大塱山组; traditional Chinese: 大塱山組; pinyin: Dàlǎngshān Zǔ), also referred to as the Dalangshan Group is a geological formation in the Sanshui District of Guangdong Province, China, the strata of which date back to the Late Cretaceous period.

Dinosaur remains are among the fossils that have been recovered from the formation.

== Fossil content ==
Color key: Taxon / Reclassified taxon / Taxon falsely reported as present / Dubious taxon or junior synonym / Ichnotaxon / Ootaxon / Morphotaxon	Notes; Uncertain or tentative taxa are in small text; ~~crossed out~~ taxa are discredited.

=== Dinosaurs ===
==== Ornithischians ====
Ornithischians of the Dalangshan Formation
Genus	Species	Location	Stratigraphic position	Material	Notes	Image
Lambeosaurini Indet.	Indeterminate	Sanshui District, Guangdong Province, China	Maastrichtian	Partial skeleton.	A lambeosaurin lambeosaurine	

==== Theropods ====
Theropods of the Dalangshan Formation
Genus	Species	Location	Stratigraphic position	Material	Notes	Image
Heyuannia	H. huangi	Sanshui District, Guangdong Province, China	Maastrichtian	Partial skull and skeleton.	A heyuannine oviraptorid	
Tyrannosauroidea Indet.	Indeterminate	Sanshui District, Guangdong Province, China	Maastrichtian	Dental remains.	A large tyrannosauroid theropod	

== See also ==
- List of dinosaur-bearing rock formations
- Nanxiong Formation
