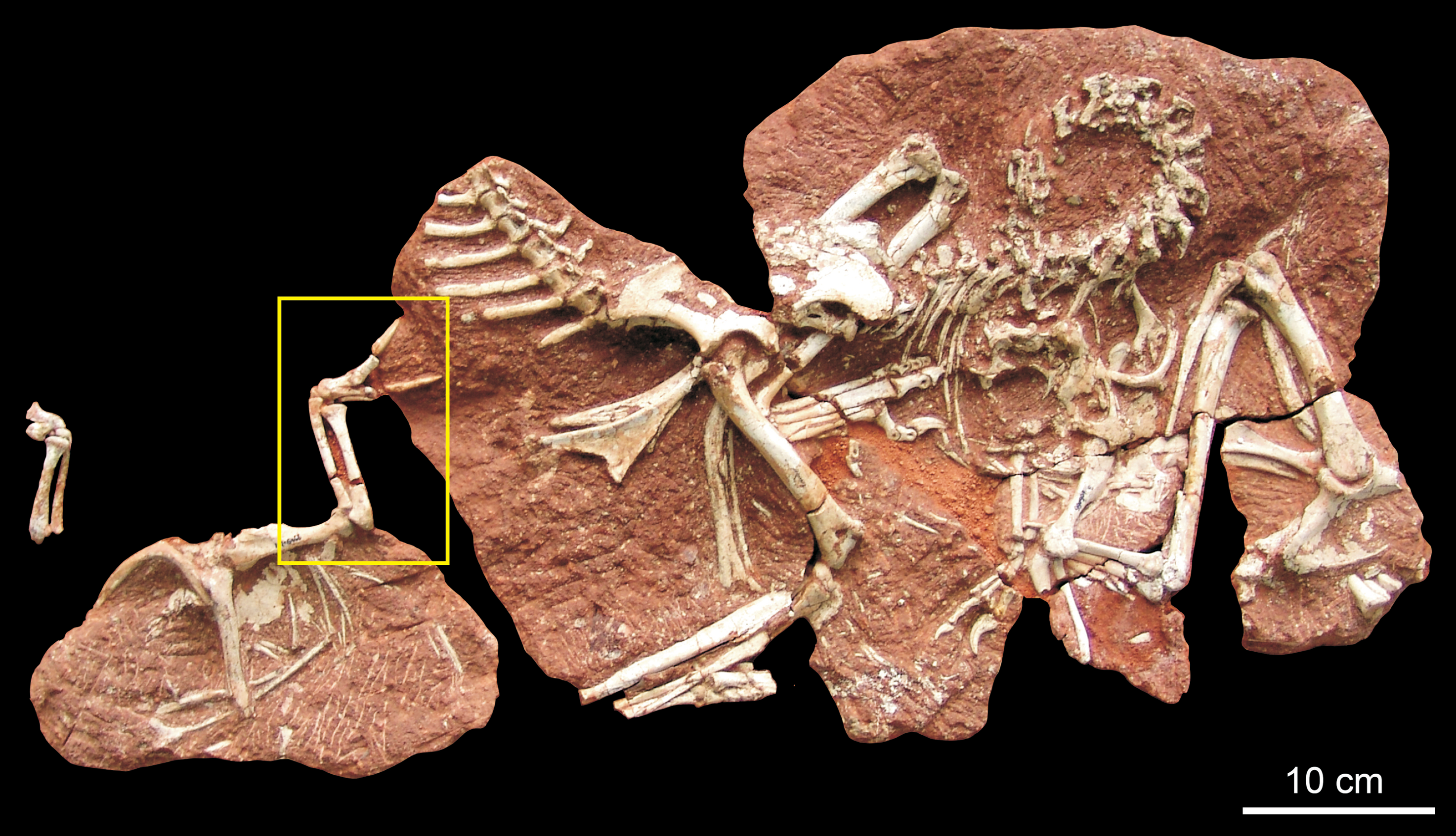
- Holotype block of H. huangi

Scientific classification
- Kingdom: Animalia
- Phylum: Chordata
- Class: Reptilia
- Clade: Dinosauria
- Clade: Saurischia
- Clade: Theropoda
- Family: †Oviraptoridae
- Subfamily: †Heyuanninae
- Genus: †Heyuannia; Lü, 2002

Type species
- Heyuannia huangi Lü, 2002

Other species
- Heyuannia yanshini (Barsbold, 1981)

Synonyms
- Ingenia yanshini Barsbold, 1981 (preoccupied); Ajancingenia yanshini Easter, 2013

= Heyuannia =

Heyuannia Temporal range: Late Cretaceous, 70–66 Ma

Extinct genus of dinosaurs

Heyuannia ("from Heyuan") is a genus of oviraptorid dinosaur that lived in Asia during the Late Cretaceous epoch, in what is now China and Mongolia. It was the first oviraptorid found in China; most others were found in neighbouring Mongolia. Two species are known: H. huangi, named by Lü Junchang in 2002 from the Dalangshan Formation; and H. yanshini, originally named as a separate genus Ingenia from the Barun Goyot Formation by Rinchen Barsbold in 1981, and later renamed to Ajancingenia in 2013 due to the preoccupation of Ingenia. The latter name was eventually discarded due to various ethical issues surrounding the author.

== Discovery and naming ==
=== H. huangi ===
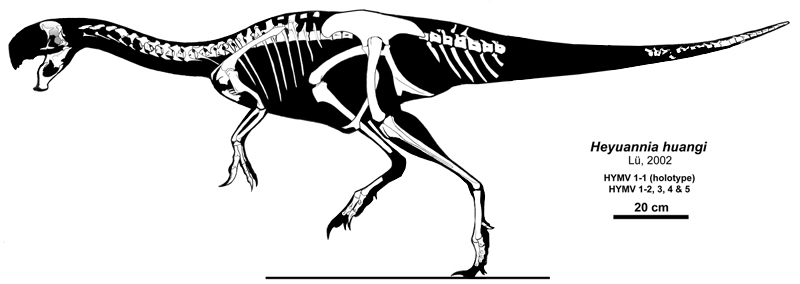
Skeletal reconstruction of H. huangi

The type species, Heyuannia huangi, was named and described by Lü Junchang in 2002. The generic name refers to the city of Heyuan. The specific name honours Huang Dong, the director of the Heyuan Museum. The holotype, HYMV1-1, was discovered in Guangdong near Huangsha in layers of the Dalangshan Formation. It consists of a partial skeleton, including the skull. Six further skeletons were assigned as paratypes or referred to the species. Multiple other fossils have been found, including one which may retain possible reproductive organs. Thousands of eggs have also been uncovered at the site, some of them belonging to the genus and likely laid by Heyuannia.

=== H. yanshini ===
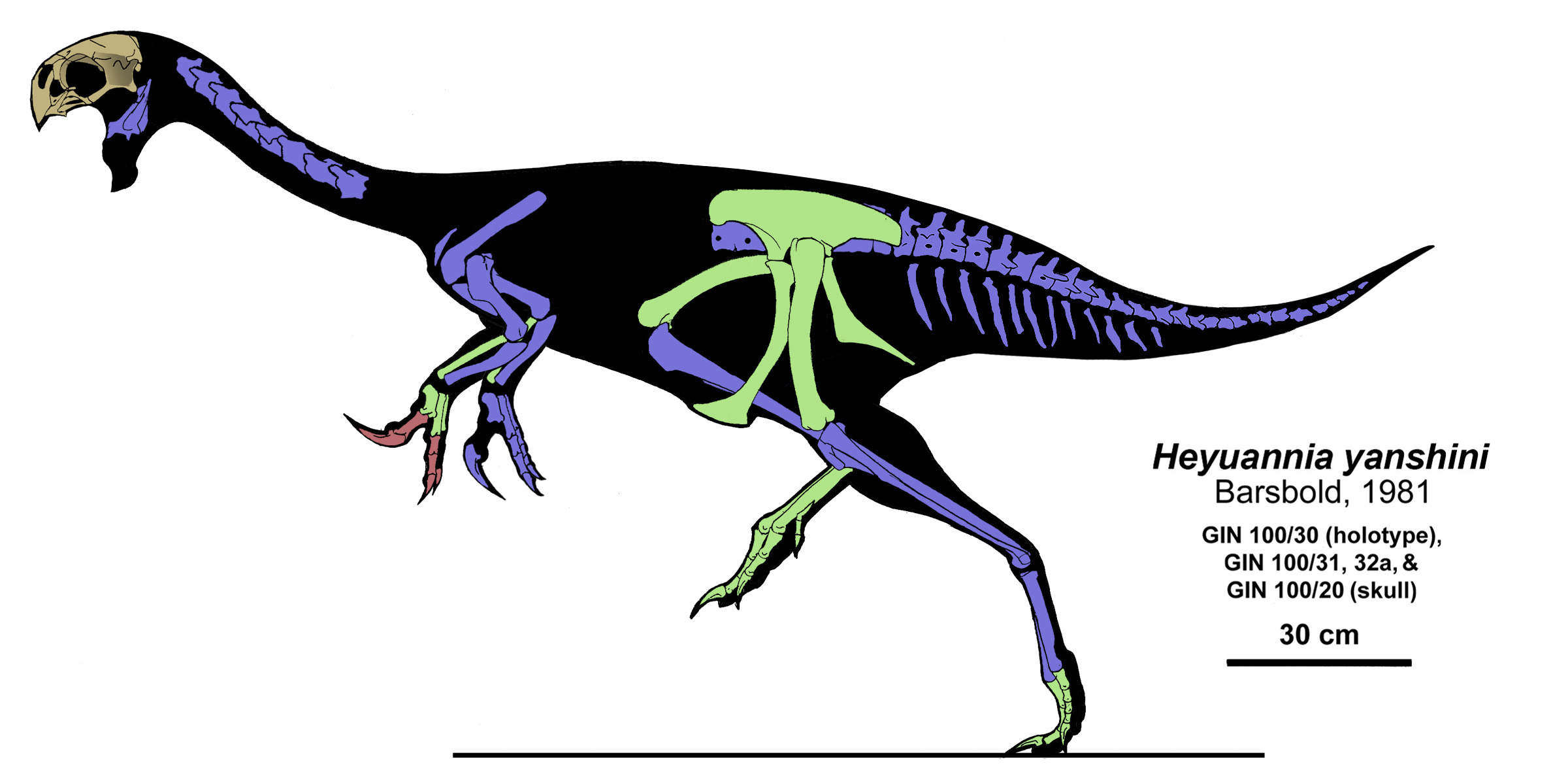
Skeletal reconstruction of H. yanshini. Known elements in blue, red, and green

H. yanshini was first described and named by Rinchen Barsbold in 1981, as a new genus and species Ingenia yanshini. The name "Ingenia" derives from the Ingen Khoboor Depression of Bayankhongor Province (Barun Goyot Formation), Mongolia, from whence it was collected, while the specific name yanshini was chosen in honour of academician Aleksandr Leonidovich Yanshin (1911–1999), who was adviser and mentor to Rinchen Barsbold during his time at the Paleontological Institute in St. Petersburg, Russia. Most of the material known for this is species actually a composite of four specimens, including the holotype skull of Conchoraptor.

The generic name Ingenia was preoccupied by the generic name of Ingenia mirabilis (Gerlach, 1957), a tripyloidid nematode. Thus, an alternative generic name, Ajancingenia, was proposed by Jesse Easter in 2013. The replacement generic name is derived also from ajanc (аянч; a traveler in Mongolian), as a Western allusion to sticking one's thumb out for hitchhiking, in reference to the first manual ungual of Ajancingenia which is twice as large as the second. In 2018, Gregory Funston and colleagues noted that Easter's redescription had "several ethical problems", including plaigiarized text. Although this is not enough reason to invalidate Ajancingenia, they reclassified it as a species of Heyuannia, creating the new combination Heyuannia yanshini, in order to avoid an ethical dilemma. This assignment has since been accepted by other authors.

== Description ==
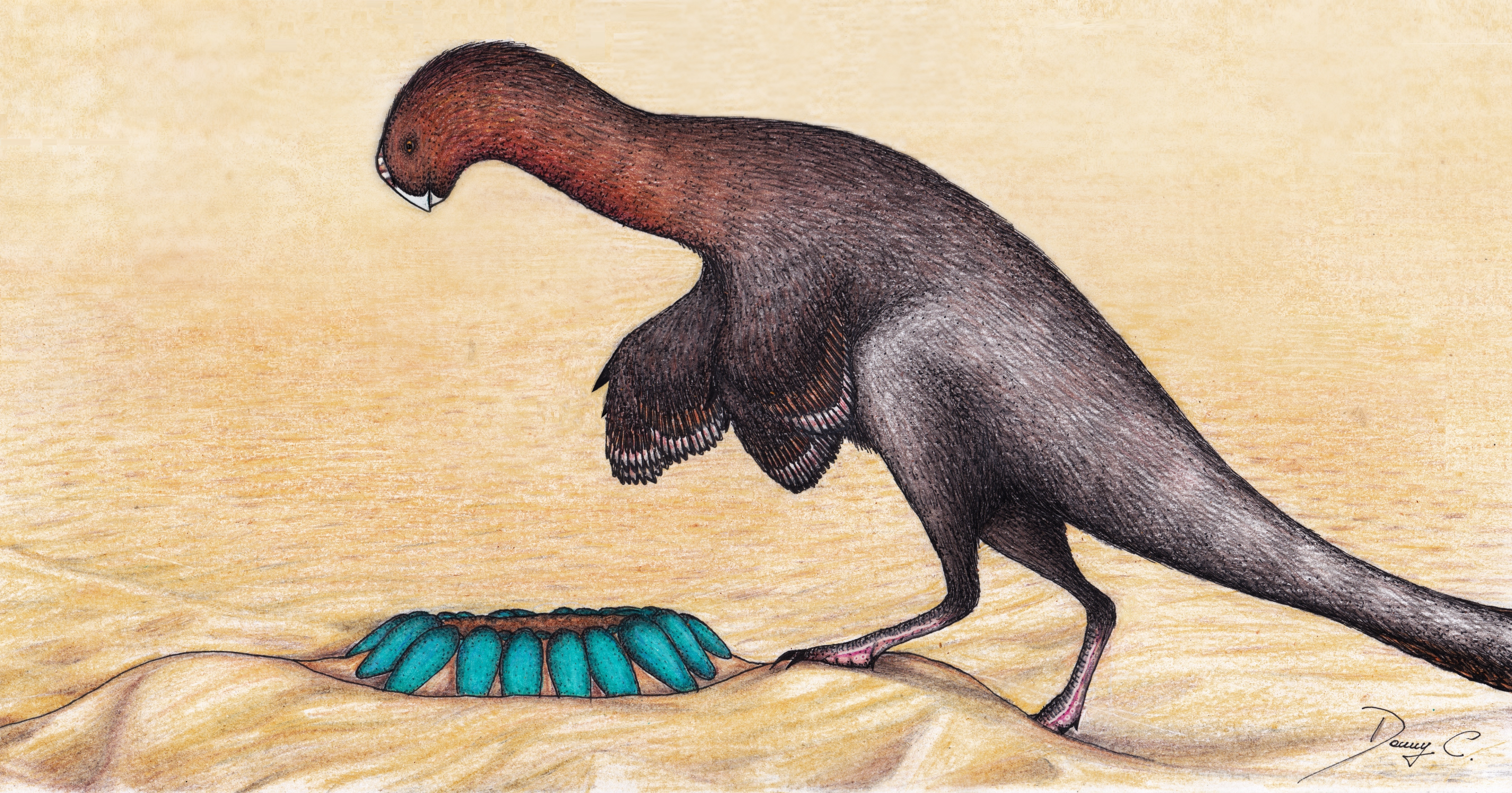
Life restoration of Heyuannia by its nest, showing the blue-green coloration of the eggs

Heyuannia is a medium-sized oviraptorid. Gregory S. Paul in 2010 estimated its length at 1.5 metres, the weight at twenty kilograms. Its toothless skull is relatively short with a steep snout. It had very short arms and digits, and its first digit was reduced.

== Classification ==
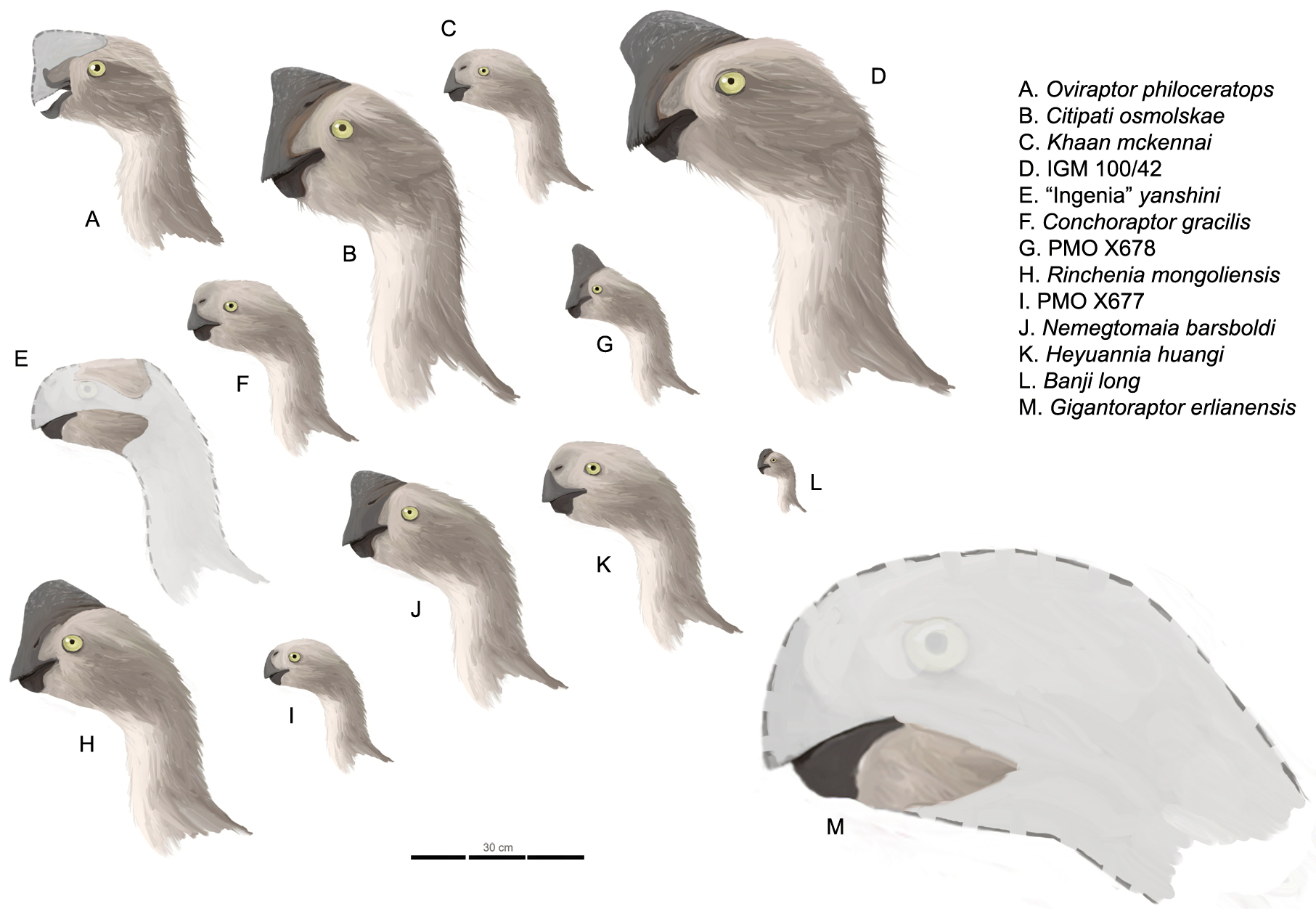
Restorations of oviraptorid heads shown to scale; E is H. yanshini and K is H. huangi

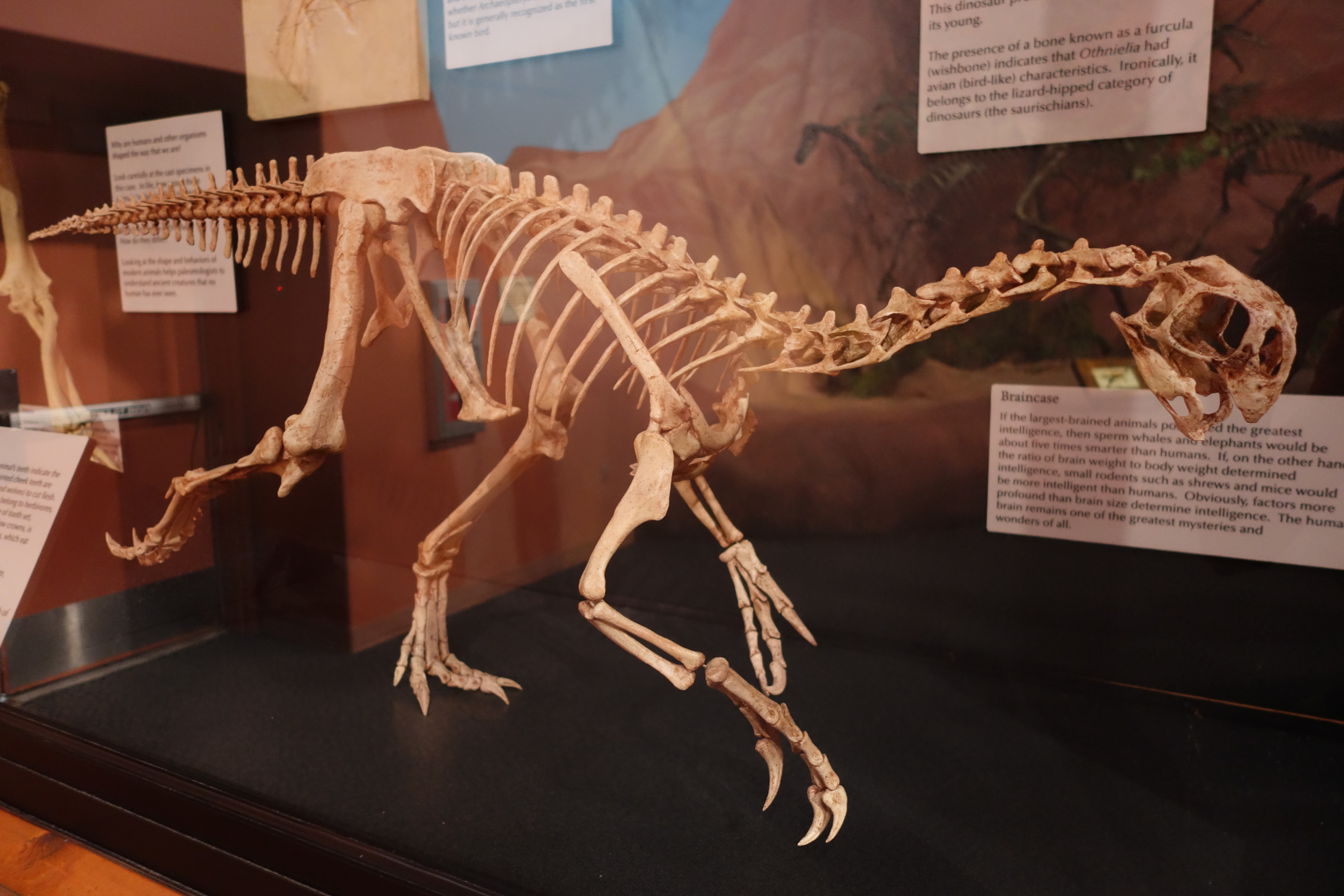
Reconstructed skeleton of H. yanshini with inaccurate hand posture

Heyuannia was assigned by Lü to the Oviraptoridae in 2002. Its exact placement within this group is uncertain. Later analyses either resulted in a position in the Oviraptorinae or the Ingeniinae. According to Lü the morphology of the shoulder girdle of Heyuannia supports the hypothesis that oviraptorosaurians were secondarily flightless birds.

The following cladogram follows the 2017 phylogenetic analysis by Funston and colleagues:

- Oviraptoridae
  - Nankangia jiangxiensis
  - - Ganzhousaurus nankangensis
    - - - Nomingia gobiensis
        - Yulong mini
      - - Oviraptor philoceratops
        - - - Rinchenia mongoliensis
            - - Citipati osmolskae
              - Citipati sp.
          - - - Banji long
              - Wulatelong gobiensis
            - - Shixinggia oblita
              - - Khaan mckennai
                - - Conchoraptor gracilis
                  - - Machairasaurus leptonychus
                    - - Jiangxisaurus ganzhouensis
                      - - Nemegtomaia barsboldi
                        - - Heyuannia huangi
                          - Heyuannia yanshini

== Paleobiology ==
=== Reproduction ===
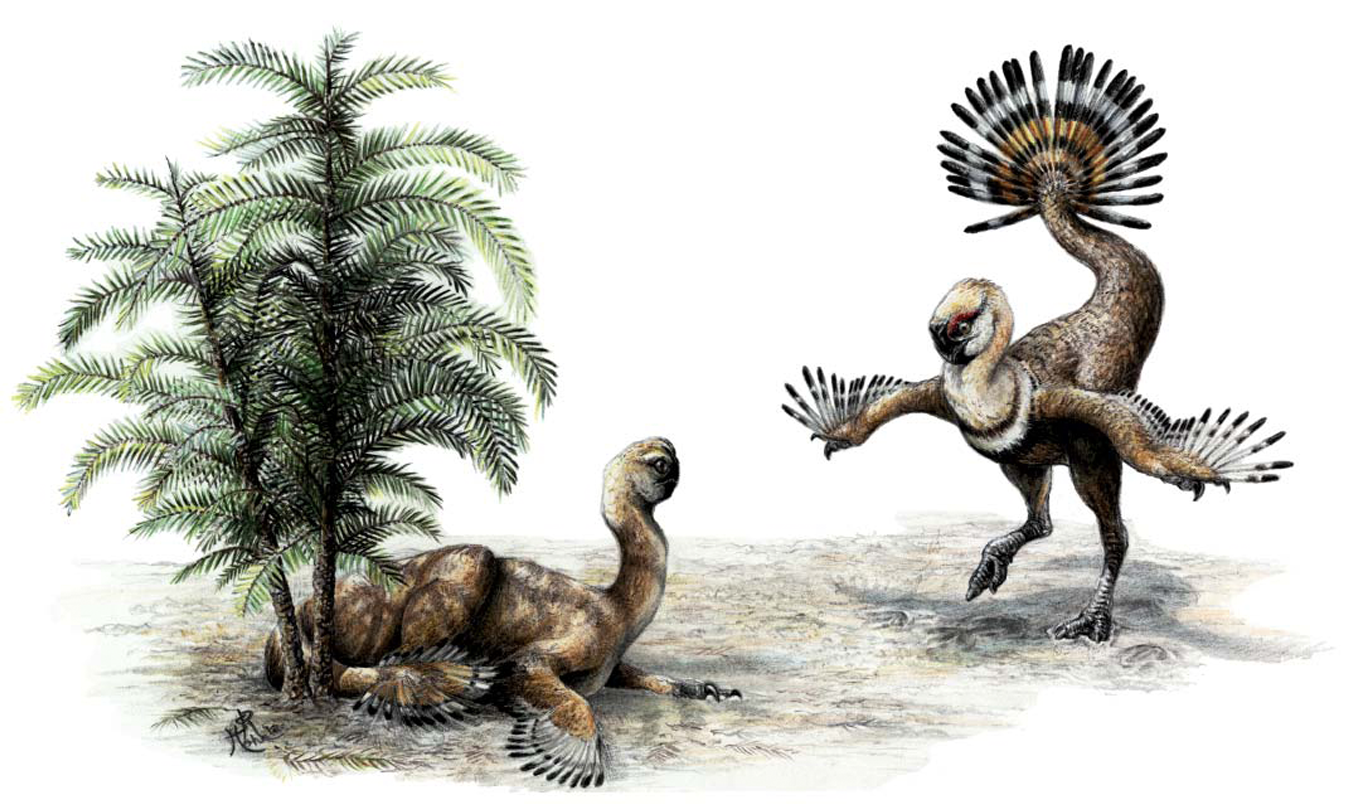
Life restoration of a H. yanshini displaying for a female

Preservation of the pigments biliverdin and protoporphyrin in eggshells belonging to Heyuannia (parataxonomically classified as Macroolithus) indicate that they were blue-green in color. This coloration allowed for both camouflage and sexual signalling, also seen in American robins and ratites. The arrangement of the eggshells suggests a partially open nest arrangement for Heyuannia, and also indicates that it engaged in increased parental care.

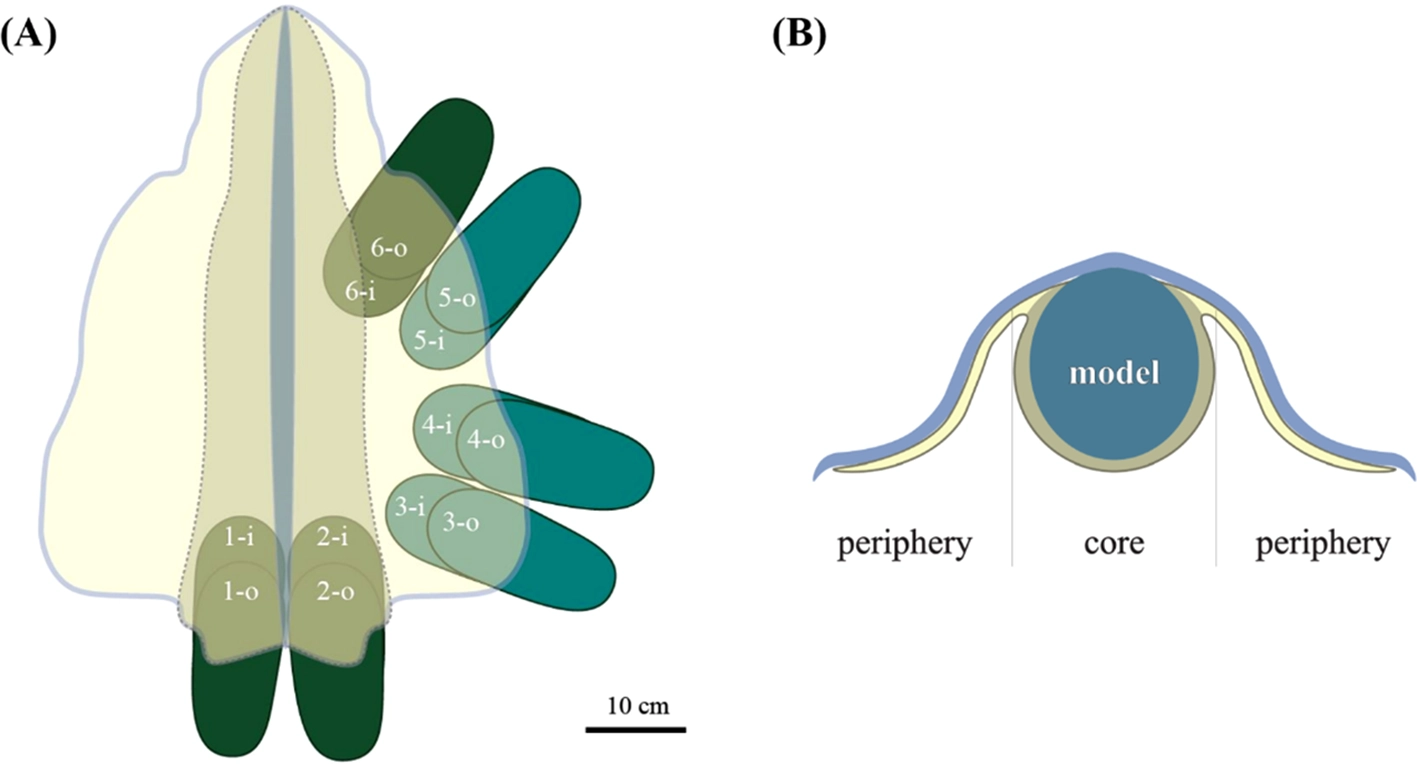
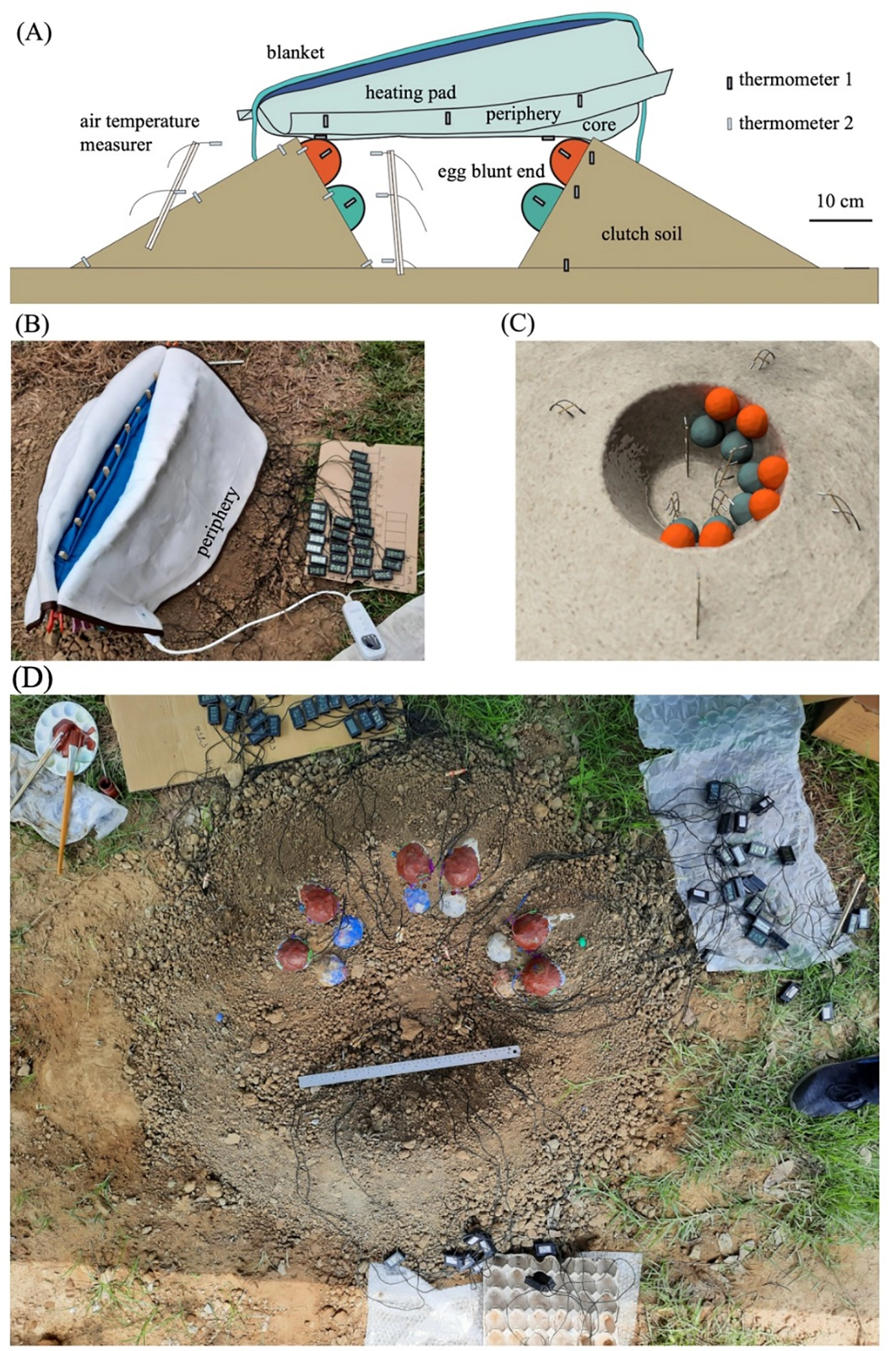
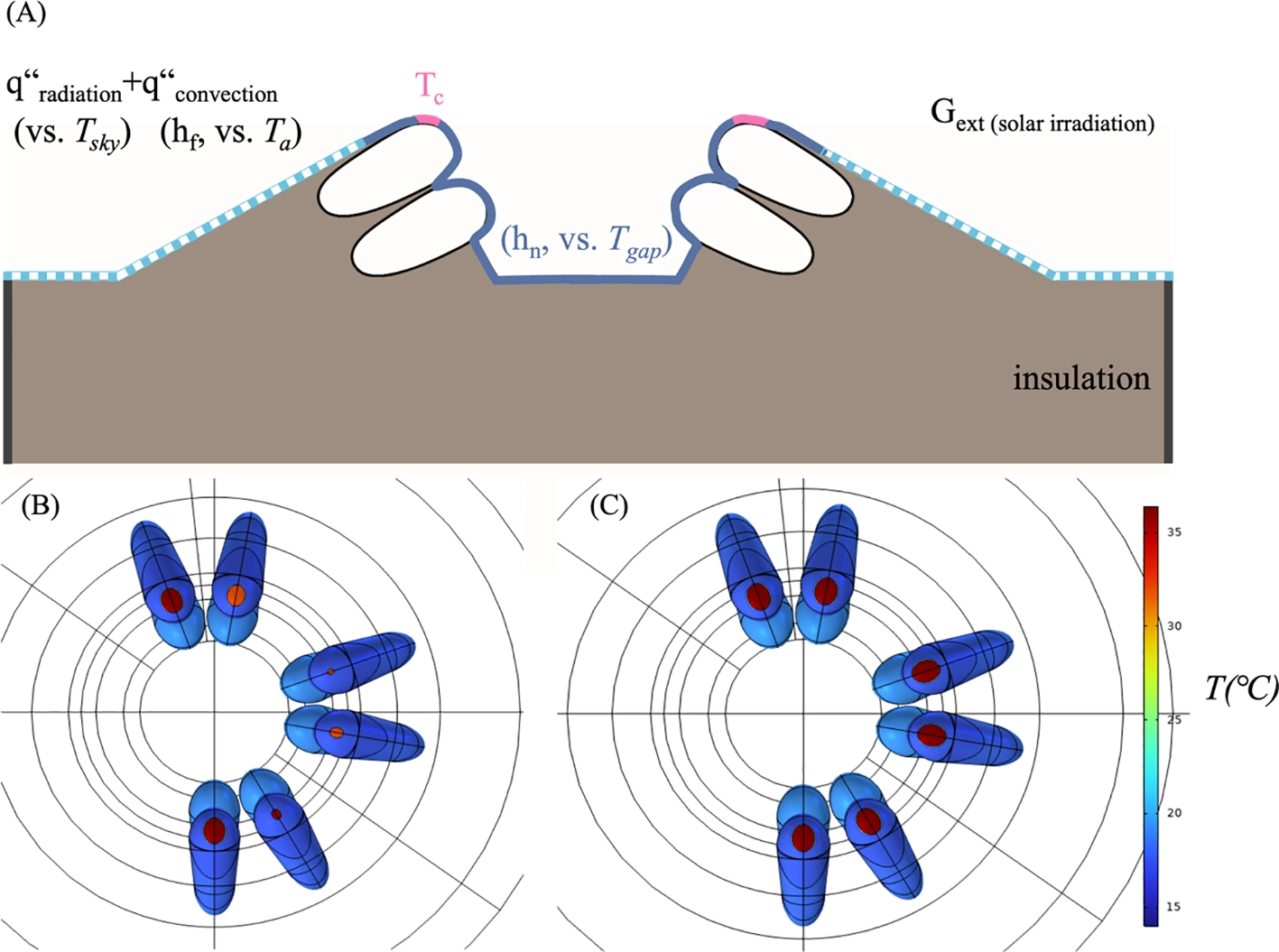
Design and simulations of an incubation experiment to test the brooding behaviour of oviraptorids, based on the proportions of Heyuannia and Nemegtomaia

The palaeontologist Chun-Yu Su and colleagues devised an experiment to evaluate whether oviraptorids employed thermoregulatory contact incubation to provide heat for embryonic development in 2026. They designed an incubator, clutch, and numerical simulations of heat transfer to test the brooding behaviour of the related oviraptorids Heyuannia and Nemegtomaia, based on their body proportions. The results showed that the incubator only partially covered the eggs in the outer ring of the clutch, which led to a difference in temperature between the inner and outer eggs, and therefore lower incubation efficiency than in modern birds.

These researchers concluded that their experiment did not support thermoregulatory contact incubation in oviraptorids, instead suggesting they co-regulated their incubation with environmental heat (in conjunction with solar input), where the adult stabilised temperatures of the clutch, reduced thermal extremes, and influenced the pattern of asynchronous hatching, where a clutch hatches over several days instead of at once. The large difference between incubation temperatures in the two oviraptorids suggests they did not have temperature-dependent sex determination (which is used by for example crocodiles), as the sex-ratios would be skewed.

== See also ==
- Timeline of oviraptorosaur research
