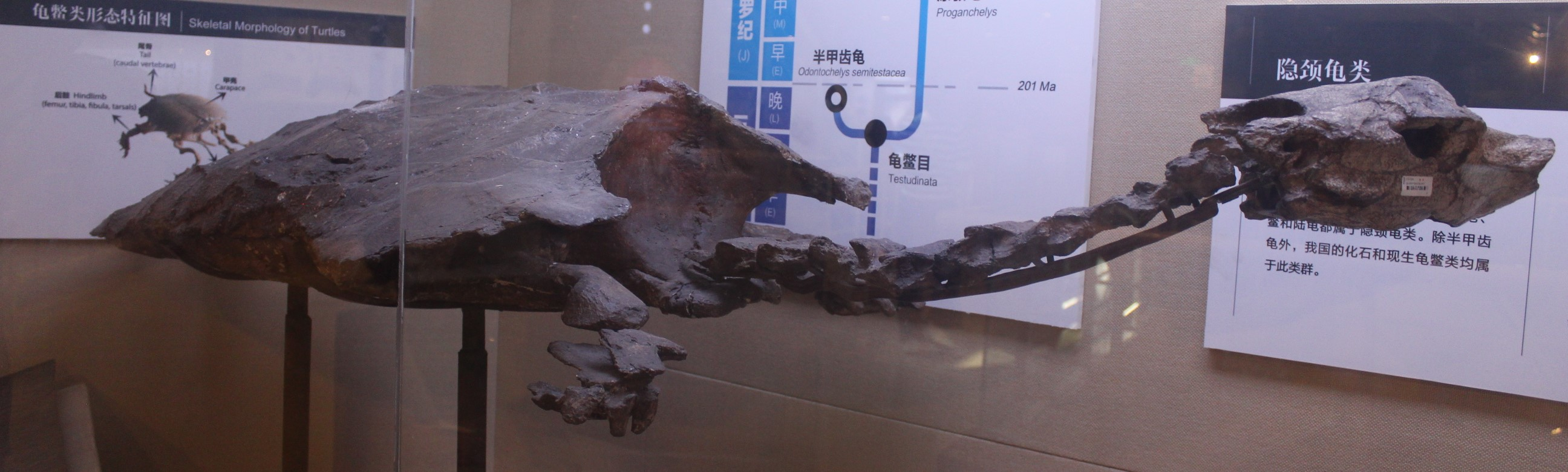
- Holotype skeleton (IVPP V3106) of N. wuchingensis, Paleozoological Museum of China

Scientific classification
- Kingdom: Animalia
- Phylum: Chordata
- Class: Reptilia
- Order: Testudines
- Suborder: Cryptodira
- Family: †Nanhsiungchelyidae
- Genus: †Nanhsiungchelys; Ye, 1966

Type species
- †Nanhsiungchelys wuchingensis Ye, 1966

Other species
- †N. yangi Yang et al, 2023

= Nanhsiungchelys =

Nanhsiungchelys Temporal range: Maastrichtian 70.6–66.043 Ma

Extinct genus of turtles

Nanhsiungchelys is a trionychoid turtle from the Upper Cretaceous of Nanhsiung, China. Its genus is derived from the location where it was found, Nanhsiung and the greek word "χελωνα" (chelona), which means turtle. Therefore, Nanhsiungchelys means "turtle from Nanxiong". Nanhsiungchelys has been found in rocks dating to the Maastrichtian of Asia and North America. A second species, N. yangi, was described in 2023 on the basis of a skull, mandible, and anterior portion of the carapace that had been found in the Nanxiong Basin, China.
