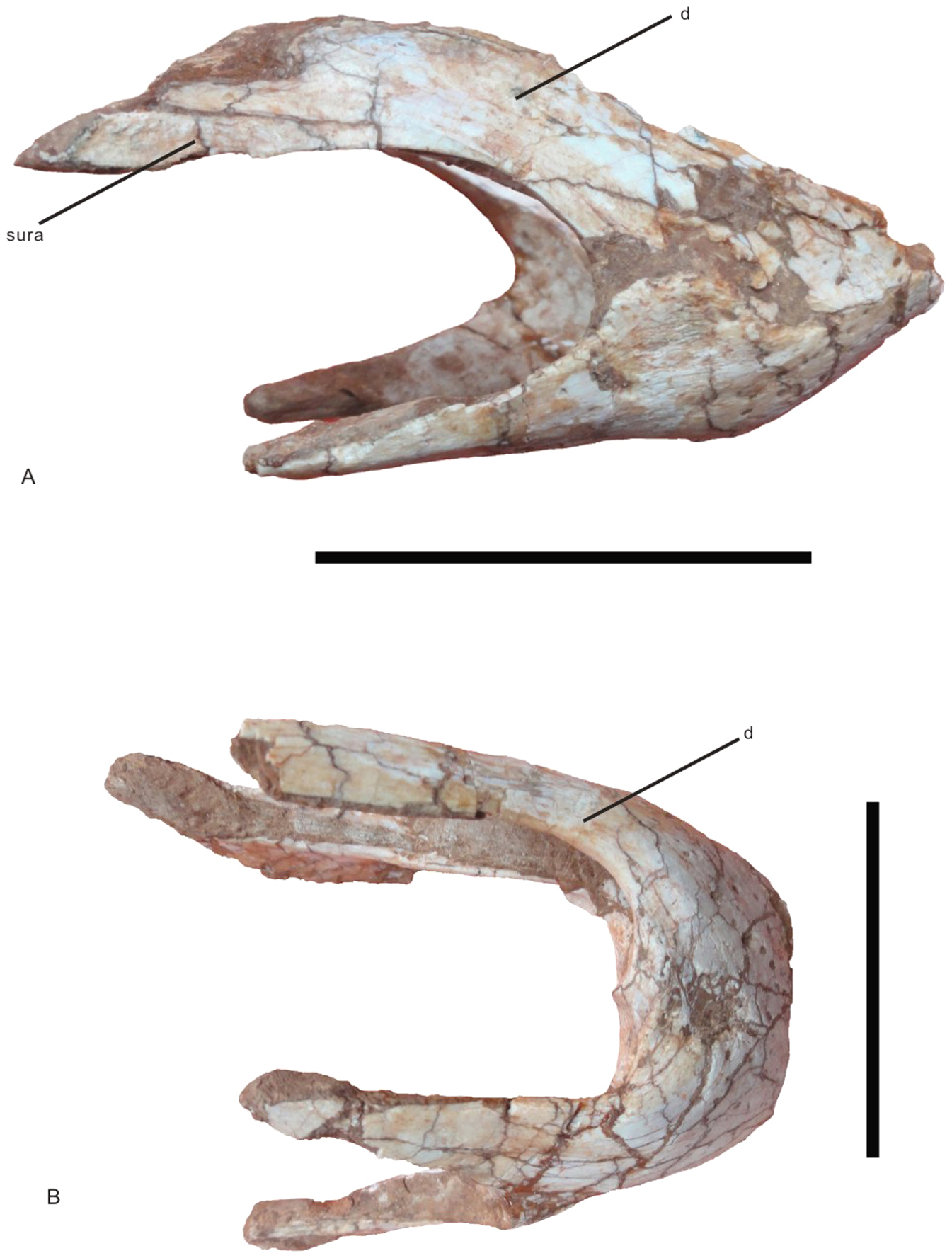
- Lower jaw

Scientific classification
- Kingdom: Animalia
- Phylum: Chordata
- Class: Reptilia
- Clade: Dinosauria
- Clade: Saurischia
- Clade: Theropoda
- Superfamily: †Caenagnathoidea
- Genus: †Nankangia; Lü et al., 2013

Type species
- †Nankangia jiangxiensis Lü et al., 2013

= Nankangia =

Nankangia Temporal range: Late Cretaceous, 72–66 Ma

Extinct genus of dinosaurs

Nankangia is an extinct genus of caenagnathoid oviraptorosaurian dinosaur known from the Upper Cretaceous Nanxiong Formation of Nankang County, Ganzhou City of Jiangxi Province, southeastern China. It contains a single species, Nankangia jiangxiensis. N. jiangxiensis coexisted with at least four other caenagnathoids, including but not limited to Corythoraptor, Banji, Ganzhousaurus and Jiangxisaurus. The relatively short dentary and non-downturned mandibular symphysis of Nankangia suggest that it may have been more herbivorous than carnivorous. Its diet consisted of leaves and seeds.

== Discovery ==
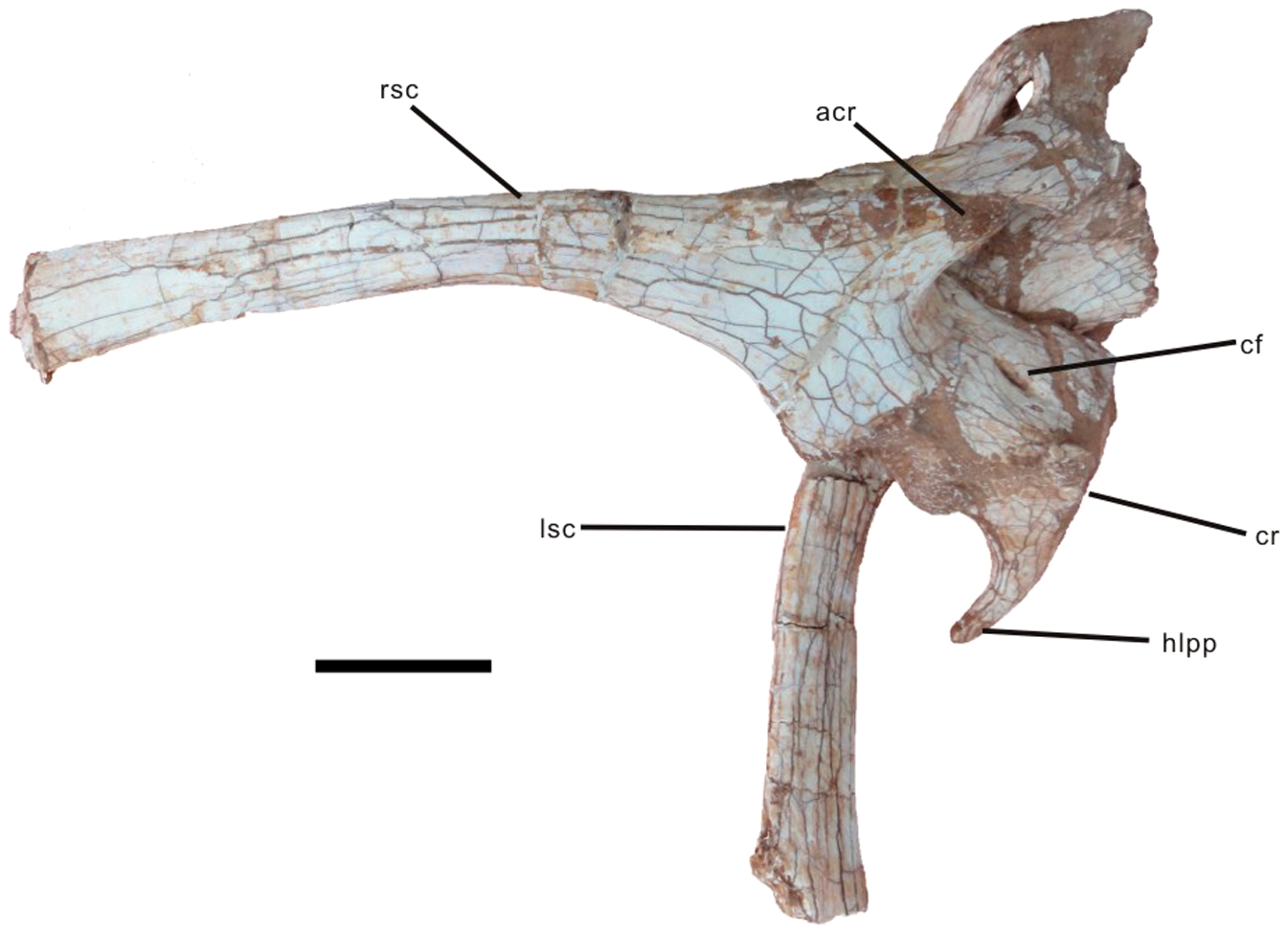
Scapulocoracoids

Nankangia was first described and named by Lü Junchang, Yi Laiping, Zhong Hui and Wei Xuefang in 2013 and the type species is Nankangia jiangxiensis. The generic name honors the Chinese administrative unit Nankang County in Jiangxi Province, and the specific name honors the province where the holotype site in Nankang City is located.

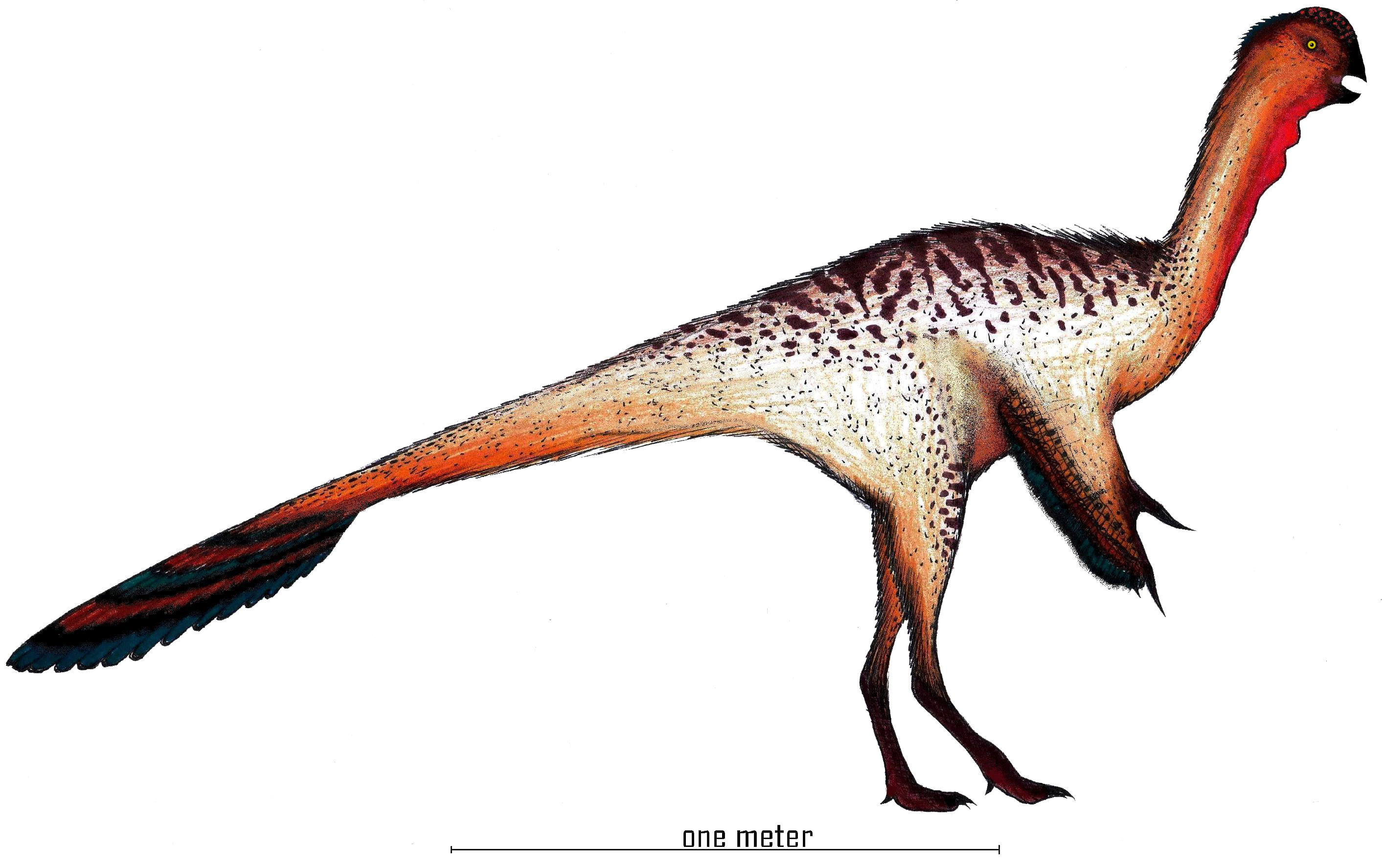
Restoration

Nankangia is known solely from the holotype GMNH F10003, a partial lower jaw and partial postcranial skeleton from a single individual, housed at the Ganzhou Museum of Natural History, Ganzhou City of Jiangxi Province. Postcranial material includes five complete dorsal vertebrae, one and one-half sacral vertebrae, nine complete and two partial caudal vertebrae, both scapulocoracoids, an incomplete furcula, a nearly complete right humerus, the complete right and most of the left ilia, the complete right and most of the left pubic bones, the complete right and a partial left ischia, both femora, the right tibia, and some dorsal ribs.

The holotype was found in 2010 at the town of Longling of Nankang, Ganzhou City, by a local farmer who donated it to the Ganzhou Museum of Natural History. It was collected from the Nanxiong Formation, dating probably to the Maastrichtian stage of the Late Cretaceous.

== Description ==
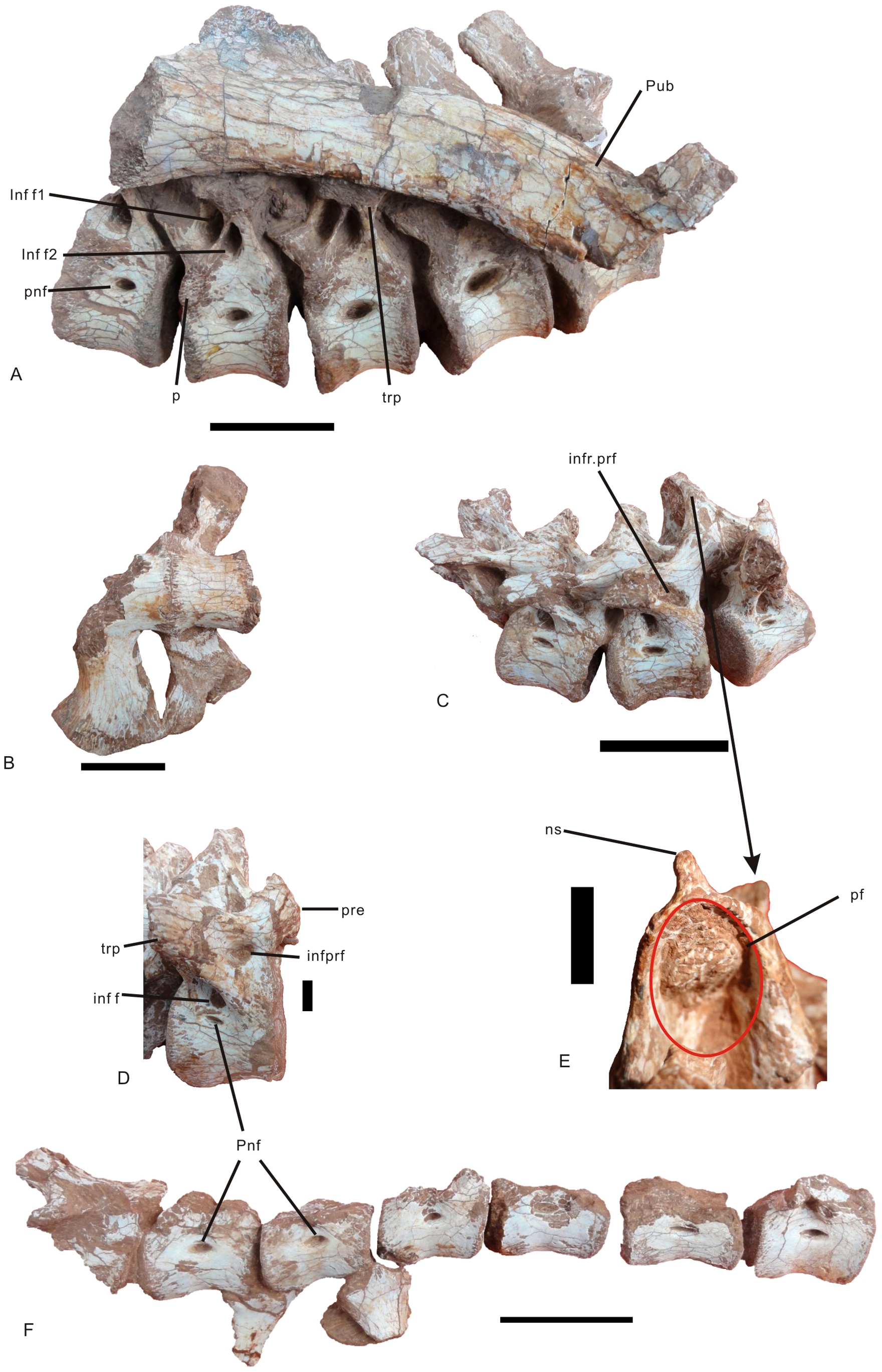
Vertebral column

Nankangia is distinguished from all other oviraptorosaurians based on a combination of traits, some of which are autapomorphic (i.e. unique). On the ventral surface near the base of the transverse process of the dorsal vertebrae two infradiapophyseal fossae are present. The sacral vertebrae bear slit-like pneumatic fossae. The neural spines of the anterior caudal vertebrae are wider transversely than anteroposteriorly, forming a large posterior fossa with a rugose central area. These vertebrae possess a large fossa on the anterior surface of the base of the transverse process (infraprezygapophyseal fossa) and as well as an infradiapophyseal fossa on the ventral surface of the transverse process.

The femur and tibia of Nankangia are approximately the same length. Its femoral neck extends dorsomedially at about 90° to the shaft. It has relatively small ratio of height to length of ilium (0.36), which is additionally shorter than the femur as seen in Yulong and Khaan. The ilium of Nankangia is uniquely shaped, and among oviraptorosaurians, resembles the ilia of Chirostenotes, Rinchenia, Heyuannia and Shixinggia, and clearly differs from the ilium of Luoyanggia. Due to the lack of well-preserved corresponding elements between the specimens of Nankangia and Wulatelong, from the Wulansuhai Formation of Inner Mongolia, Lü et al. (2013) could not differentiated between them.

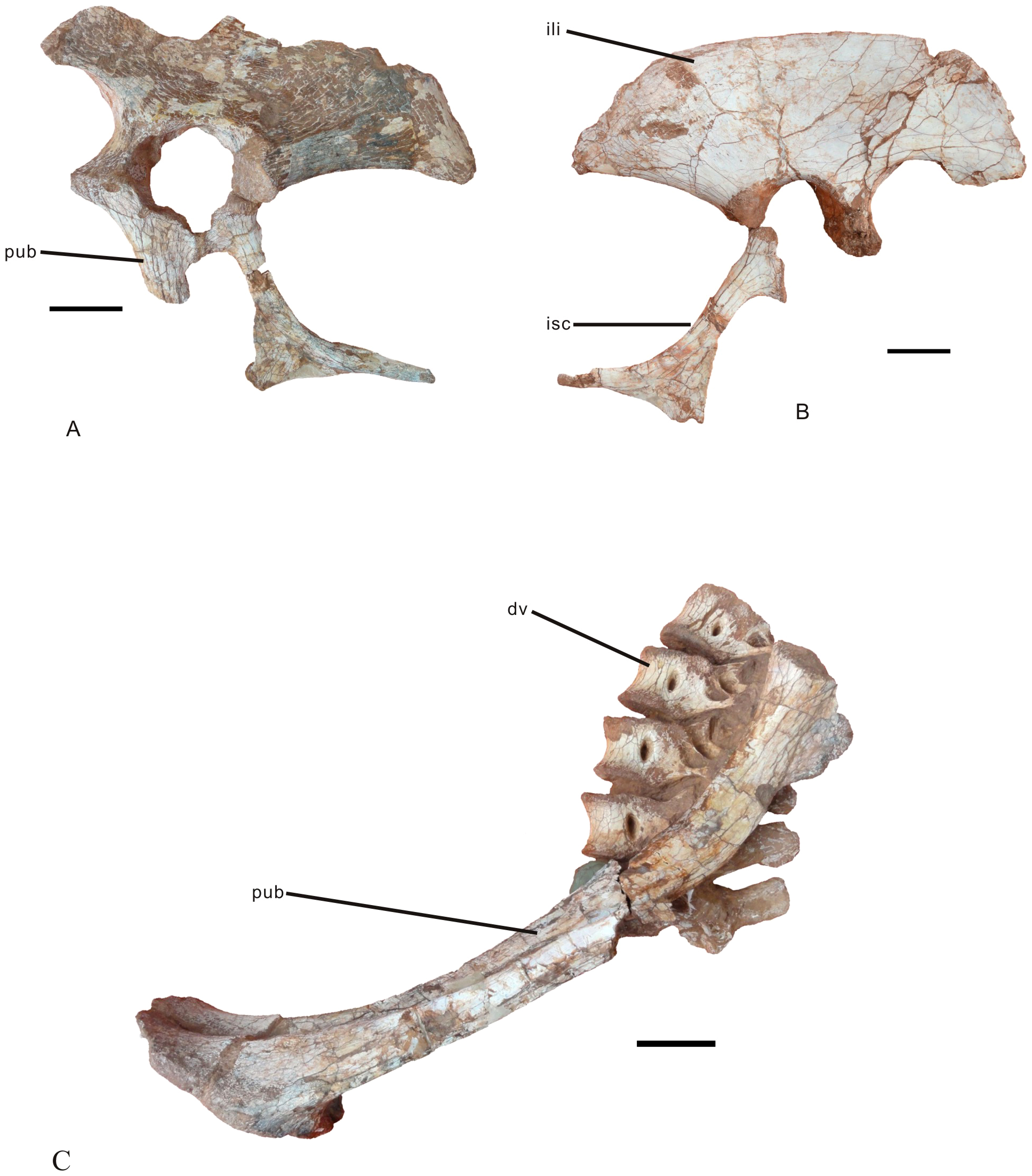
Pelvic girdle

The rostral end of the mandibular symphyseal region is not downturned in Nankangia, as in caenagnathids, Incisivosaurus, Luoyanggia and Ganzhousaurus. Unlike the V-shaped mandibular symphysis of Luoyanggia, Nankangia and other oviraptorosaurs have a U-shaped mandibular symphysis. Although Nankangia and Jiangxisaurus possess similar lower jaws, the medial margin of the humerus is more curved medially in Nankangia than it is in Jiangxisaurus. Based on its phylogenetic position, Nankangia displays five other possible autapomorphies, including an anteriorly projecting acromion, separated anterior and greater trochanters, dorsoventral extension of the pubic peduncle that is deeper than the ischial peduncle, and the lack of a downturned symphyseal portion of the dentary. The latter trait is shared with the coeval Ganzhousaurus and Jiangxisaurus, suggesting a primarily herbivorous diet, whereas Banji and another unnamed oviraptorid from the same formation may have been more carnivorous, as they bear a downturned mandibular symphysis.

== Phylogeny ==
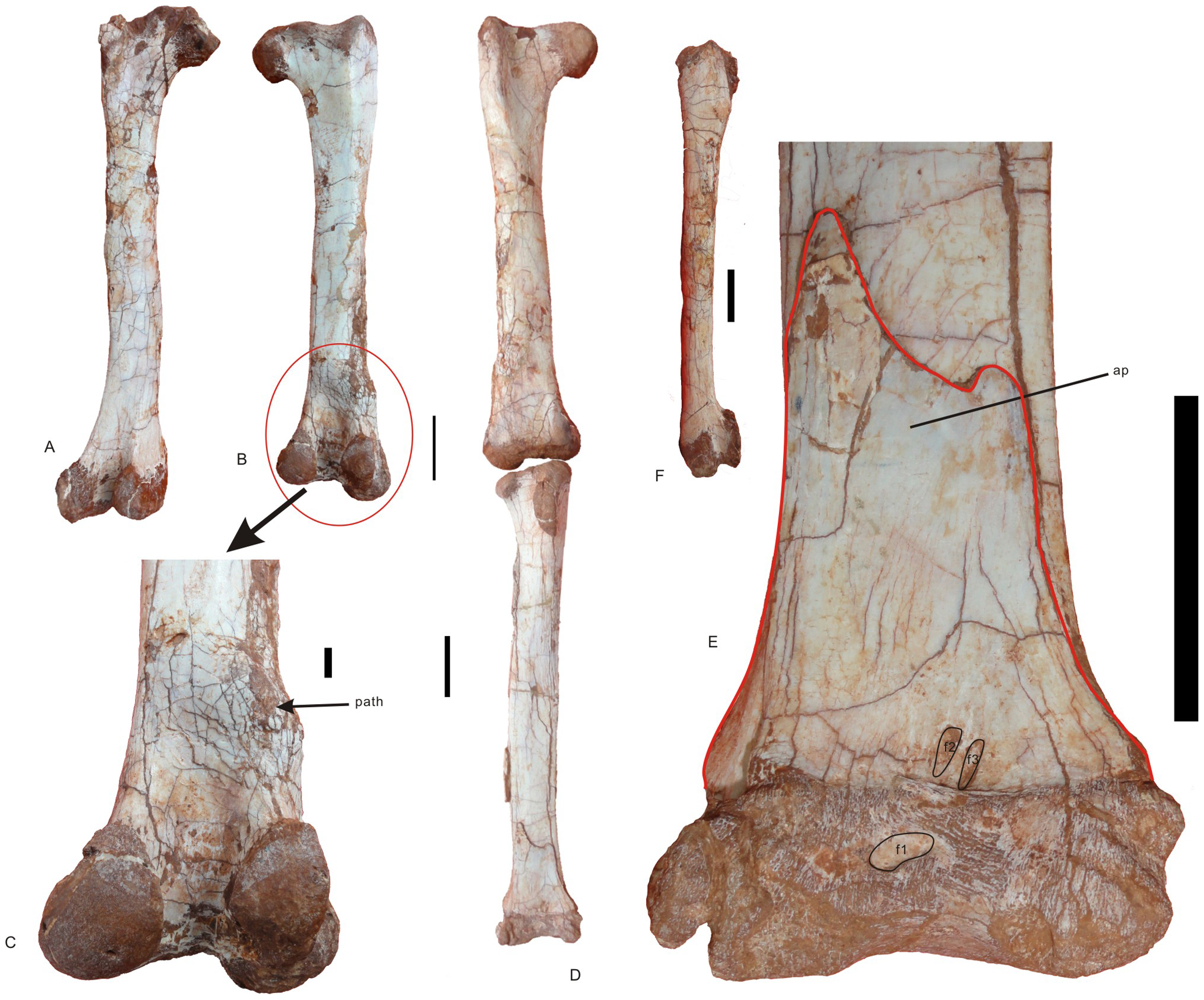
leg bones

The phylogenetic position of Nankangia was explored by Lü et al. (2013) using the data matrix published with the description of Yulong. The obtained topology was resolved, with the exception of a polytomy between the "Ingeniinae", Oviraptor, and the rest of the Oviraptorinae. Lü et al. (2013) suggested that Nankangia may form a clade with Gigantoraptor and Chirostenotes, and therefore refrained from including the former two taxa in the Oviraptoridae, even though this was not supported by their phylogenetic analysis. However, Oviraptoridae is currently defined as a stem-based taxon that excludes caenagnathids but includes Oviraptor, and an alternative definition was not suggested by Lü et al. (2013). The cladogram below shows the phylogenetic position of Nankangia following this analysis, as the sister taxon to the clade mislabeled as Oviraptoridae.

- Oviraptorosauria
  - Incisivosaurus
  - - Caudipteryx
    - - Avimimus
      - - Chirostenotes
        - - Gigantoraptor
          - - Nankangia
            - Oviraptoridae
              - Yulong
              - - Oviraptor
                - - Rinchenia
                  - - Citipati
                    - Citipati sp.
                - "Ingeniinae"
                  - Khaan
                  - - Conchoraptor
                    - - Machairasaurus
                      - - Ajancingenia
                        - - Heyuannia
                          - Nemegtomaia

The phylogenetic analysis of Lü et al. (2017) recovered it as an oviraptorid closely related to Yulong and Nomingia and the phylogenetic analysis of Wei et al. (2022) found it to be the most basal oviraptorid.

== See also ==
- Timeline of oviraptorosaur research
