= Jiangxichelys =

Jiangxichelys Temporal range: Late Cretaceous, 66.7 Ma

Scientific classification
- Domain: Eukaryota
- Kingdom: Animalia
- Phylum: Chordata
- Class: Reptilia
- Order: Testudines
- Suborder: Cryptodira
- Family: †Nanhsiungchelyidae
- Genus: †Jiangxichelys; Tong & Mo, 2010

Type species
- †Jianxichelys ganzhouensis Tong & Mo, 2010

Extinct genus of turtles

Jiangxichelys is an extinct genus of nanhsiungchelyid turtle which existed in Ganzhou, Jiangxi Province, China during the latest Cretaceous epoch. It was first named by Haiyan Tong and Jinyou Mo in 2010 and the type species is Jiangxichelys ganzhouensis. It was probably terrestrial, like other members of its family.
