= Asiatyrannus =

Asiatyrannus Temporal range: Late Cretaceous (Maastrichtian), ~66.7 Ma
- Holotype skull, tibia, and metatarsals, National Natural History Museum of China

Scientific classification
- Kingdom: Animalia
- Phylum: Chordata
- Class: Reptilia
- Clade: Dinosauria
- Clade: Saurischia
- Clade: Theropoda
- Superfamily: †Tyrannosauroidea
- Family: †Tyrannosauridae
- Subfamily: †Tyrannosaurinae
- Genus: †Asiatyrannus; Zheng et al., 2024
- Species: †A. xui

Binomial name
- †Asiatyrannus xui Zheng et al., 2024

Genus of tyrannosaurid dinosaur

Asiatyrannus (meaning "Asian tyrant") is an extinct genus of tyrannosaurine theropod dinosaurs from the Late Cretaceous Nanxiong Formation of China. The genus contains a single species, Asiatyrannus xui, known from a single specimen consisting of a skull and partial skeleton. Asiatyrannus is notable for its deep-snouted skull and small body size, in contrast to the gracile snout and larger size of the contemporary Qianzhousaurus. It represents the southernmost record of an Asian tyrannosaurid. Some researchers have questioned the validity of Asiatyrannus, suggesting that its small size is due to its immaturity and that this specimen may represent a young individual of the better-known Tarbosaurus.

== Discovery and naming ==
The Asiatyrannus holotype specimen, ZMNH M30360, was discovered in September 2017 in sediments of the Nanxiong Formation near Shahe Town in Nankang District of Ganzhou City, Jiangxi Province, China. The specimen consists of most of an articulated skull in addition to disarticulated parts of the postcrania, comprising much of the right and left legs and several caudal vertebrae.

In 2024, Zheng et al. described Asiatyrannus xui as a new genus and species of tyrannosaurid based on these fossil remains. The generic name, Asiatyrannus, combines "Asia", the continent of origin, with the Latinised Greek suffix "-tyrannus", meaning "tyrant" or "king". The specific name, xui, honors prominent dinosaur researcher Xu Xing and his contributions to paleontological research in China.

== Description and classification ==
=== Size and ontogenetic age ===
Size of Asiatyrannus compared to a human

Asiatyrannus is a small-medium-sized tyrannosaur. Its nearly complete skull measures 47.5 centimetres (18.7 in) long, and it has an estimated body length of 3.5–4 metres (11–13 ft). In comparison, the mature skull of the closely related Nanuqsaurus from the Prince Creek Formation of North America is estimated at 60–70 centimetres (24–28 in). Since Nanuqsaurus likely had a body size similar to Albertosaurus, Asiatyrannus may represent the only tyrannosaurine in this smaller size class. The Asiatyrannus holotype is about half the length of the contemporary Qianzhousaurus. Zheng et al. (2024) estimated that the Asiatyrannus xui holotype was at least 13 years old at the time of its death, meaning it did not belong to a skeletally mature individual. As such, it would have been larger when fully grown. These researchers claimed it had probably passed through the life stages of most rapid growth, and other tyrannosaurines in similar growth stages are more than twice as large.

In their 2025 description of the early-diverging tyrannosauroid Khankhuuluu, Voris and colleagues claimed that the histology performed and lines of arrested growth (LAGs) identified by Zheng and colleagues the year prior did not support the specimen as having passed the rapid-growth phase, meaning it can not be regarded as mature.

=== Classification ===
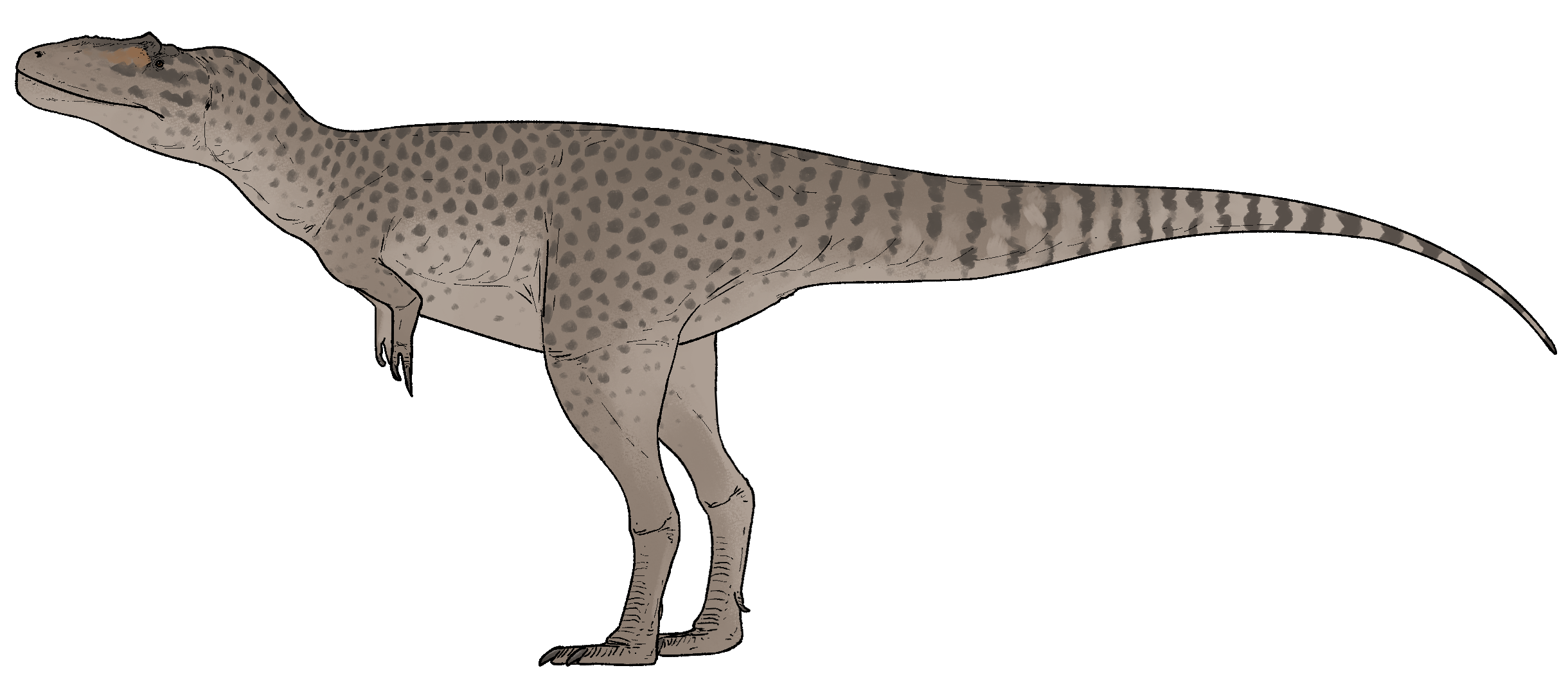
Life restoration

To test the affinities and relationships of Asiatyrannus, Zheng et al. included it in a modified version of the phylogenetic dataset of Carr et al. (2017). They recovered Asiatyrannus as a derived tyrannosaurine member of the family Tyrannosauridae, in a polytomy with the North American Nanuqsaurus. These results are displayed in the cladogram below:

- Tyrannosauridae
  - - Albertosaurus
    - Gorgosaurus
  - Tyrannosaurinae
    - Nanotyrannus
    - - Alioramus spp.
      - Qianzhousaurus
    - - Lythronax
      - Teratophoneus
      - - Asiatyrannus
        - Nanuqsaurus
        - - Daspletosaurus spp.
          - - Zhuchengtyrannus
            - - Tarbosaurus
              - Tyrannosaurus

Using two different phylogenetic techniques, Zanno and Napoli (2025) supported a tyrannosaurine position for Asiatyrannus, recovering it as either a tyrannosaurine diverging after alioramins but before daspletosaurins and tyrannosaurins, or as the sister taxon to Alioramus and Qianzhousaurus within Alioramini. In their 2026 phylogenetic analysis, Longrich et al. recovered Alioramini outside of Tyrannosauridae altogether, with Asiatyrannus placed as the basalmost tyrannosaurine, and Daspletosaurini, Teratophoneini, and Tyrannosaurini as subsequent branches.

=== Validity ===
Size comparison of known Tarbosaurus specimens representing various growth stages

In 2025, Voris and colleagues noted six traits in ZMNH M30360, the Asiatyrannus xui holotype, initially regarded as diagnostic to this species that it shares with Tarbosaurus specimens or other tyrannosaurines (three of which are present only in immature specimens). As such, they reidentified Asiatyrannus as a juvenile tyrannosaurine sharing at least four synapomorphies with a late-diverging clade comprising Alioramini and Tyrannosaurini. They postulated that large Tyrannosaurus-like teeth previously identified from the Nanxiong Formation may in fact belong to a mature form of the same species as Asiatyrannus. The researchers concluded that Asiatyrannus is most parsimoniously regarded as a juvenile member of the Tyrannosaurini that is difficult to distinguish—but is potentially distinct—from Tarbosaurus. The size and proportions of the skull are almost identical to those of juvenile specimens of this genus.

In 2026, Raun and colleagues published a reassessment of Raptorex—another Asian tyrannosauroid known from an immature specimen considered by some researchers to belong to a young Tarbosaurus—and Asiatyrannus. They recognized striking similarities of these genera to specimens widely recognized as juvenile Tarbosaurus bataar, and agreed with Voris et al. (2025) that histological evidence does not support ZMNH M30360 as approaching maturity. They concluded that Asiatyrannus xui and Raptorex kriegsteini are both likely junior synonyms of T. bataar, which is best known from Mongolia. This would drastically expand the known biogeographic range of this species, making it more widespread than Tyrannosaurus rex, its close relative, and other tyrannosaurids.

== Paleoecology ==
Asiatyrannus is known from the Nanxiong Formation, which dates to the end of the Maastrichtian age of the late Cretaceous period. Large teeth indicate the presence of a large tyrannosaurid in the ecosystem that may actually be a mature form of Asiatyrannus. Many other dinosaurs have been described from layers of the formation, including the fellow tyrannosaurid Qianzhousaurus. Other theropods include therizinosaurids (Nanshiungosaurus) and many oviraptorids (Banji, Corythoraptor, Ganzhousaurus, Huanansaurus, Jiangxisaurus, Nankangia, Shixinggia, and Tongtianlong). The somphospondylan sauropods Gannansaurus and Jiangxititan are also known from the formation. The formation's non-dinosaurian fauna includes crocodilians (Jiangxisuchus), lizards (Chianghsia and Tianyusaurus), and turtles (Jiangxichelys).

The Mongolian Nemegt Formation contains a similar fauna, including the large tyrannosaurine Tarbosaurus, two species of the alioramin Alioramus, and smaller tyrannosauroids such as Bagaraatan.

== See also ==
- Timeline of tyrannosaur research
- 2024 in archosaur paleontology
