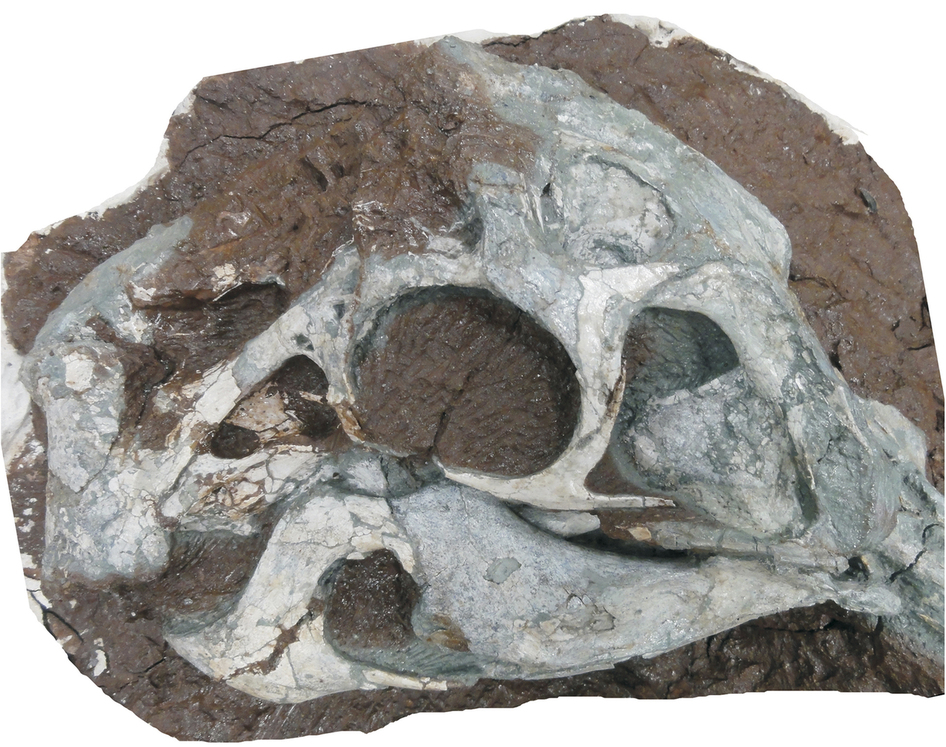
- Skull of holotype specimen

Scientific classification
- Kingdom: Animalia
- Phylum: Chordata
- Clade: Dinosauria
- Clade: Saurischia
- Clade: Theropoda
- Family: †Oviraptoridae
- Genus: †Huanansaurus; Lü et al., 2015
- Species: †H. ganzhouensis

Binomial name
- †Huanansaurus ganzhouensis Lü et al., 2015

Synonyms
- Corythoraptor jacobsi? Lü et al., 2017

= Huanansaurus =

Huanansaurus Temporal range: Late Cretaceous, 72–66 Ma

Extinct genus of dinosaurs

Huanansaurus is an extinct genus of oviraptorid dinosaur that lived approximately 72 million years ago, between the Campanian and Maastrichtian, during the latter part of the Cretaceous period in what is now China, in the Nanxiong Formation.

== Discovery and designation ==
The skeleton of a new oviraptorid Huanansaurus ganzhouensis was uncovered during the construction of the Ganzhou railway station in Jiangxi province, China.

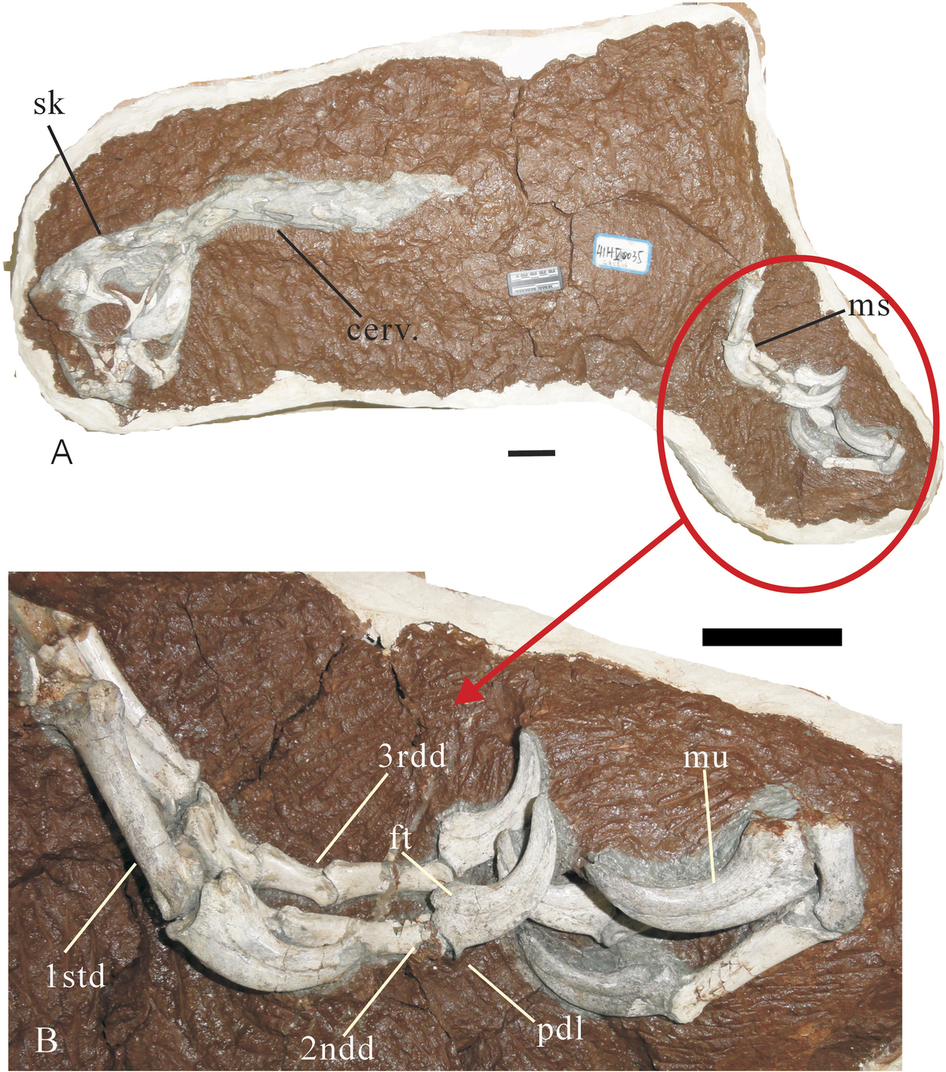
Front parts of the holotype

In 2015, Lü Junchang, Pu Hanyong, Yoshitsugu Kobayashi, Xu Li, Chang Huali, Shang Yuhua, Liu Di, Lee Yuong-Nam, Martin Kundrát and Shen Caizhi named and described the type species Huanansaurus ganzhouensis. The generic name is derived from Huanan, "Southern China". The specific name refers to the provenance from Ganzhou. Huanansaurus was one of eighteen dinosaur taxa from 2015 to be described in open access or free-to-read journals.

The holotype, HGM41HIII-0443, was found in a layer of the Nanxiong Formation dating from the Campanian - Maastrichtian. It consists of a partially articulated, incomplete skeleton which includes a nearly complete skull and lower jaws, the first seven neck vertebrae, a humerus, ulna, radius and hand of the right arm, the left hand, the lower part of the right thighbone, the upper part of the right shinbone, and the distal parts of the right foot. The specimen is part of the collection of the Henan Geological Museum at Zhengzhou.

In 2026, Hao and Xu assigned IVPP V34154, probably from the Tangbian Formation, to Huanansaurus and suggested that Corythoraptor is a junior synonym of the former. The specimen was donated to the Institute of Vertebrate Paleontology and Paleoanthropology and preserved an individual situated on top of a nest.

== Description ==
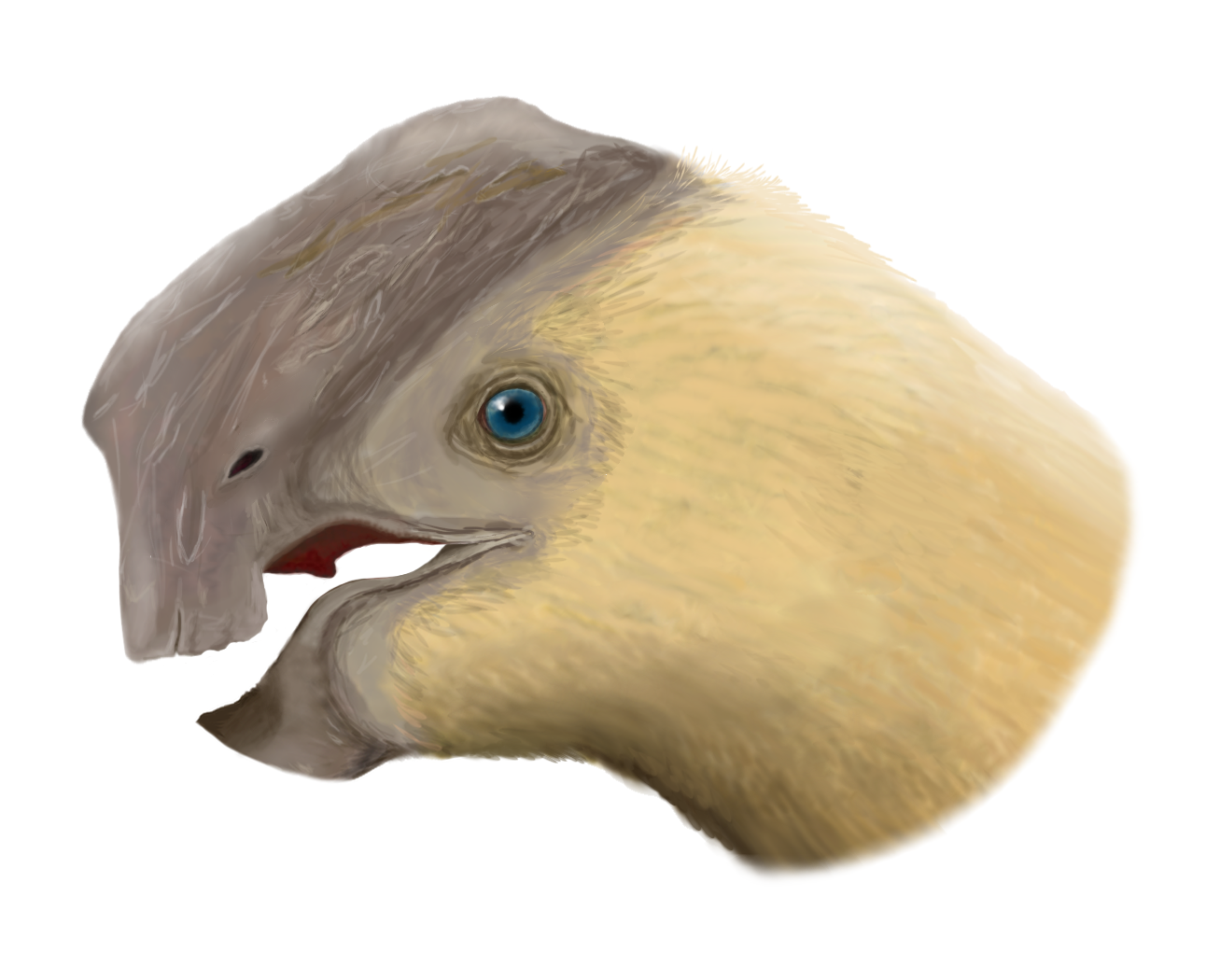
Illustration of the head

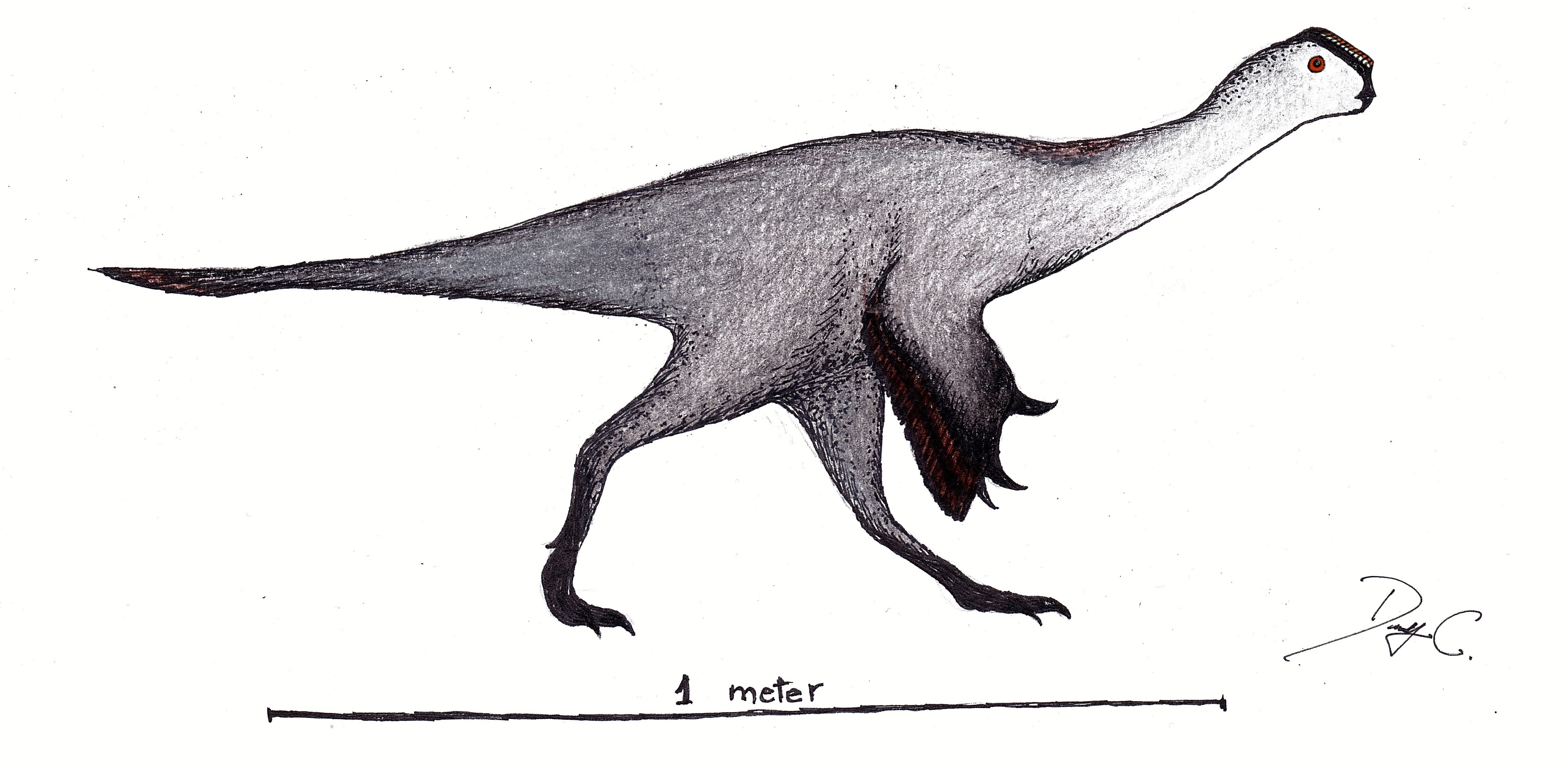
Life restoration

Some unique traits of Huanansaurus have been established. Several of these are autapomorphies. Of the quadrate bone the lower condyles are positioned behind the upper head. The transverse nuchal crest on the rear skull roof is not very prominent. In the lower jaw the angular bone forms a major part of the lower rim of the outer side opening. The front point of the lower jaw is obliquely protruding to above under an angle of less than 45° with the symphysis, the fused point of the lower jaws. The shelf formed by the symphysis is moderately large, equal to about a fifth to a fourth of the total jaw length. The dentary bone is pneumatised. The lower rear branch of the dentary is twisted, causing its outer side to be somewhat directed to below. The first metacarpal is long and slender with its transverse width equal to a fifth of its length. The hand claws have prominent lips on their upper rears.

In addition, a unique combination of in themselves not unique traits is present. The temporal opening on the skull roof is round and much smaller than the temporal opening of the skull side. The rear branch of the praemaxilla touches the lacrimal bone and features a prominent opening at this point, on the rear underside. The upper rear branch of the dentary covers the outer side opening of the lower jaw and has a concave lower rim.

Huanansaurus was, within the Oviraptoridae, placed in the Oviraptorinae, as a sister species of Citipati. Below is a cladogram of Oviraptoridae based on the phylogenetic analysis of Lü et al. (2017).

- Oviraptoridae
  - - Nankangia jiangxiensis
    - - Yulong mini
      - Nomingia gobiensis
  - - Oviraptor philoceratops
    - - Rinchenia mongoliensis
      - - Citipati sp.
        - - Citipati osmolskae
          - - Corythoraptor jacobsi
            - Huanansaurus ganzhouensis
    - - - Tongtianlong limosus
        - - Wulatelong gobiensis
          - Banji long
      - - Shixinggia oblita
        - - Khaan mckennai
          - - Conchoraptor gracilis
            - - Machairasaurus leptonychus
              - - Jiangxisaurus ganzhouensis
                - - Ganzhousaurus nankangensis
                  - - Nemegtomaia barsboldi
                    - - "Ingenia" yanshini
                      - Heyuannia huangi

== See also ==
- Timeline of oviraptorosaur research
