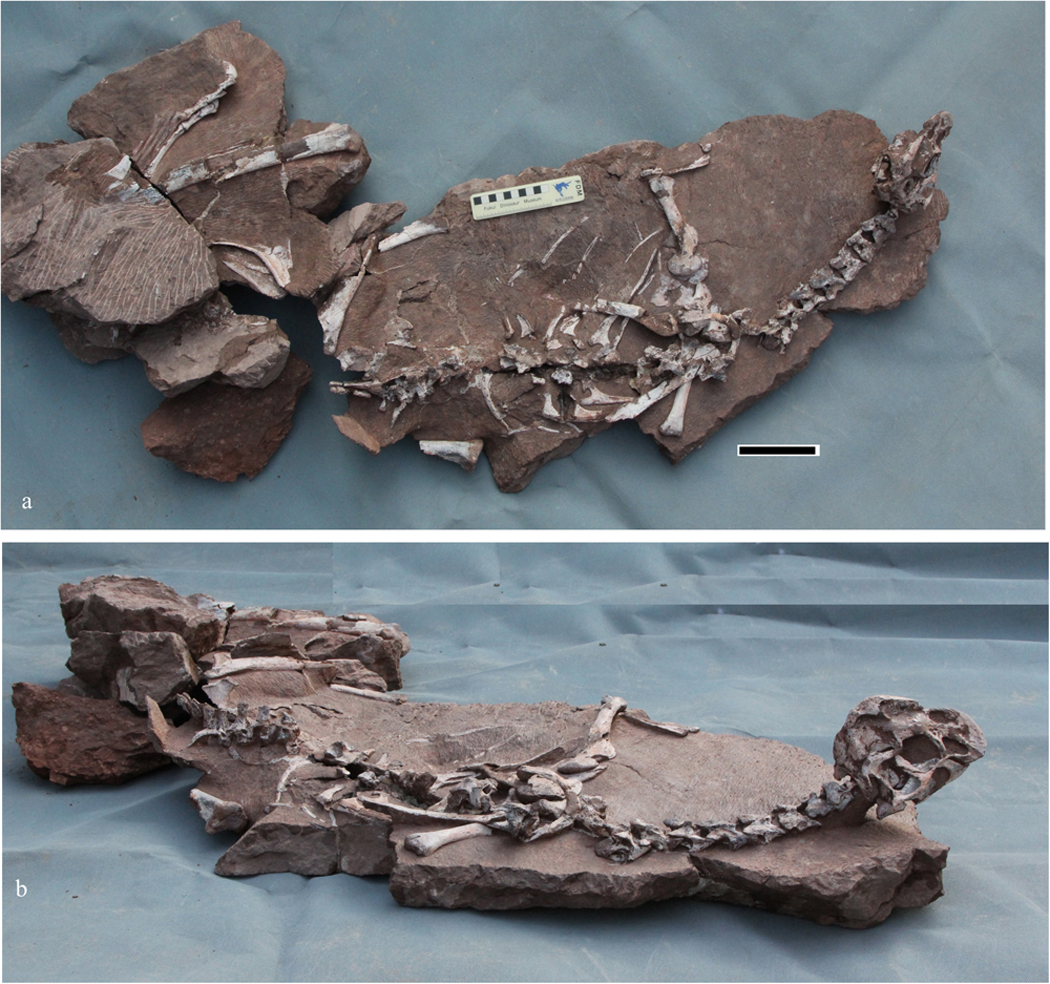
- Holotype skeleton of Tongtianlong limosus

Scientific classification
- Kingdom: Animalia
- Phylum: Chordata
- Clade: Dinosauria
- Clade: Saurischia
- Clade: Theropoda
- Family: †Oviraptoridae
- Genus: †Tongtianlong; Lü et al., 2016
- Species: †T. limosus

Binomial name
- †Tongtianlong limosus Lü et al., 2016

= Tongtianlong =

Tongtianlong Temporal range: Late Cretaceous, 66.7 Ma

Extinct genus of dinosaurs

Tongtianlong (meaning "Tongtianyan dragon") is a genus of oviraptorid theropod dinosaurs that lived in the late Maastrichtian age of the Late Cretaceous epoch of the Cretaceous period. It contains one species, T. limosus.

== Description ==
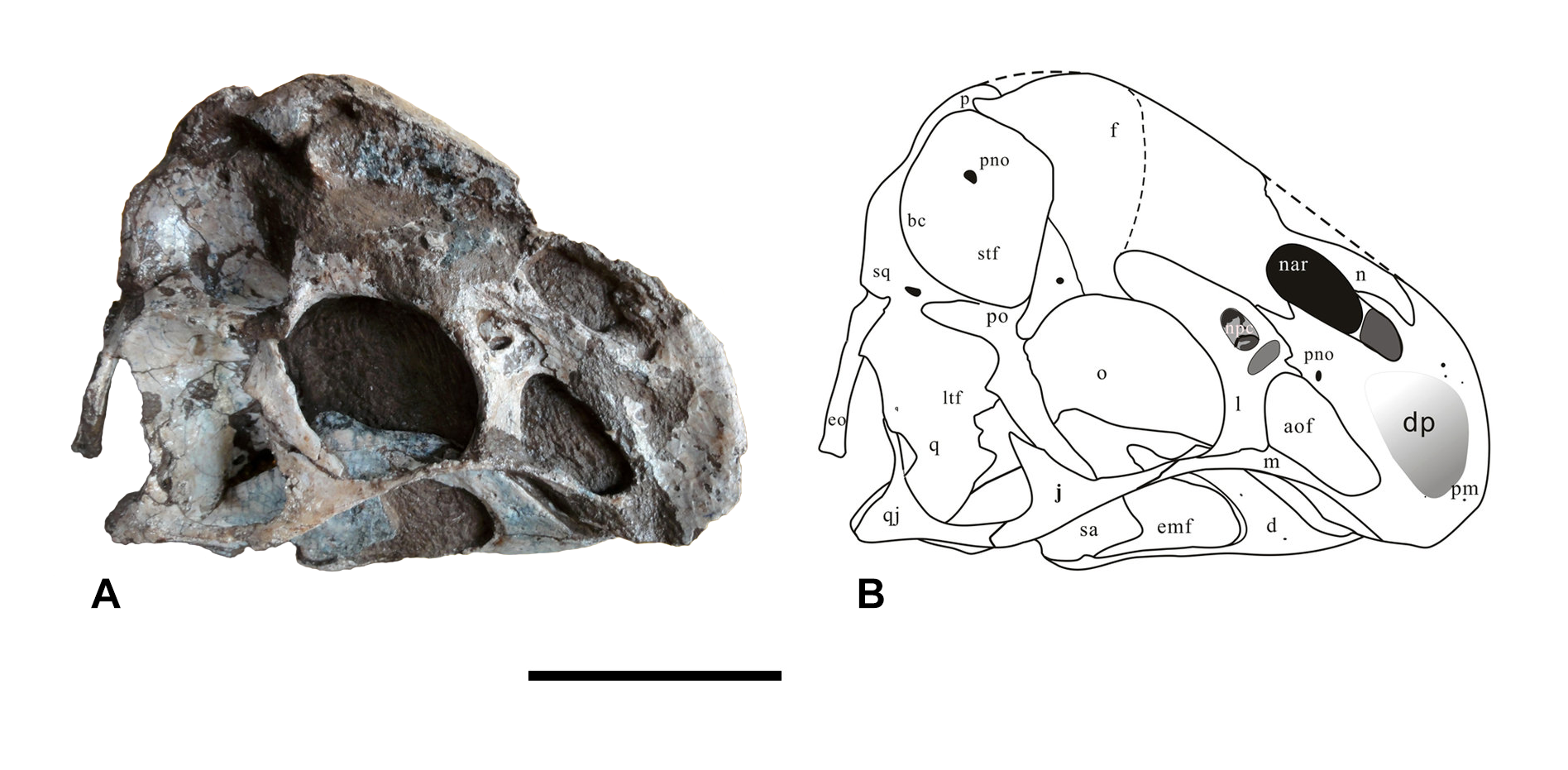
Skull of Tongtianlong limosus

Tongtianlong was a sheep-sized member of the oviraptorids, a group of omnivorous, feathered, bird-like theropods. The describers of Tongtianlong recognized that it possessed a set of distinctive characteristics that differentiated it both from other oviraptorosaurs. In particular, unlike other oviraptorids, the crest of Tongtianlong was shaped like a dome, with its highest point just behind the eye socket; and the front edge of the toothless premaxilla, which would have supported its beak, was very rounded.

Additionally, there is a distinct ridge on the front margin of the parietal bone, wedged between the frontal bones; the shaft of the lacrimal bone, which is located in front of the eye socket, is wide, flattened, and plate-like seen from the side; the foramen magnum (a hole in the back of the skull) is smaller than the occipital condyle (the boss forming the skull-neck joint); there is no ridge on the bottom of the front lower jaws, which is also not strongly downturned; and the xiphoid process does not flare out from the sternum behind the ribs. Other characteristics of the skull separate Tongtianlong from its contemporaries; for instance, the nostril is situated much higher than the antorbital fenestra, a trait seen otherwise only in Nemegtomaia and Rinchenia.

== Discovery and naming ==
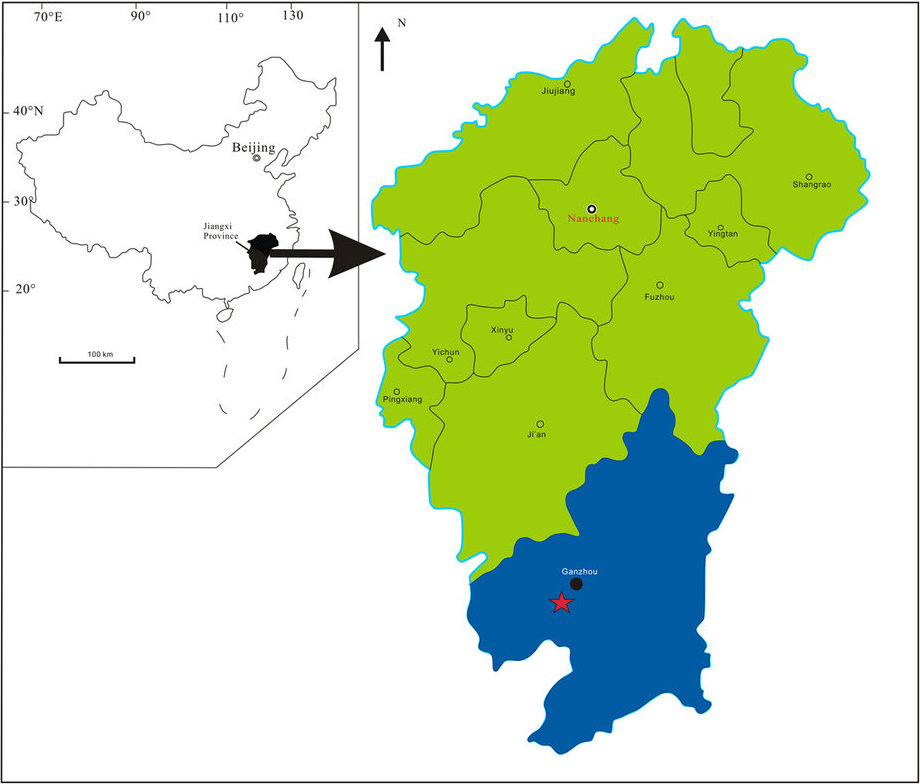
Map of the fossil locality

The holotype of Tongtianlong, specimen number DYM-2013-8, was discovered during the construction of a new high school near Ganxian District in Jiangxi Province, China. The site where it was found is part of the Nanxiong Formation, which dates to the Maastrichtian epoch (although a more precise dating has not yet been conducted). The specimen is currently stored in the Dongyang Museum. While the exceptionally well-preserved specimen was likely originally complete, portions of the arms, right leg, and tail were destroyed by the TNT blasting which unearthed the fossil. Near the hip, a drill hole that was used to place TNT can be seen.

The skeleton was preserved in an unusual pose, with a raised head and splayed arms; while it is difficult to tell exactly what led to this pose, it has been speculatively suggested that the specimen died while it was trapped in mud and trying to free itself. The genus name of Tongtianlong combines a reference to the nearby Tongtianyan (Chinese: 通天岩) grotto and the suffix -long (Chinese: 龍, "dragon"). "Tongtian" also is a Chinese phrase meaning "road to heaven". The specific name, limosus (the Latin word for "muddy"), refers to how the specimen was preserved in mudstone. It was first described and named by Lü Junchang, Chen Rongjun, Stephen L. Brusatte, et al.

== Classification ==
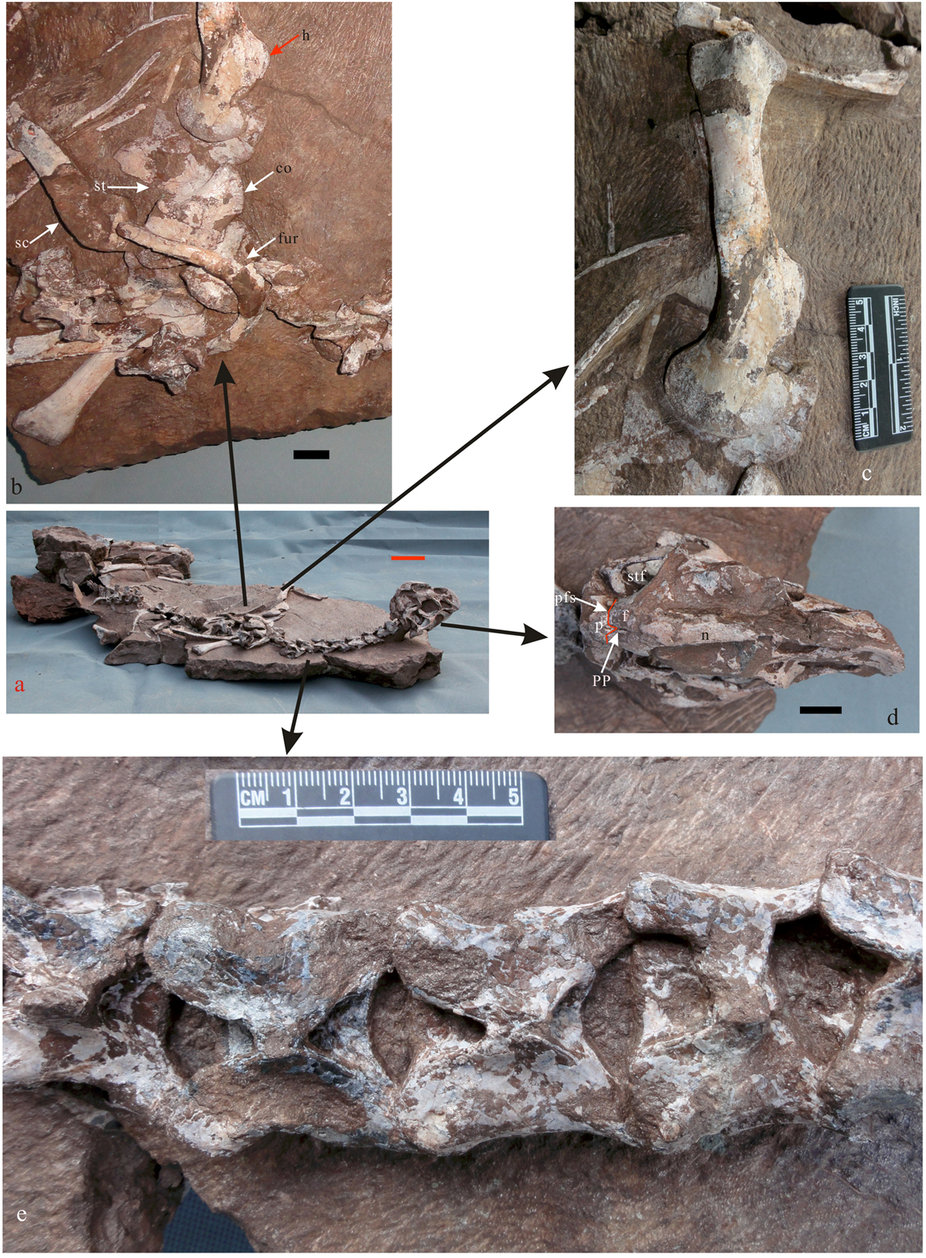
Elements of the holotype

In 2016, Tongtianlong was found to be a member of the Oviraptoridae, as a close relative of Banji and Wulatelong. The results of the phylogenetic analysis conducted are partially reproduced below.

- Oviraptoridae
  - Nankangia jiangxiensis
  - Oviraptor philoceratops
  - - Yulong mini
    - Nomingia mongoliensis
  - - Rinchenia mongoliensis
    - - Zamyn Khondt "Citipati"
      - - Huanansaurus ganzhouensis
        - Citipati osmolskae
  - - - Tongtianlong limosus
      - - Wulatelong gobiensis
        - Banji long
    - - Shixinggia oblita
      - - Khaan mckennai
        - - Conchoraptor gracilis
          - - Wulatelong gobiensis
            - - Machairasaurus leptonychus
              - - Jiangxisaurus ganzhouensis
                - - Ganzhousaurus nankangensis
                  - - Nemegtomaia barsboldi
                    - - Ajancingenia yashini
                      - Heyuannia huangi

== Paleoecology ==
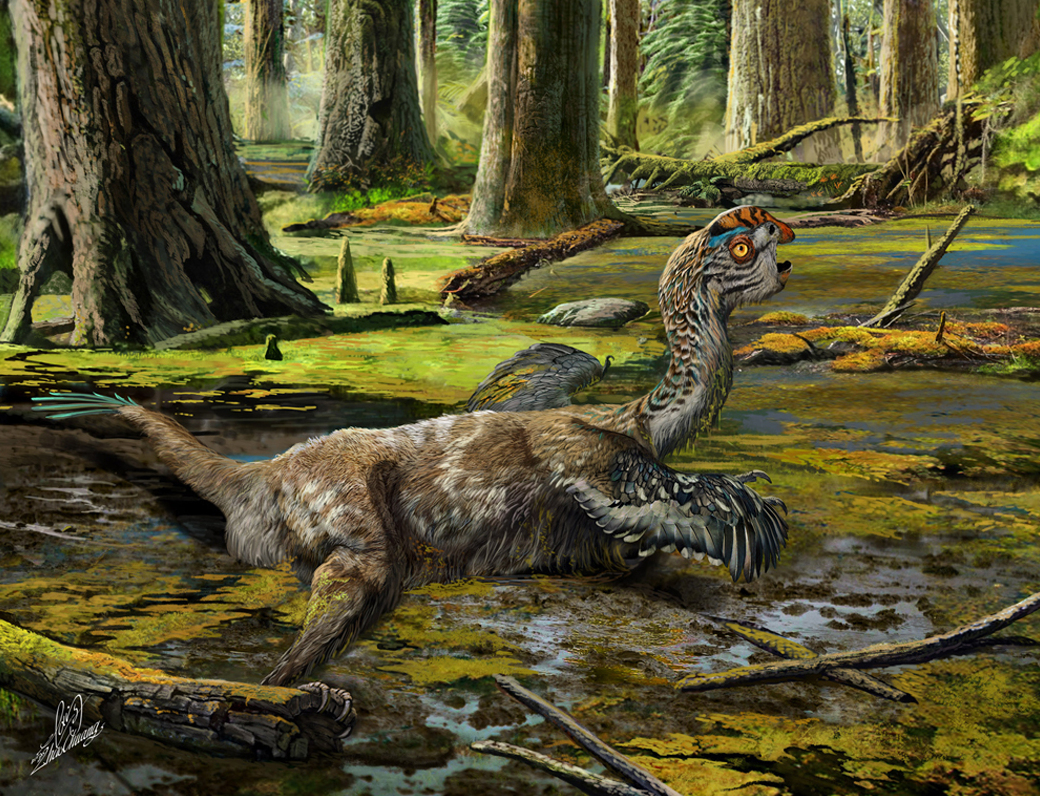
Life reconstruction of Tongtianlong limosus and speculative death conditions

Tongtianlong is the sixth oviraptorid described from the Nanxiong Formation, after Banji, Ganzhousaurus, Jiangxisaurus, Nankangia, and Huanansaurus, in that order. Given the variation in size among these oviraptorids (for instance, Banji is much smaller than Tongtianlong), it is reasonable to hypothesize that some of them might be growth stages of others; however, it is more likely that they represent genuinely distinct animals, since juvenile oviraptorid specimens show that their anatomy does not change significantly with age.

The describers of Tongtianlong suggested that this diversity is indicative of an evolutionary radiation of oviraptorids that occurred just prior to the Cretaceous–Paleogene extinction event. However, the possibility that these species come from different points in time cannot be excluded, due to a lack of study on the stratigraphy and age of the Nanxiong Formation.

== See also ==
- 2016 in paleontology
