= Wulatelong =

Wulatelong Temporal range: Campanian, 83.6–72.1 Ma

Scientific classification
- Kingdom: Animalia
- Phylum: Chordata
- Class: Reptilia
- Clade: Dinosauria
- Clade: Saurischia
- Clade: Theropoda
- Family: †Oviraptoridae
- Genus: †Wulatelong; Xu et al., 2013

Type species
- †Wulatelong gobiensis Xu et al., 2013

Extinct genus of dinosaurs

Wulatelong is an extinct genus of basal oviraptorid dinosaur known from the Late Cretaceous Wulansuhai Formation (Campanian stage) of Bayan Mandahu, Linhe District of Inner Mongolia, northern China. It contains a single species, Wulatelong gobiensis.

== History ==
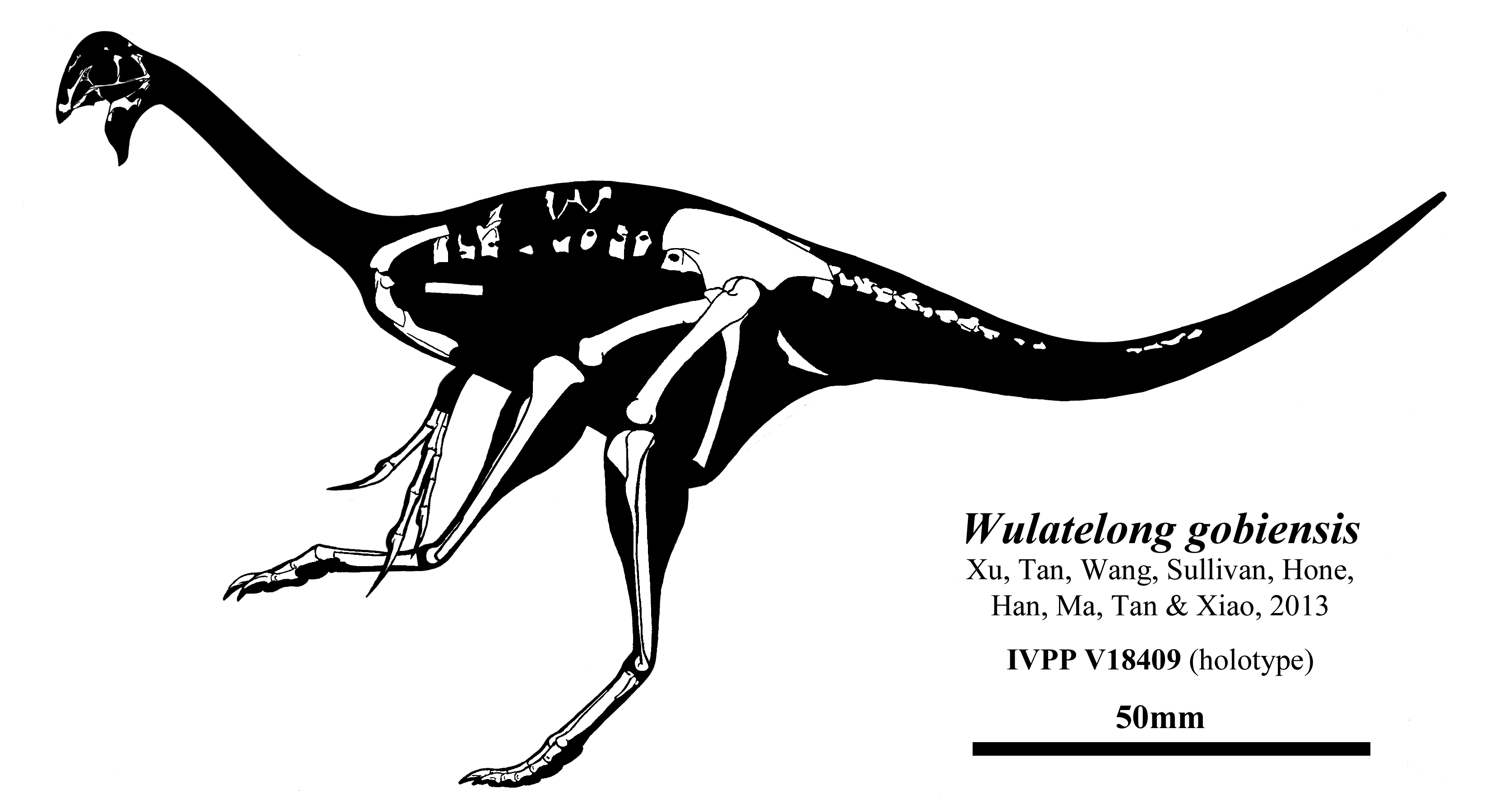
Skeletal reconstruction

The fossils of Wulatelong, representing a single nearly-complete skeleton, now cataloged IVPP V 18409, were discovered in 2009 in the Bayan Mandahu area of Wulatehouqi, Inner Mongolia, a fossil-rich area which has yielded many recent dinosaur discoveries. The authors of the paper describing Wulatelong had previously described the dromaeosaurid Linheraptor (2010), the alvarezsaurid Linhenykus (2011), and the troodontid Linhevenator (2011). Wulatelong was described by Xu et al. in 2013. The generic name derives from Wulate, where the fossils were discovered, and long, the Chinese word for "dragon". The specific name, gobiensis, refers to the Gobi Desert.

== Classification ==
Wulatelong is an oviraptorid dinosaur, the sister taxon of Banji. Oviraptorids were bird-like, herbivorous and omnivorous theropods characterized by toothless, parrot-like beaks, and often elaborate crests. They are known only from the Late Cretaceous of Asia.

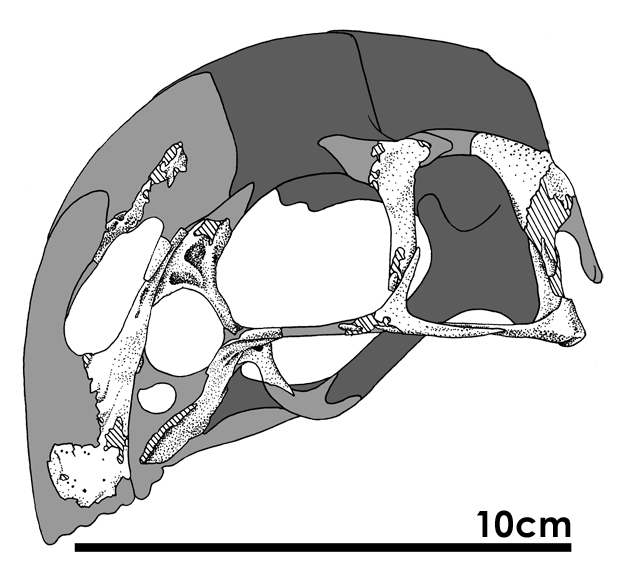
Restored skull

- Caenagnathoidea
  - Caenagnathidae
  - Oviraptoridae
    - - Nankangia jiangxiensis
      - - Yulong mini
        - Nomingia gobiensis
    - - Oviraptor philoceratops
      - - - Rinchenia mongoliensis
          - - Zamyn Khondt oviraptorid
            - Citipati osmolskae
        - - - Wulatelong gobiensis
            - Banji long
          - - Shixinggia oblita
            - - Jiangxisaurus ganzhouensis
              - Ganzhousaurus nankangensis
              - Nemegtomaia barsboldi
              - Machairasaurus leptonychus
              - Conchoraptor gracilis
              - Khaan mckennai
              - - Ingenia yanshini
                - Heyuannia huangi

== Paleoecology ==
Wulatelong shared their habitat in the Bayan Mandahu with a number of other dinosaurian fauna. These included the ceratopsians Protoceratops and Magnirostris, the ankylosaurian Pinacosaurus, and a number of other theropods: the dromaeosaurids Velociraptor, Papiliovenator and Linheraptor, the oviraptorosaurian Machairasaurus, the alvarezsauroid Linhenykus, and the troodontid Linhevenator. The authors of the paper describing Wulatelong concluded that the Bayan Mandahu fauna "differs fundamentally in composition from the classical Djadokhta fauna, perhaps because of a difference in age" or due to environmental factors.

== See also ==
- Timeline of oviraptorosaur research
- 2013 in paleontology
