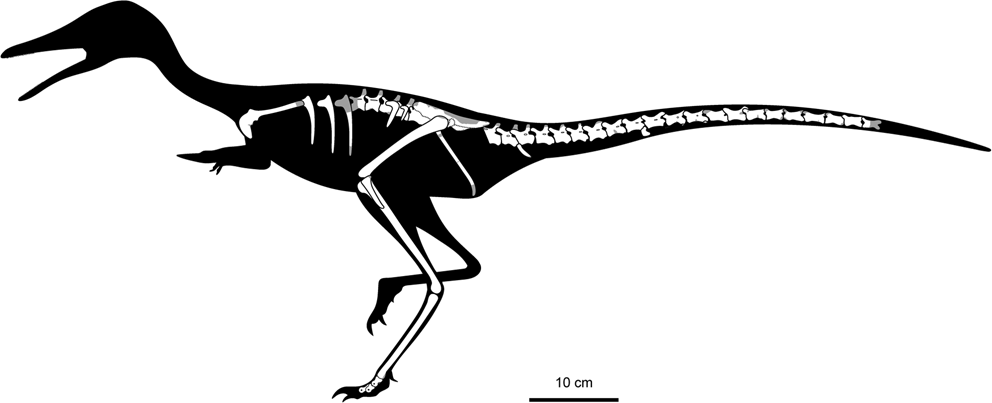
- Skeletal reconstruction of Nemegtonykus, showing known material, scale bar=10cm

Scientific classification
- Kingdom: Animalia
- Phylum: Chordata
- Class: Reptilia
- Clade: Dinosauria
- Clade: Saurischia
- Clade: Theropoda
- Family: †Alvarezsauridae
- Subfamily: †Parvicursorinae
- Genus: †Nemegtonykus; Lee et al., 2019

Type species
- †Nemegtonykus citus Lee et al., 2019

= Nemegtonykus =

Nemegtonykus Temporal range: Late Cretaceous, Maastrichtian

Extinct genus of dinosaurs

Nemegtonykus (meaning "Nemegt claw") is a genus of alvarezsaurid dinosaur from the Late Cretaceous ( Maastrichtian) Nemegt Formation of Mongolia. The type and only species is Nemegtonykus citus. It is the second alvarezsaurid known from the Nemegt Formation, preceded by Mononykus.

== Discovery ==
Size comparison

In 2008, the Korea-Mongolia International Dinosaur Expedition at the Altan Uul III site in the Gobi Desert excavated a dense concentration of theropod skeletons. Some of these were of Gobiraptor as well as a yet undescribed oviraptorid but three were of Alvarezsauridae. One specimen, MPC-D 100/206, was considered cf. Mononykus sp. but the other two represented a species new to science.

In 2019, the type species Nemegtonykus citus was named and described by Lee Sungjin, Park Jin-Young, Lee Yuong-Nam, Kim Su-Hwan, Lü Junchang, Rinchen Barsbold and Khishigjav Tsogtbaatar. The generic name combines a reference to the Nemegt with a Greek ὄνυξ, onyx, "claw", analogous to Mononykus. The specific name means "the fast one" in Latin.

The holotype, MPC-D 100/203, was found in a layer of the Nemegt Formation (perhaps late Campanian - early Maastrichtian). It consists of a partial skeleton lacking the skull. It contains six back vertebrae, two sacral vertebrae, twenty-one tail vertebrae, five ribs, the left shoulder girdle, the left pubic bone, parts of other pelvic bones, the left hindlimb and the right shinbone. The left hindlimb and the tail were articulated. The other bones were associated on a small surface.
