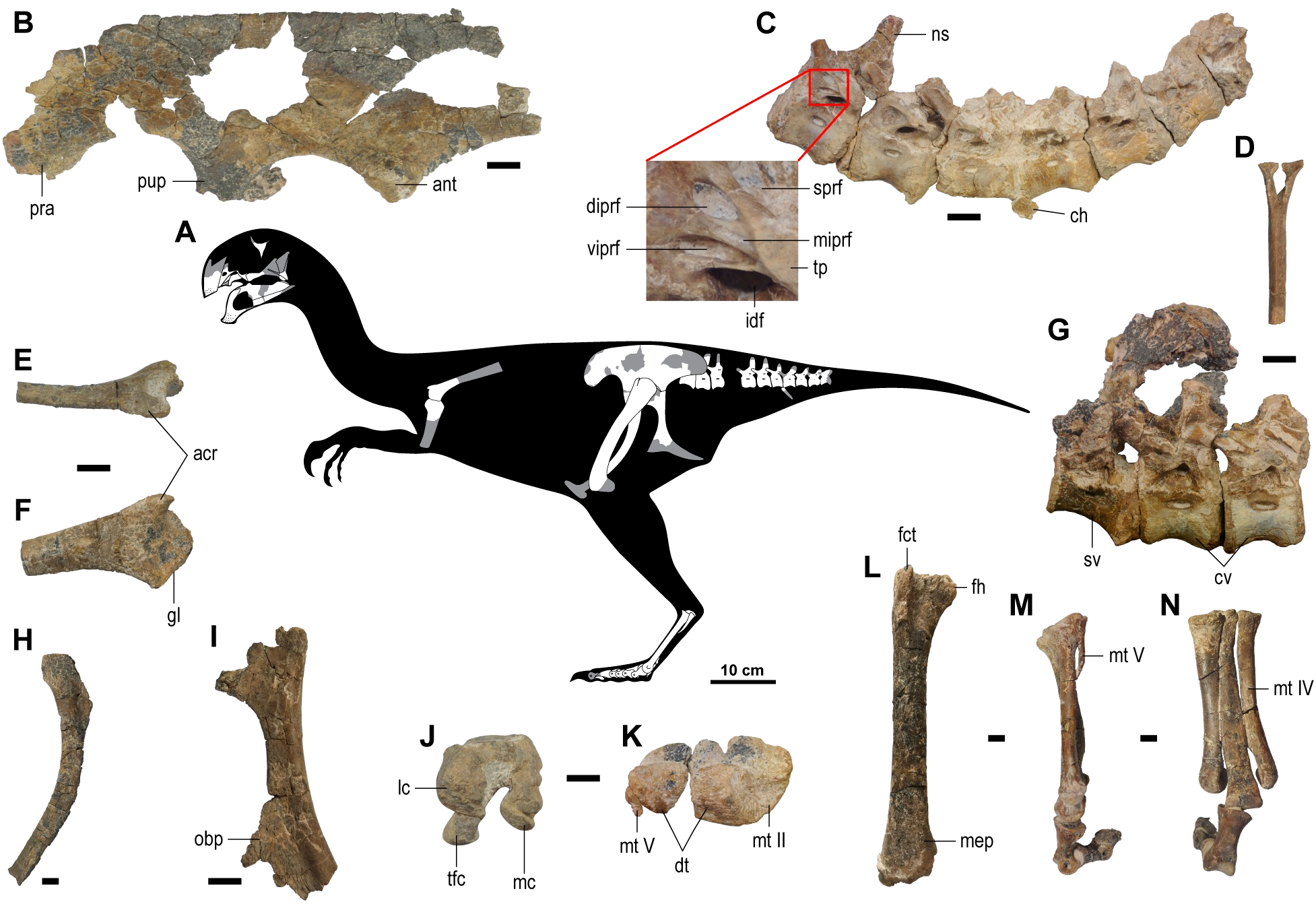
- Postcranial elements of the holotype and skeletal reconstruction

Scientific classification
- Kingdom: Animalia
- Phylum: Chordata
- Class: Reptilia
- Clade: Dinosauria
- Clade: Saurischia
- Clade: Theropoda
- Family: †Oviraptoridae
- Genus: †Gobiraptor; Lee et al., 2019
- Species: †G. minutus

Binomial name
- †Gobiraptor minutus Lee et al., 2019

= Gobiraptor =

Gobiraptor Temporal range: Late Cretaceous, 72–70 Ma

Extinct genus of dinosaurs

Gobiraptor is a genus of oviraptorid maniraptoran dinosaur from the Maastrichtian-aged Nemegt Formation of Mongolia. The type and only species is Gobiraptor minutus, known from a single incomplete specimen—the holotype MPC-D 102/111. It has been found not to be closely related to the other oviraptorids it shared its environment with.

== Discovery and naming ==
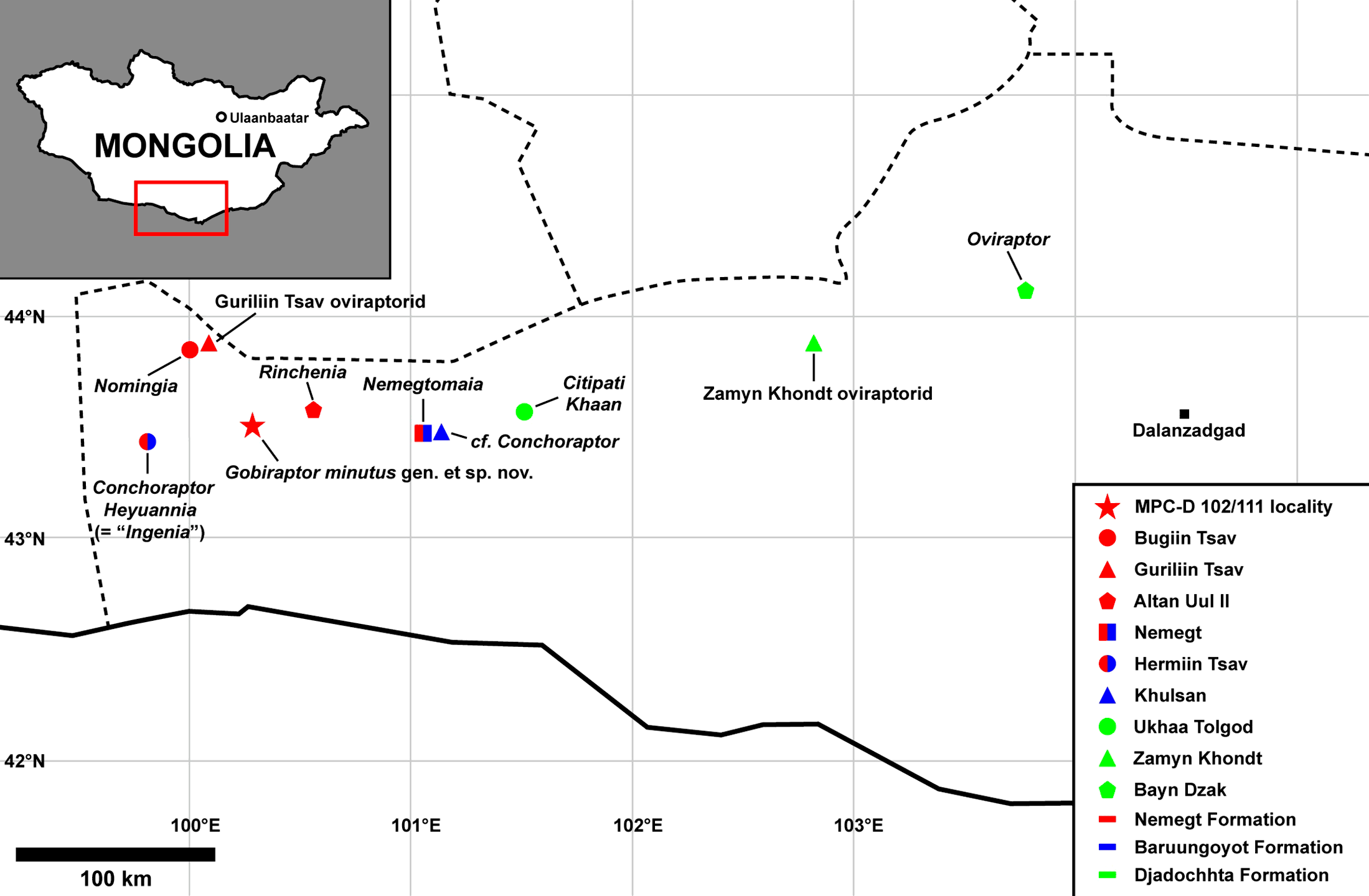
Map showing the occurrence of Gobiraptor (★) and other oviraptorids in the southern Gobi Desert

In 2008, the Korea-Mongolia International Dinosaur Expedition discovered an oviraptorosaurian skeleton at the Altan Uul III site in Ömnögovi Province, in the Gobi Desert. The fossil was prepared by Do Kwon Kim.

In 2019, the type species Gobiraptor minutus was named and described by Sungjin Lee, Yuong-Nam Lee, Anusuya Chinsamy, Lü Junchang, Rinchen Barsbold and Khishigjav Tsogtbaatar. The generic name combines a reference to the Gobi with a Latin raptor, "robber". The specific name means "the minute one" in Latin, a reference to the small size of the type specimen. Because the name was published in an electronic publication, Life Science Identifiers were needed for its validity. These were 16FF31F-8492-4BB4-9961-53E586A136EC for the genus and 53F0E7D7-EB76-4B8F-8801-AED4FE792E8C for the species.

The holotype, MPC-D 102/111, was found in a layer of the Nemegt Formation, probably dating from the early Maastrichtian, about seventy million years old. It consists of a partial skeleton with skull. It contains the lower side of the skull, a left postorbital, the lower jaws, the last sacral vertebra connected to the two front tail vertebrae, a series of seven front or middle tail vertebrae, chevrons, the right shoulder joint with a piece of the humerus, the pelvis, both thighbones and the left foot. It represents a juvenile individual.

== Description ==
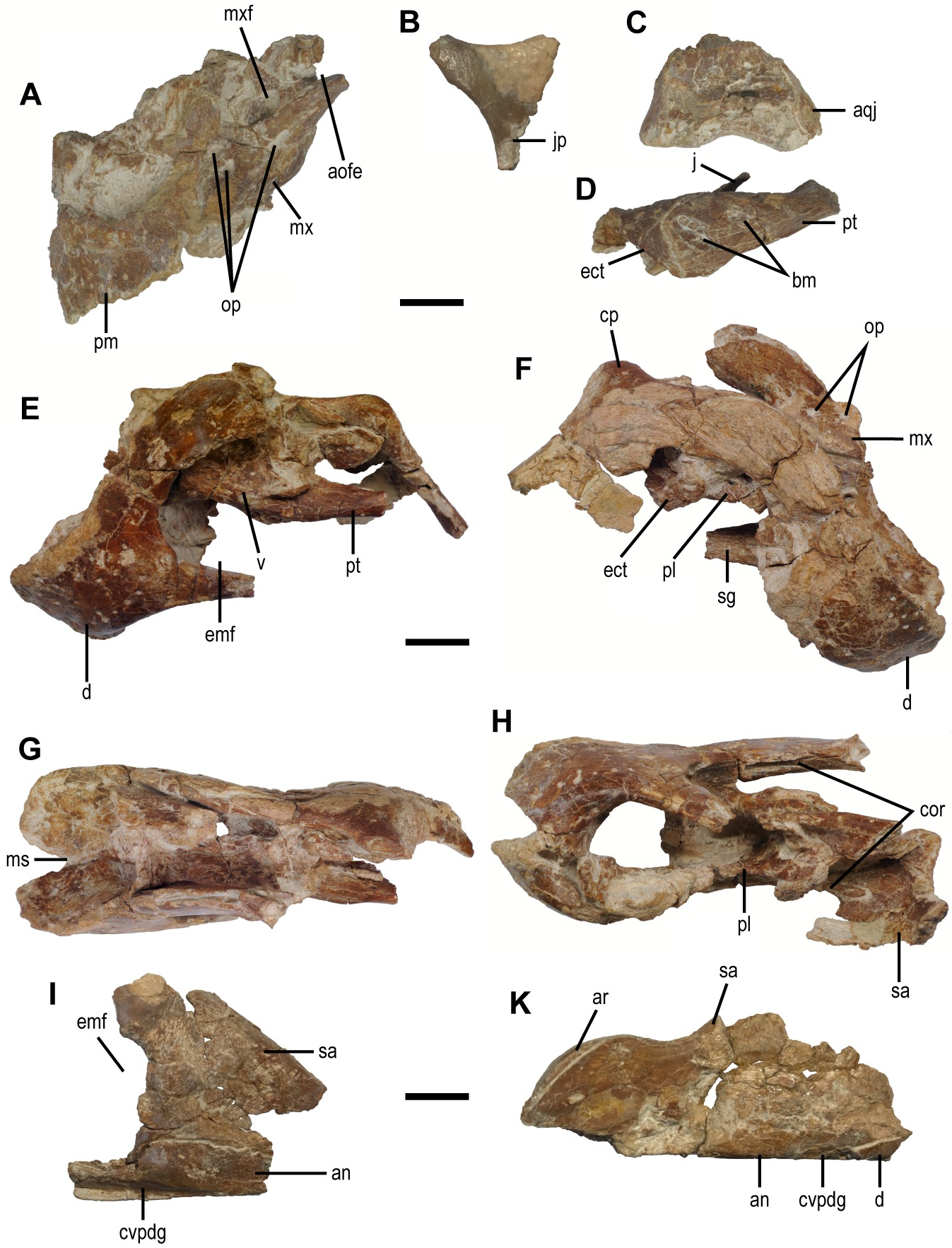
Cranial elements

The describing authors indicated a number of distinguishing traits. Some of these are autapomorphies, unique derived characters. The quadrate has a flat facet contacting the quadratojugal. The symphysis of the lower jaws, in which they are fused at the front, is extremely thickened at the top front end, while the top surface is expanded to the rear. Each dentary has at the top inner side a rudimentary triturating shelf pierced by four small oval occlusal foramina. The same shelf has a weakly developed ridge running along its inner edge. The coronoid bone wedges into the underside of the top rear process of the dentary.

Additionally, a unique combination is present of traits that in themselves are not unique. The part of the dentary in front of the large outer side opening is horizontally elongated. The dentary lacks a lower branch at the front, contributing to the symphysis. A separate coronoid bone is present. On the thighbone the minor trochanter is separated from the major trochanter by a clear cleft.

== Paleobiology ==
Gobiraptor lived in a mesic habitat, one that was half-dry. As its foot was not arctometatarsal and the animal thus was not a specialised running form, the describing authors considered it unlikely that Gobiraptor was a carnivore. Each dentarium had a grinding plate at the top with small holes on the surface. The thick front lower jaws were specialized for crushing food such as bivalves (durophagy) and seeds (granivory).

== See also ==
- Timeline of oviraptorosaur research
