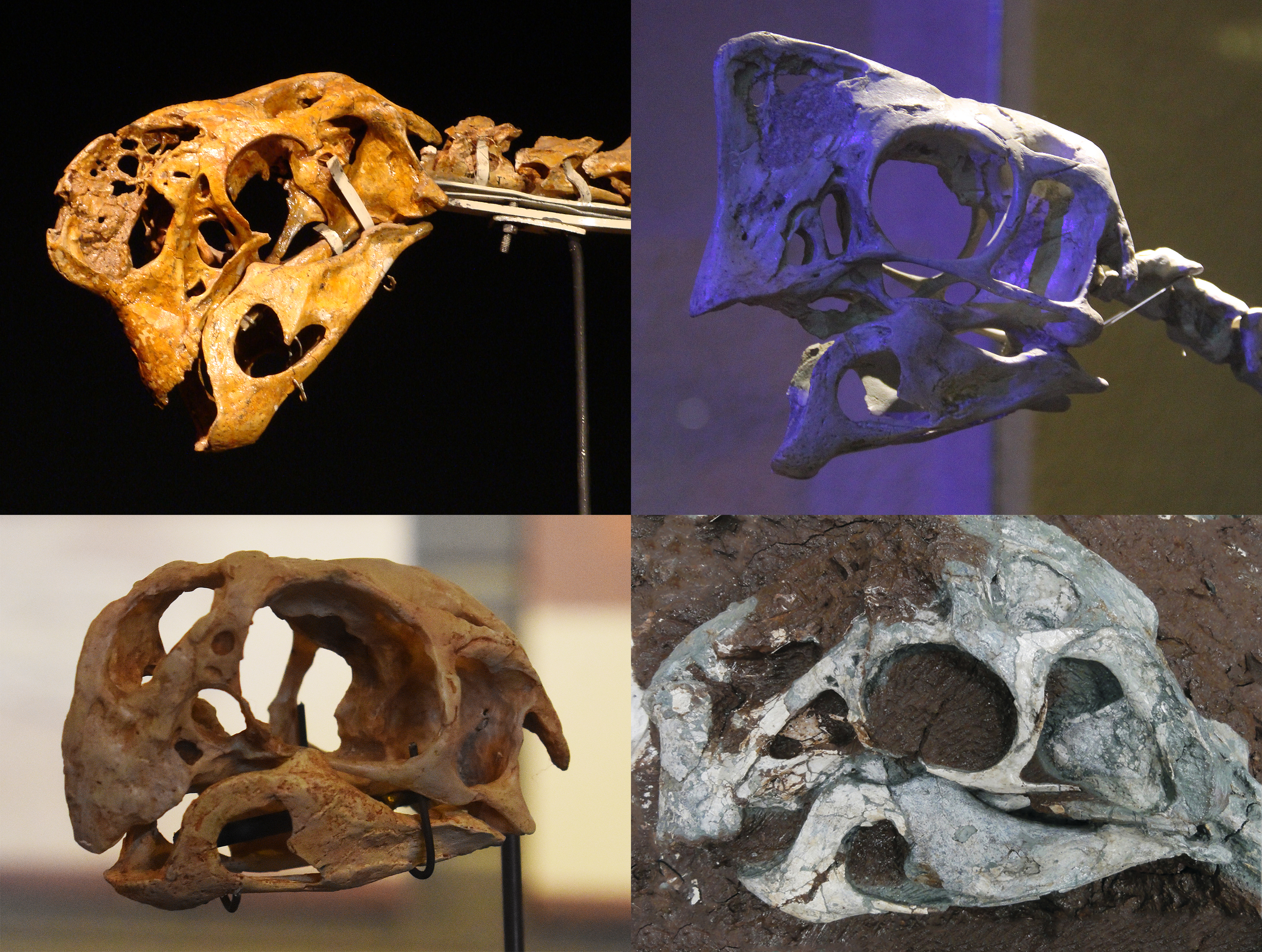
- Montage of four oviraptorids. Clockwise from top left: Citipati? sp., Nemegtomaia, Huanansaurus and Conchoraptor

Scientific classification
- Kingdom: Animalia
- Phylum: Chordata
- Class: Reptilia
- Clade: Dinosauria
- Clade: Saurischia
- Clade: Theropoda
- Superfamily: †Caenagnathoidea
- Family: †Oviraptoridae; Barsbold, 1976

Type species
- †Oviraptor philoceratops Osborn, 1924

Subgroups
- †Banji; †Gobiraptor; †Luoyanggia; †Nankangia?; †Nomingia?; †Shixinggia; †Tongtianlong; †Wulatelong; †Yulong; †Oviraptorinae; †Citipati; †Corythoraptor; †Huanansaurus; †Oviraptor; †Rinchenia; †Heyuanninae; †Conchoraptor; †Ganzhousaurus; †Heyuannia; †Jiangxisaurus; †Khaan; †Machairasaurus; †Nemegtomaia; †Oksoko

= Oviraptoridae =

Oviraptorids Temporal range: Late Cretaceous, 84–66 Ma

Extinct family of dinosaurs

Oviraptoridae is a group of bird-like, herbivorous or omnivorous maniraptoran dinosaurs. Oviraptorids are characterized by their toothless, parrot-like beaks and, in some cases, elaborate crests. They were generally small, measuring between one and two metres long in most cases, though some possible oviraptorids were enormous. Oviraptorids are currently known only from the Late Cretaceous in Asia, with the most well-known species and complete specimens found only in the Gobi Desert of Mongolia and northwestern China.

== Description ==
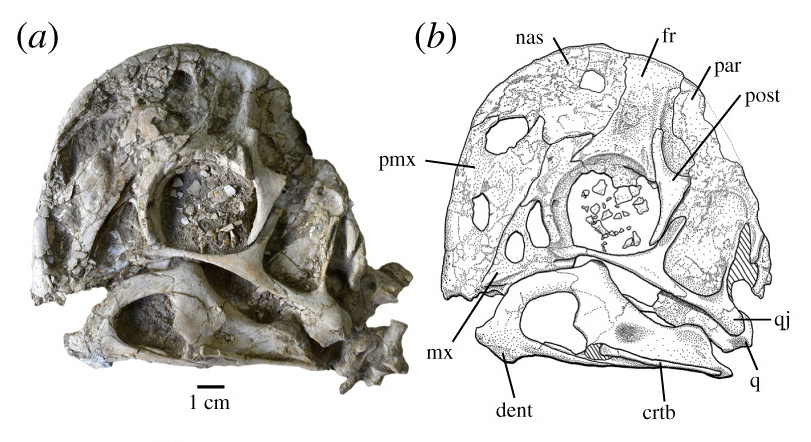
Skull of Oksoko

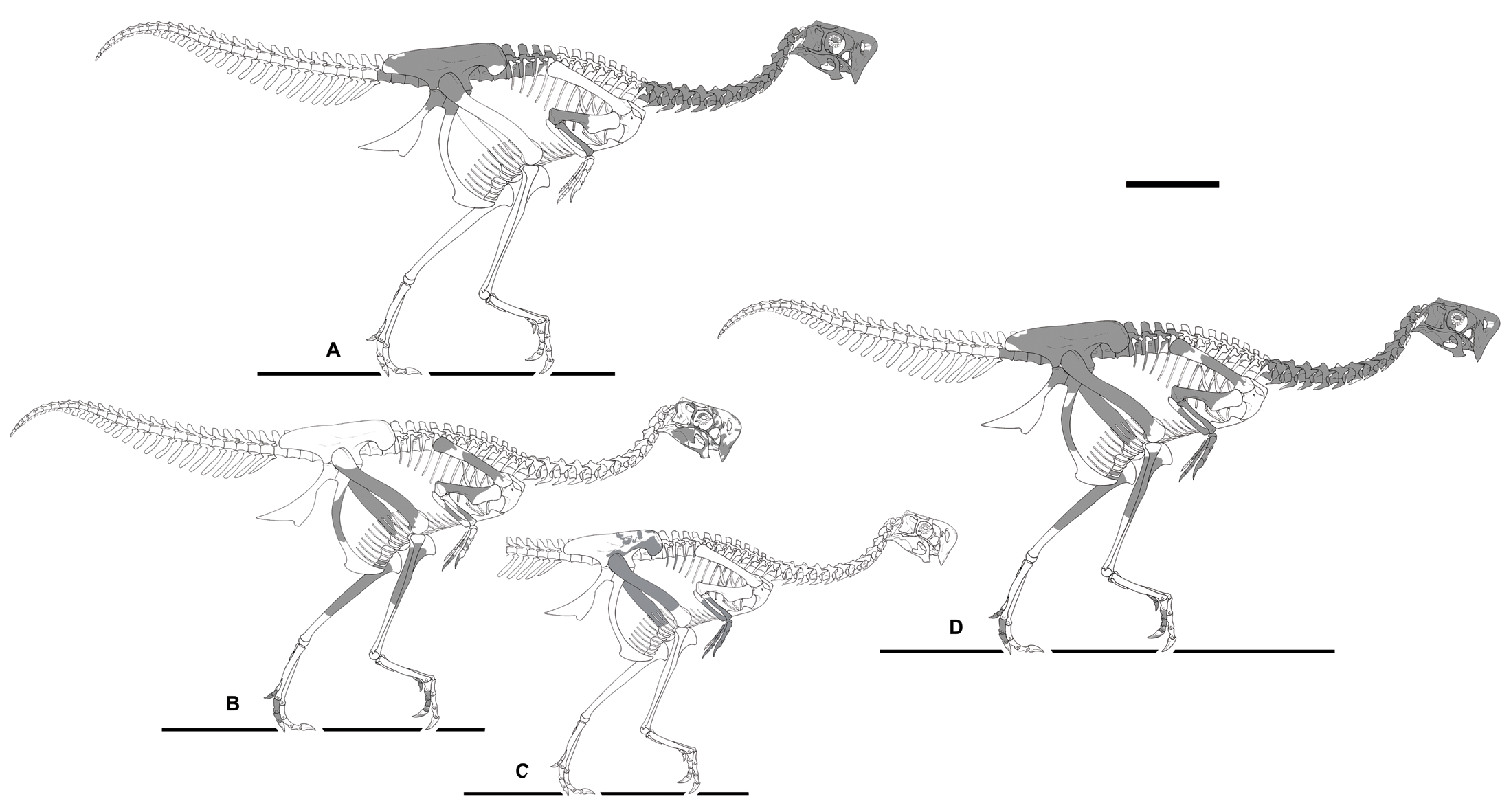
Skeletal diagrams of Nemegtomaia

The most characteristic feature of this group is the skull structure. Oviraptorids had short snouts and very deep mandibles. Some taxa (such as Citipati, Corythoraptor, Rinchenia) had a midline crest on top of the skull, resembling that of a cassowary. Other distinguishing characteristics include a bony spike intruding on the mandibular fenestra, nostrils placed very high and far back on the snout, an extremely thin bony bar beneath the eye, and highly pneumatized skull bones. Like their relatives the caenagnathids, the jaws were edentulous (with no teeth), having instead two small bony projections on the roof of the mouth.

== Classification ==
The classification of the oviraptorids has been controversial. Most studies divide oviraptorosaurs into two primary sub-groups, the Caenagnathidae and the Oviraptoridae. However, some phylogenetic studies have suggested that many traditional members of the Caenagnathidae may be more closely related to the crested oviraptorids. Because of this, and the fact that at least one study found that Caenagnathus itself may not have been part of the 'caenagnathid' group, Tom Holtz (2010) placed that group close to the Oviraptoridae and termed it the Elmisauridae, though this idea has not gained consensus among other researchers.

The Oviraptoridae itself is traditionally divided into two "subfamilies": the small, short-armed, and mainly crestless subfamily Heyuanniinae and the larger, crested, long-armed Oviraptorinae (Oviraptor + Citipati). Some phylogenetic studies have shown that Oviraptor is the most primitive known oviraptorid, thus making Citipati a closer relative of the "ingeniines" and this traditional division into crestless and crested forms artificial.

Other possible oviraptorids include Nomingia gobiensis, Gigantoraptor erlianensis, Jiangxisaurus ganzhouensis and Shixinggia oblita. All four have been suggested to be oviraptorids, caenagnathids, or more primitive than either group.

In 2020, during their description of Oksoko, the cladogram recovered by Funston et al. is shown below. Because Oviraptor did not clade with Citipati and the other "oviraptorines", they named the latter's clade Citipatiinae, although they did not provide a formal definition. However, according to Mickey Mortimer, the clade can be considered valid because its describers explicitly name it as new, which satisfies ICZN Article 16.1.

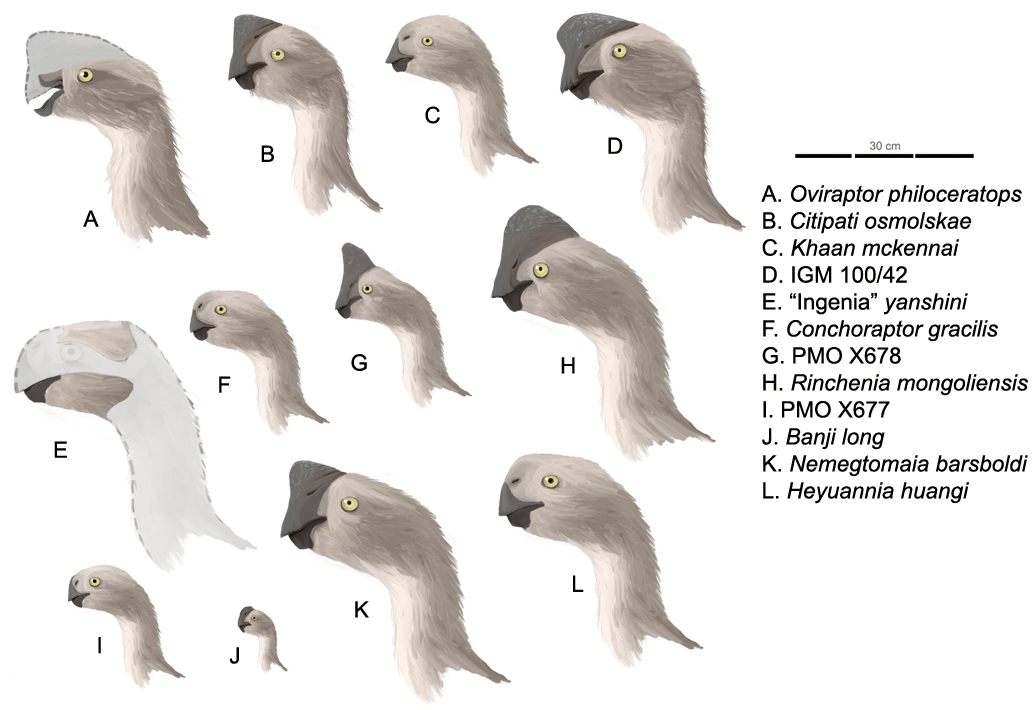
Oviraptorid profiles

- Oviraptoridae
  - Nankangia
  - - Oviraptor
    - - Yulong
      - - Citipatiinae
          - Wulatelong
          - - - Rinchenia
              - Tongtianlong
            - - Ganzhousaurus
              - - - Citipati
                  - Zamyn Khondt oviraptorid
                - - Huanansaurus
                  - Corythoraptor
        - Heyuanninae
          - Shixinggia
          - - Khaan
            - - Conchoraptor
              - - Machairasaurus
                - - - Nemegtomaia
                    - - Heyuannia huangi
                      - Heyuannia yanshini
                  - - - Banji
                      - - Jiangxisaurus
                        - Oksoko

== Paleobiology ==
=== Diet ===
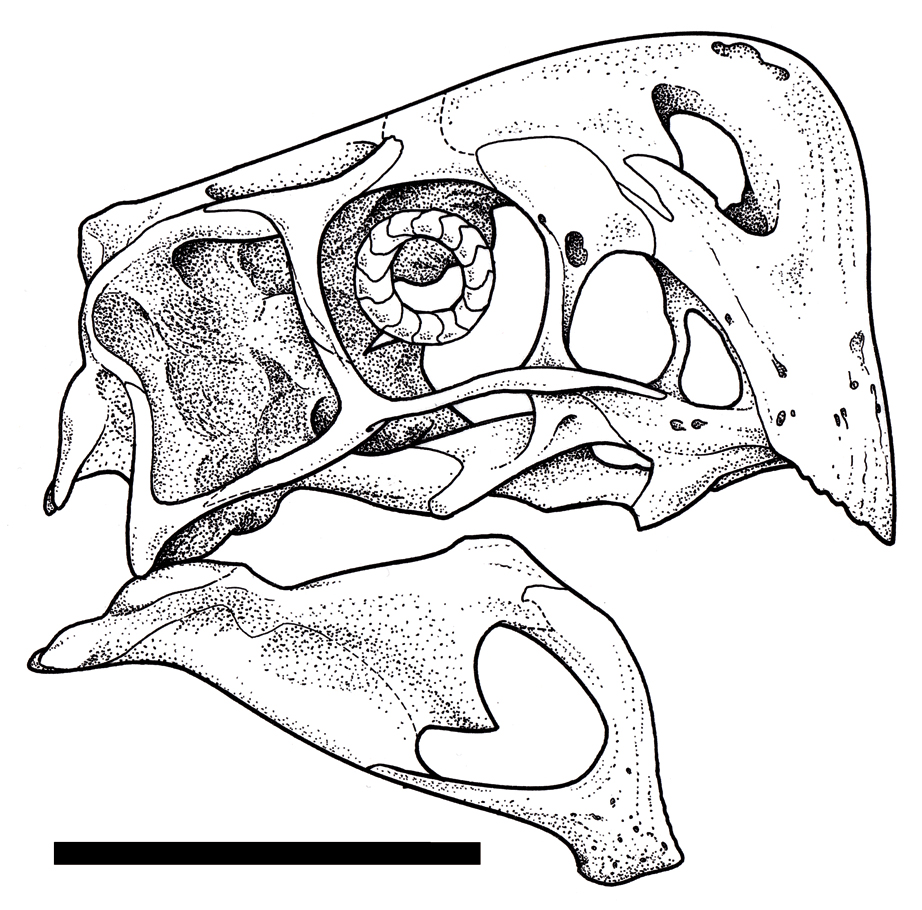
Skull of Nemegtomaia, featuring deep lower jaws and a large palatal region

The diet of oviraptorids is not fully understood. Though some appear to have been at least partially carnivorous, they were probably primarily herbivorous or omnivorous.

Originally, oviraptorids were thought to be specialized egg raiders, based on a Mongolian find showing Oviraptor on top of a nest erroneously attributed to the ceratopsian dinosaur Protoceratops. However, discoveries in the 1990s, including Citipati specimens clearly brooding (rather than preying on) the same types of nests, and a Citipati embryo inside the same type of egg preserved in these nests, showed that the "specialized egg thief" idea was incorrect. Still, some scientists have suggested that oviraptorids may have fed on shelled food items like eggs or shellfish. However, animals specialized for eating shelled food typically have broad, crushing beaks or teeth. In contrast, the jaws of oviraptorids had thin, sharp edges probably supporting shearing beaks, ill-suited for cracking shells. Among other known animals, the beaks of oviraptorids most closely resemble those of herbivorous dicynodont synapsids, which are usually considered herbivorous. Their beaks also share similarities with the beaks of herbivorous parrots and tortoises.

Evidence of partial carnivory among some oviraptorines comes from a lizard skeleton preserved in the body cavity of the type specimen of Oviraptor and two hatchling Byronosaurus skulls found in a Citipati nest. Some scientists have also suggested that some oviraptorids (especially the small-handed, weak-clawed "ingeniines") fed mainly on plant material. Gastroliths have been preserved in the abdominal region of an oviraptorid specimen from the Nanxiong Formation.

=== Reproduction ===
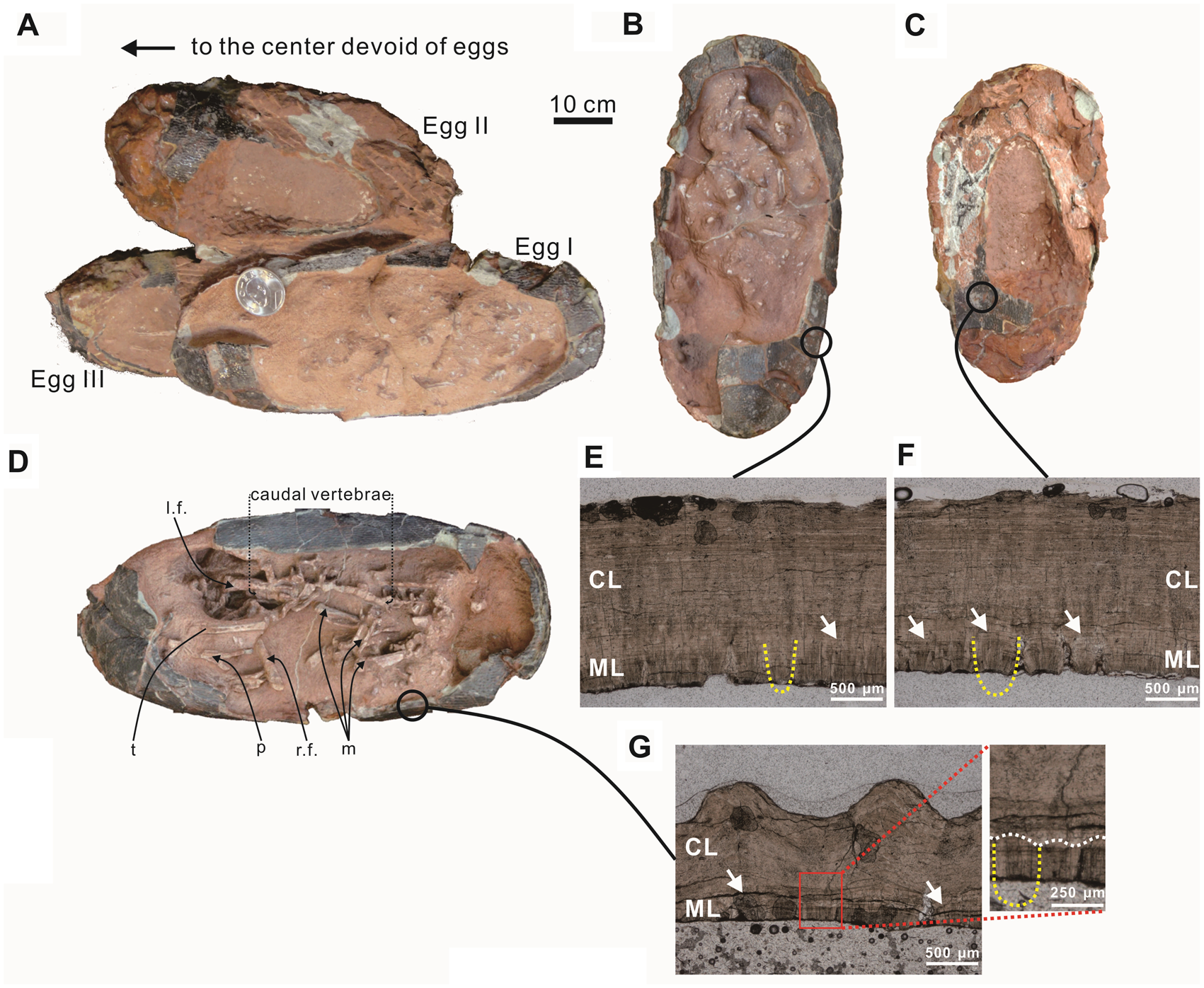
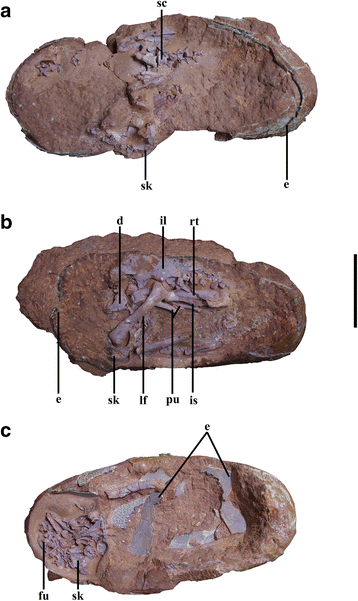
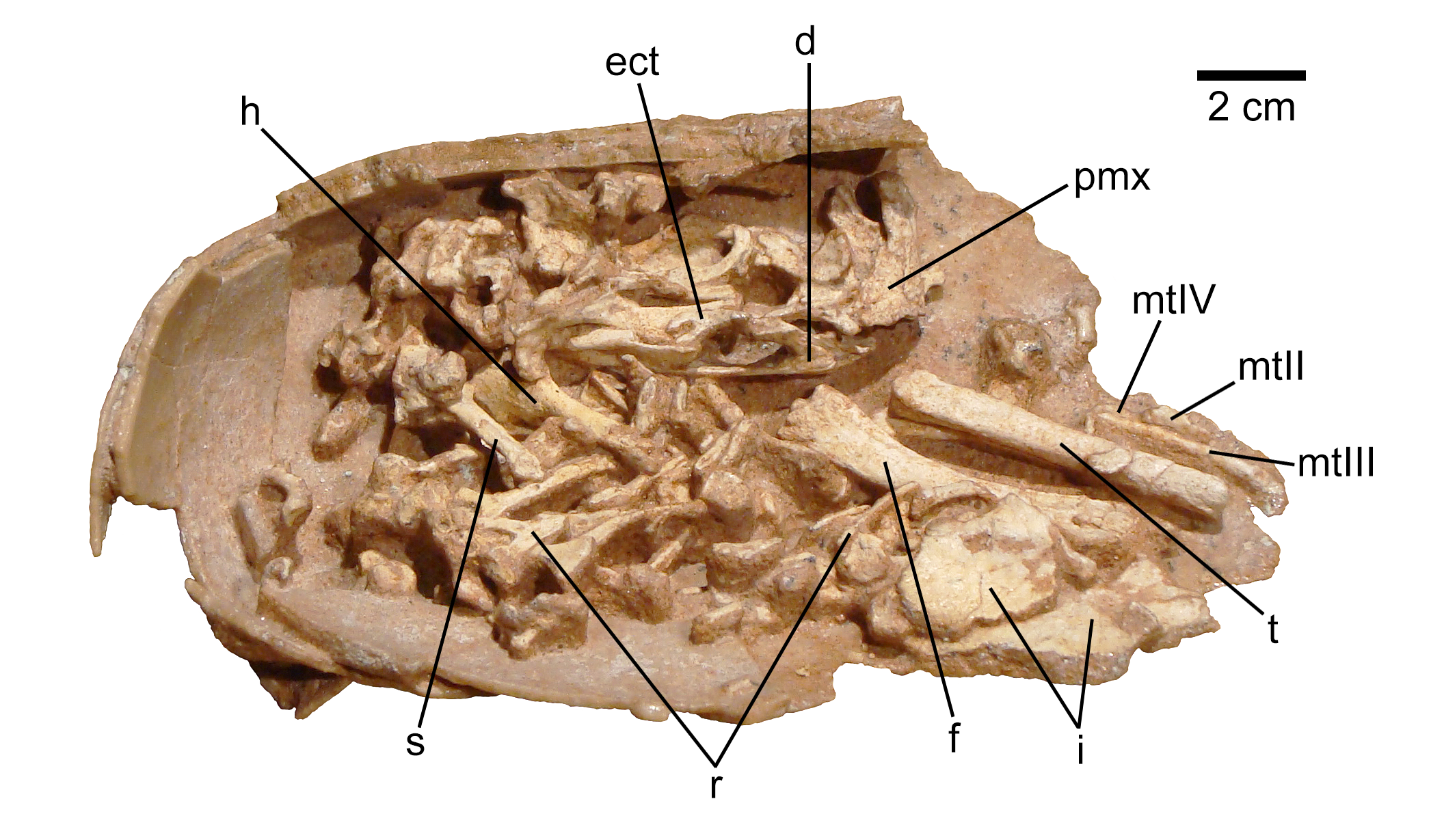
Collection of several embryo-bearing eggs of oviraptorids

Although fossilized dinosaur eggs are generally rare, oviraptorid eggs are relatively well known. Several oviraptorid nests, eggs, and embryos are known, mostly uncovered in the Gobi Desert. Some specimens of Oviraptor philoceratops, Citipati osmolskae, Nemegtomaia and cf. Machairasaurus have been found in brooding positions in association with nests. All of the nesting specimens are situated on top of egg clutches, with their limbs spread symmetrically on each side of the nest, front limbs covering the nest perimeter. This brooding posture is found today only in birds and supports a behavioral link between birds and theropod dinosaurs.

Oviraptorid eggs are shaped like elongated ovals (elongatoolithid) and resemble the eggs of ratite birds (such as ostriches) in texture and shell structure. In the nest, eggs are typically found in pairs and arranged in concentric circles of up to three layers, with complete clutches consisting of as many of 22 eggs in some species. The eggs of Citipati are the largest known definitive oviraptorid eggs, at 18 cm. In contrast, eggs associated with Oviraptor are only up to 14 cm long.

The first oviraptorid eggs (of the genus Oviraptor, which mean "Egg thief") were found in close proximity to the remains of the ceratopsian dinosaur Protoceratops and it was assumed that the oviraptorids were preying upon the eggs of the ceratopsians. It was not until 1993, when a Citipati embryo was discovered inside an egg of the type assigned to Protoceratops, that the error was corrected. Norell et al., who recognized the embryo as oviraptorid, assigned it to the genus Citipati. The egg containing the embryo was smaller than most known Citipati eggs at only 12 cm, though it was partially eroded and broken into three pieces, making an accurate estimate of its original size difficult. The embryo-bearing egg was otherwise identical to other oviraptorid eggs in shell structure and was found in an isolated nest, again arranged in a circular pattern.

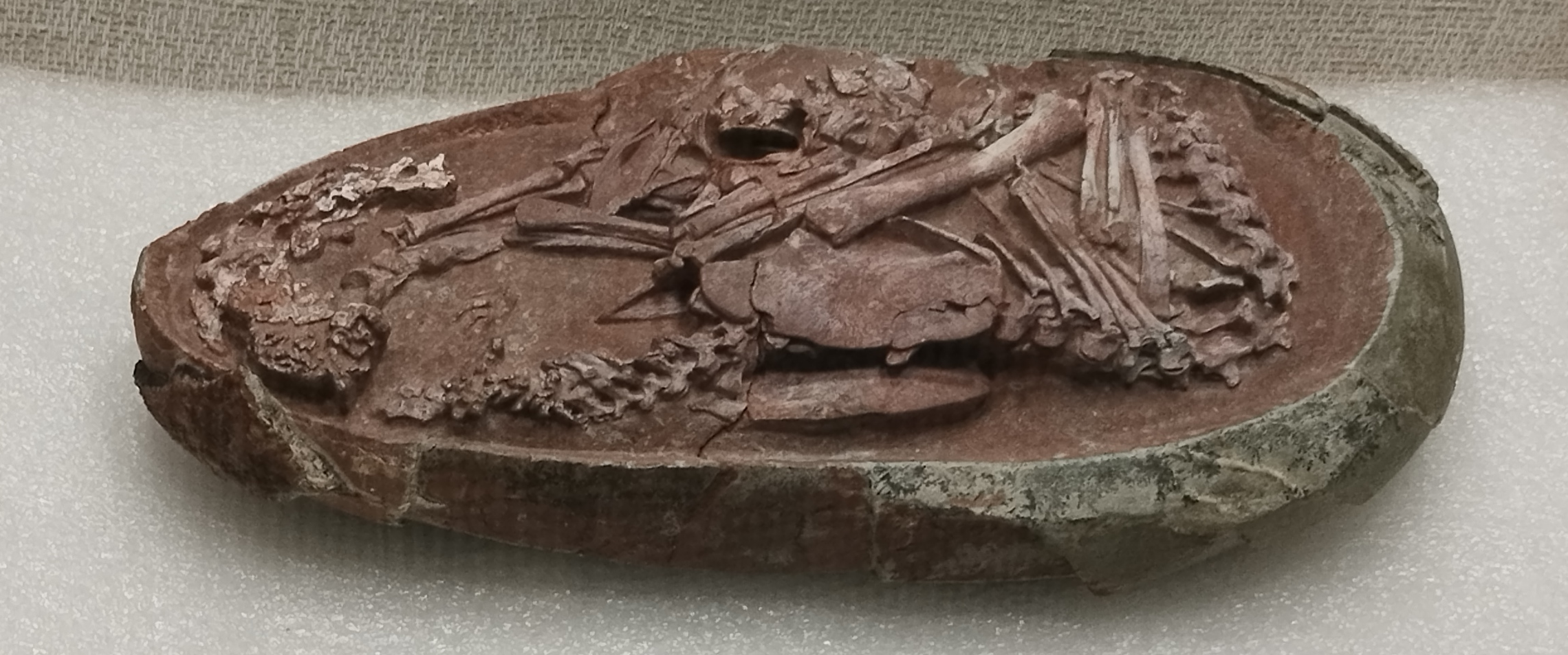
Oviraptorid egg "Baby Yingliang"

Baby Yingliang (Catalog: YLSNHM01266, Chinese: 英良贝贝) is a well preserved fossil of a dinosaur embryo discovered in the year 2000 in Ganzhou. It was found in rock layers of the Hekou Formation, which dates to the Late Cretaceous. The specimen has been described as one of the best dinosaur embryos ever found. It represents a late-stage embryo preserved in a position similar to those of extant birds, and is the first example of this to be found in a non-avian dinosaur. In birds, this behavior is known as "tucking", and is controlled by the central nervous system. This posture places the head below the body with the feet on either side of the head and the back curled, which aids in successful hatching. However, this interpretation of the specimen has been challenged, with some scientists suggesting that it cannot be directly compared to extant birds. The skeleton of Baby Yingliang is approximately 23.5 cm (9.3 in) from head to tail, and is preserved within the confines of a 16.7 by 7.6 cm (6.6 by 3.0 in) egg. The skeleton occupies most of the egg's internal space other than a 1.9 cm (0.75 in) space between the dorsal vertebrae and the blunt pole of the egg. This hollow is thought to be the remains of the egg's air cell, though this inference is unproven.

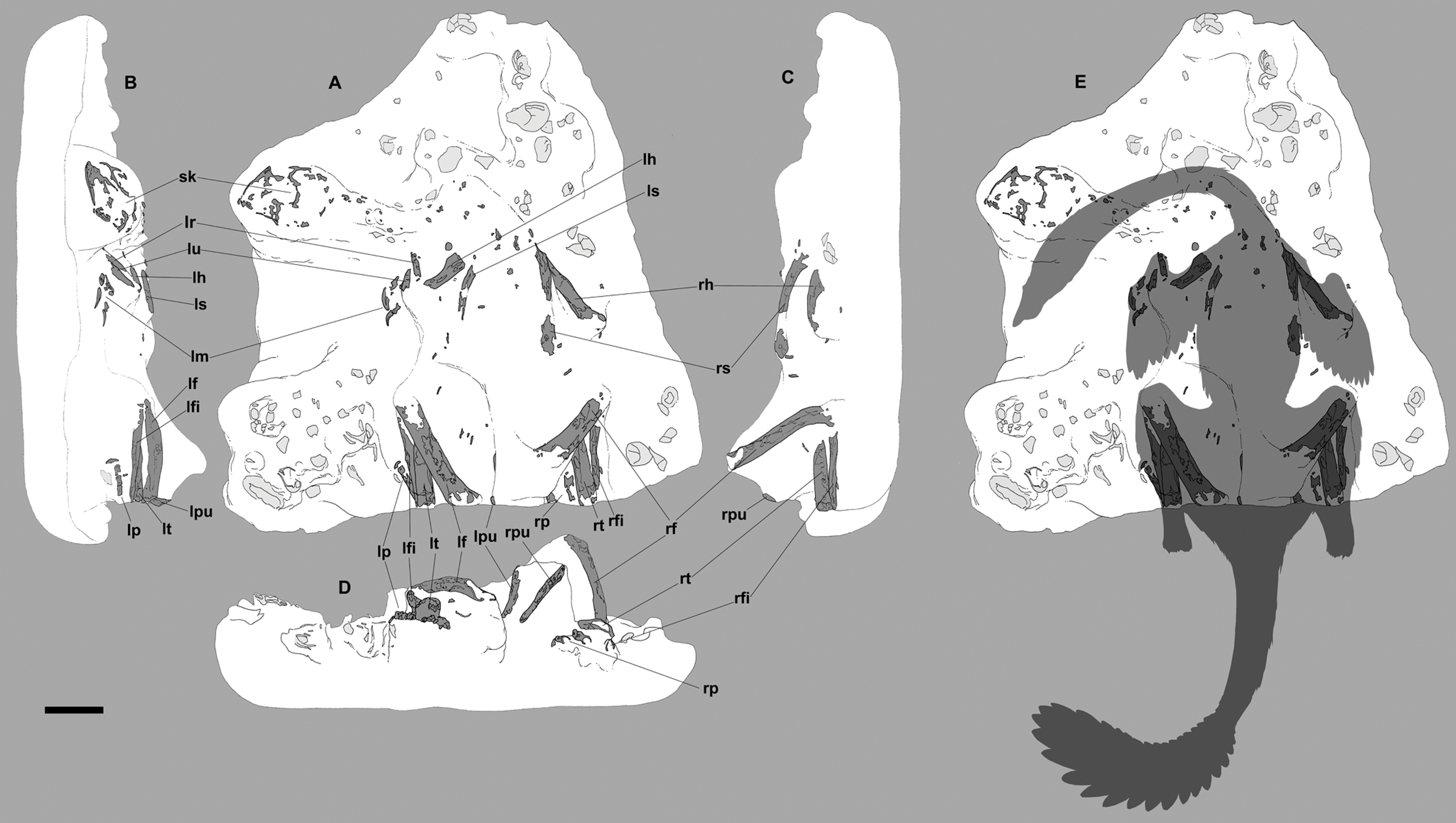
Nesting Nemegtomaia specimen MPC-D 107/15

An oviraptorosaurian specimen from China described in 2005 was found to have two unlaid eggs within the pelvic canal. This suggests that, unlike modern crocodilians, oviraptorosaurs did not produce and lay many eggs at the same time. Rather, the eggs were produced within the reproductive organs in pairs, and laid two at a time, with the mother positioned in the center of the nest and rotating in a circle as each pair was laid. This behavior is supported by the fact that the eggs oval shape, with the more narrow end pointing backward from the birth canal, matching their orientation toward the center of the nest after being laid.

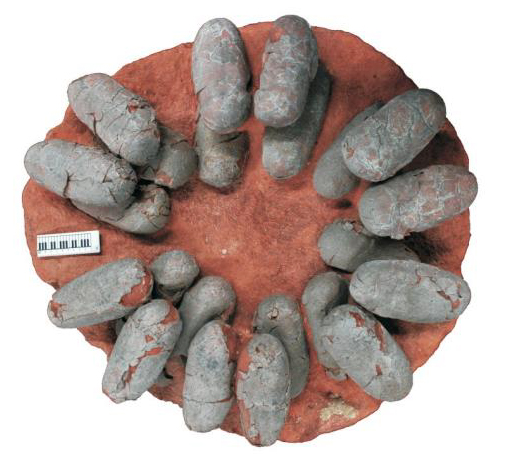
Oviraptorid nest/egg clutch (specimen PFMM 0010403018)

The presence of two shelled eggs within the birth canal shows that oviraptorosaurs were intermediate between the reproductive biology of crocodilians and modern birds. Like crocodilians, they had two oviducts. However, crocodilians produce multiple shelled eggs per oviduct at a time, whereas oviraptorosaurs, like birds, produced only one egg per oviduct at a time.

In 2017, paleontologists discovered colored pigments in some fossilized oviraptorid embryos of the egg-shell genus Macroolithus (which may represent eggs of Heyuannia). Examinations of eggs attributed to Heyuannia by Jasmina Wiemann and Tzu-Ruei Yang et al revealed the eggs preserved the blue-green pigment biliverdin and the reddish-brown pigment protoporphyrin, the same pigments found in many modern birds' eggshells. The eggs are thought to have been a blue-green color, because biliverdin is preserved in much greater abundance the photoporphyrin. In modern bird eggs, coloration can camouflage the eggs or help parents identify eggs, and it is correlated with more intensive parental care.

=== Metabolism ===
A study by Robert Eagle et al. of the University of California-Los Angeles indicates that from specimens of eggs found in Mongolia and examination of the isotopes carbon-13 and oxygen 18 found within, Oviraptorids had body temperatures that could be elevated higher than that of the surrounding environment but lower than that of birds. This is very different from the isotope ratios of sauropod dinosaurs like Brachiosaurus, which had body temperatures of up to 100 °F (38 °C) and were fully endothermic.

=== Feathers ===
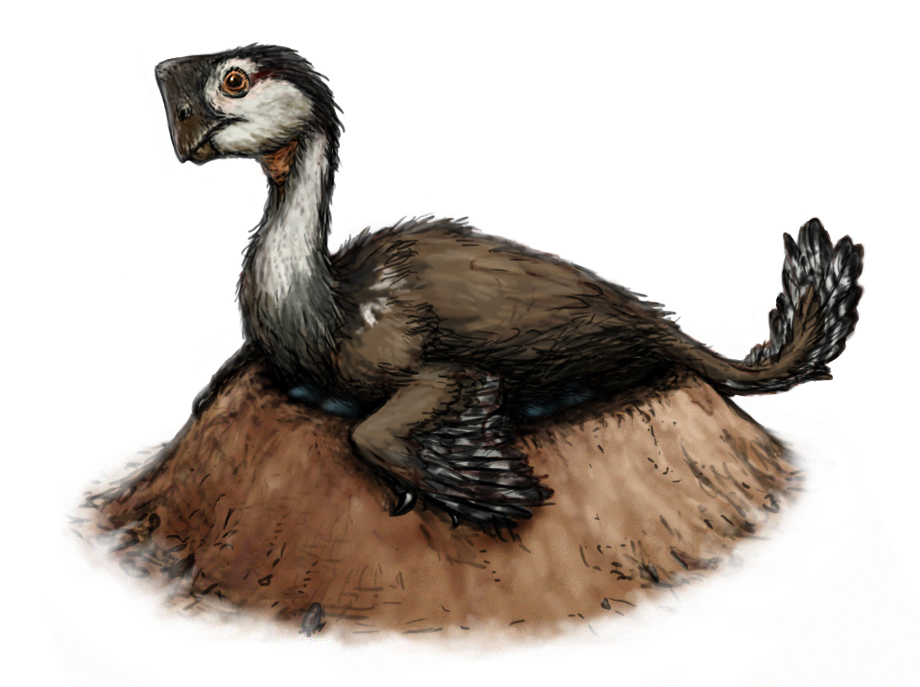
Paleoart depiction of a nesting Nemegtomaia, featuring feathers used to incubate eggs

Oviraptorids were probably feathered, since some close relatives were found with feathers preserved (including species of Caudipteryx, Protarchaeopteryx and Similicaudipteryx). Another finding pointing to this is the discovery in Nomingia of a pygostyle, a bone that results from the fusion of the last tail vertebrae and is responsible in birds to hold a fan of feathers in the tail. Finally, the arm position of the brooding Citipati would have been far more effective if feathers were present to cover the eggs.

=== Pathology ===
The brooding oviraptorid specimen IGM 100/979 showed a callus and possible longitudinal groove left over from a healed fracture of the right ulna. Other oviraptorids have had pathological features reported in their phalanges but these have not been described in detail in the scientific literature.

== Paleoenvironment ==
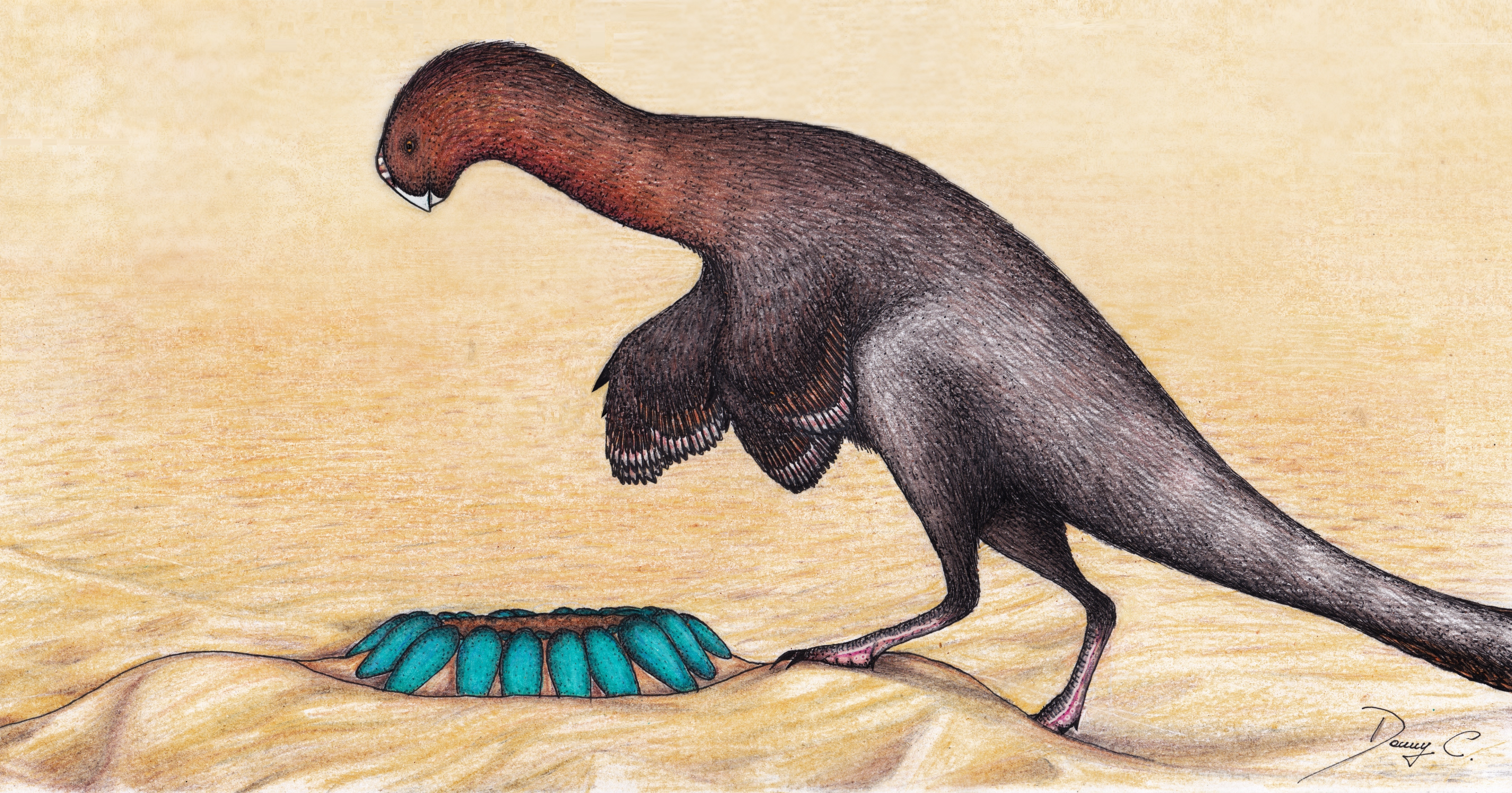
Heyuannia restoration with nest

Almost all oviraptorids come from desert deposits of the Gobi Desert. Even in the late Cretaceous period, much of this area was desert, or at least very dry, habitat. In many of the localities where they are found, oviraptorids are among the most abundant dinosaurs present, second only to ankylosaurs and protoceratopsids. This is consistent with the idea that they were primarily herbivores, which tend to far outnumber carnivores in a given environment. Oviraptorids appear to have been far more abundant in arid habitats dominated mainly by small dinosaurs (such as those preserved in the Barun Goyot and Djadochta Formations) than in wetter ecosystems where large dinosaurs are common (such as the Nemegt Formation). The same pattern holds true for protoceratopsids, indicating that both groups preferred dry, desert-like habitat, and fed mainly on the types of tough, low-growing plant life that grows in arid climates.

== See also ==
- Timeline of oviraptorosaur research
