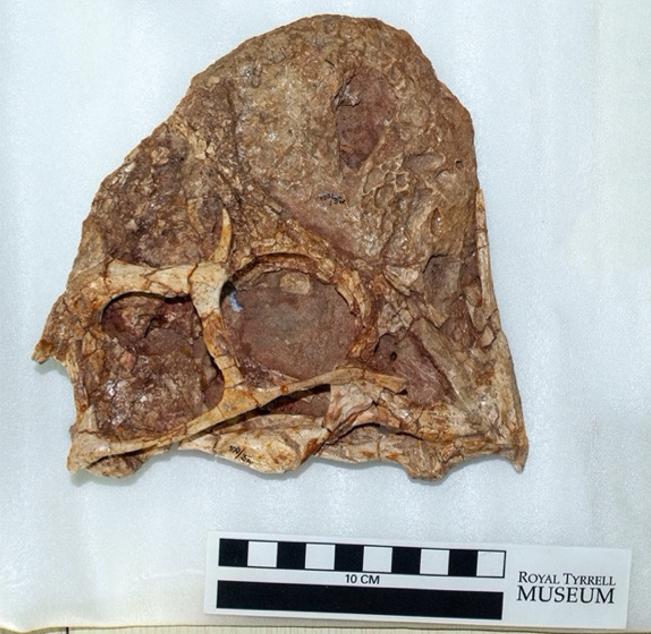
- Skull of the holotype

Scientific classification
- Kingdom: Animalia
- Phylum: Chordata
- Class: Reptilia
- Clade: Dinosauria
- Clade: Saurischia
- Clade: Theropoda
- Family: †Oviraptoridae
- Genus: †Rinchenia; Barsbold, 1997

Type species
- †Rinchenia mongoliensis (Barsbold, 1986)

Synonyms
- Oviraptor mongoliensis Barsbold, 1986

= Rinchenia =

Rinchenia Temporal range: Late Cretaceous, Maastrichtian

Extinct genus of oviraptorosaurian dinosaurs

Rinchenia (named after Byambyn Rinchen) is a genus of oviraptorid dinosaur that lived in Asia during the Late Cretaceous epoch in what is now Mongolia, Nemegt Formation. The type and only known species, Rinchenia mongoliensis, was originally classified as a species within the genus Oviraptor (named Oviraptor mongoliensis), but a subsequent reexamination found differences significant enough to warrant a separate genus. The name Rinchenia was coined for this new genus, though not formally described in detail.

== History of discovery ==
During 1984, a nearly complete oviraptorid skeleton was discovered at the Altan Uul II (or Altan Ula II) locality of the highly fossiliferous Nemegt Formation, Gobi Desert. This newly collected specimen, MPC-D 100/32-A, included the skull and lower jaws in their entirety, nearly complete vertebral column, forelimbs with shoulder girdle, and partial hindlimbs with pelvic girdle. Later on, Mongolian paleontologist Rinchen Barsbold in 1986 used the specimen to erect and describe a new species of Oviraptor: Oviraptor mongoliensis. Barsbold in 1997 assigned a new genus for the specimen, namely Rinchenia. Although concluding that it was distinctly different from Oviraptor in both skull and skeleton characters, Barsbold did not include a formal diagnosis for this new taxon. Halszka Osmólska with colleagues in 2004 during their large revision of several dinosaur clades preferred the combination R. mongoliensis over the previously named O. mongoliensis, also regarding the latter as a synonym.

In 2018, Gregory F. Funston and team conducted a comprehensive revision of the at-the-time known oviraptorosaur taxa across the Barun Goyot Formation and Nemegt Formation, where they formally described, photographed, and diagnosed Rinchenia based on the assigned holotype MPC-D 100/32-A. The team also stated that even though the locality of the holotype is known, the exact site of discovery and horizon remains unknown. Funston in his 2019 master thesis described in extensive detail the holotype of Rinchenia, along with other oviraptorids, where he provided additional data regarding the name of the taxon. The generic name, Rinchenia, is in honor of Byambyn Rinchen, veteran linguist and father of Barsbold. The specific name, mongoliensis, refers to the country where the holotype was found: Mongolia.

== Description ==
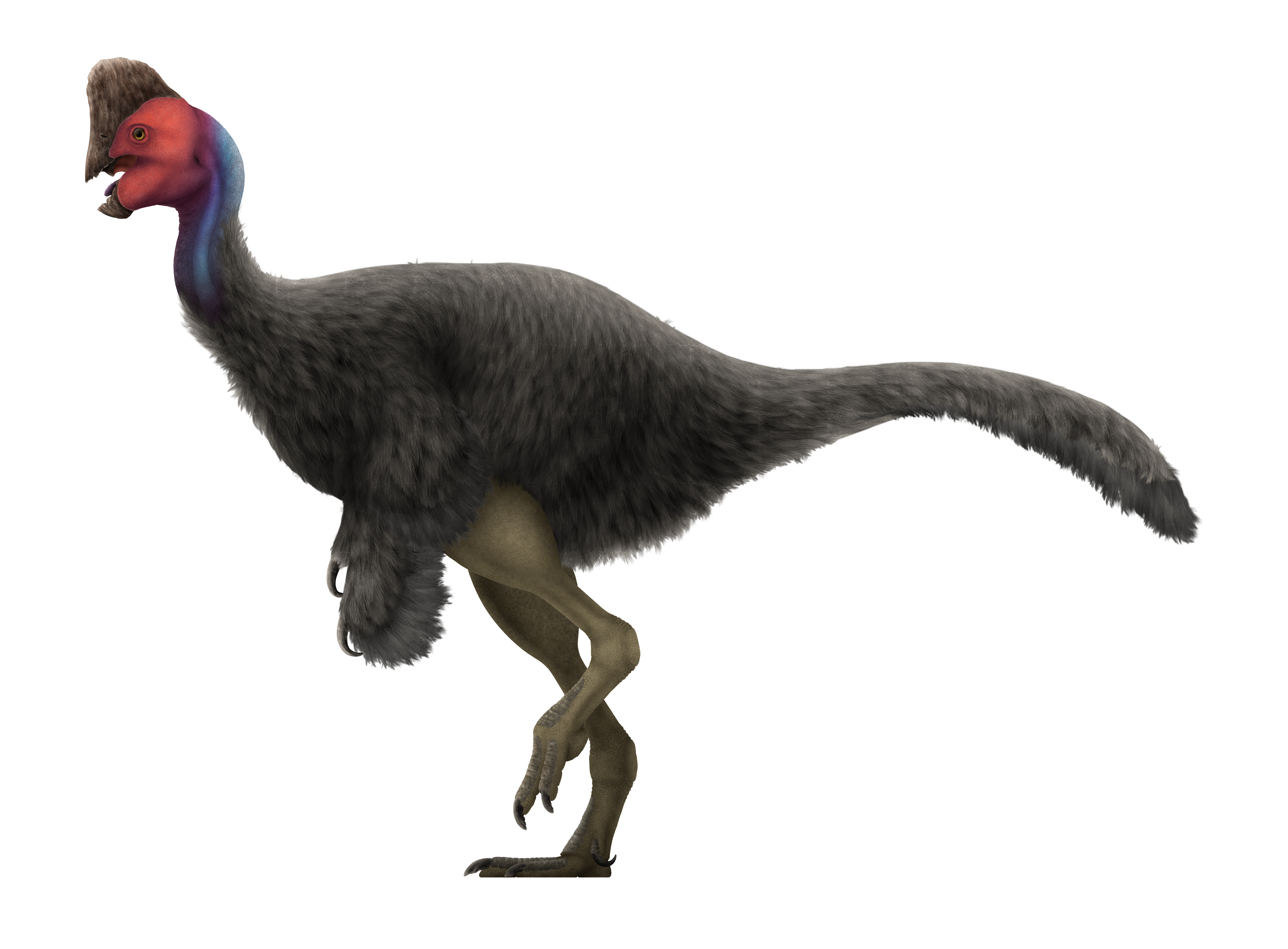
Life restoration

Rinchenia was a small-sized oviraptorid, estimated at 1.7 m (5.6 ft) and a body mass of about 25 kg (55 lb). Several features of its skeleton, especially in the skull, show it to be distinct from Oviraptor. Its skeleton was more lightly built and less robust than that of Oviraptor, and while the crest of Oviraptor is indistinct because of poor fossil preservation, Rinchenia had a well-preserved, highly developed, cassowary-like casque/dome which incorporated many bones in the skull that are free of the crest in Oviraptor.

== See also ==
- Timeline of oviraptorosaur research
