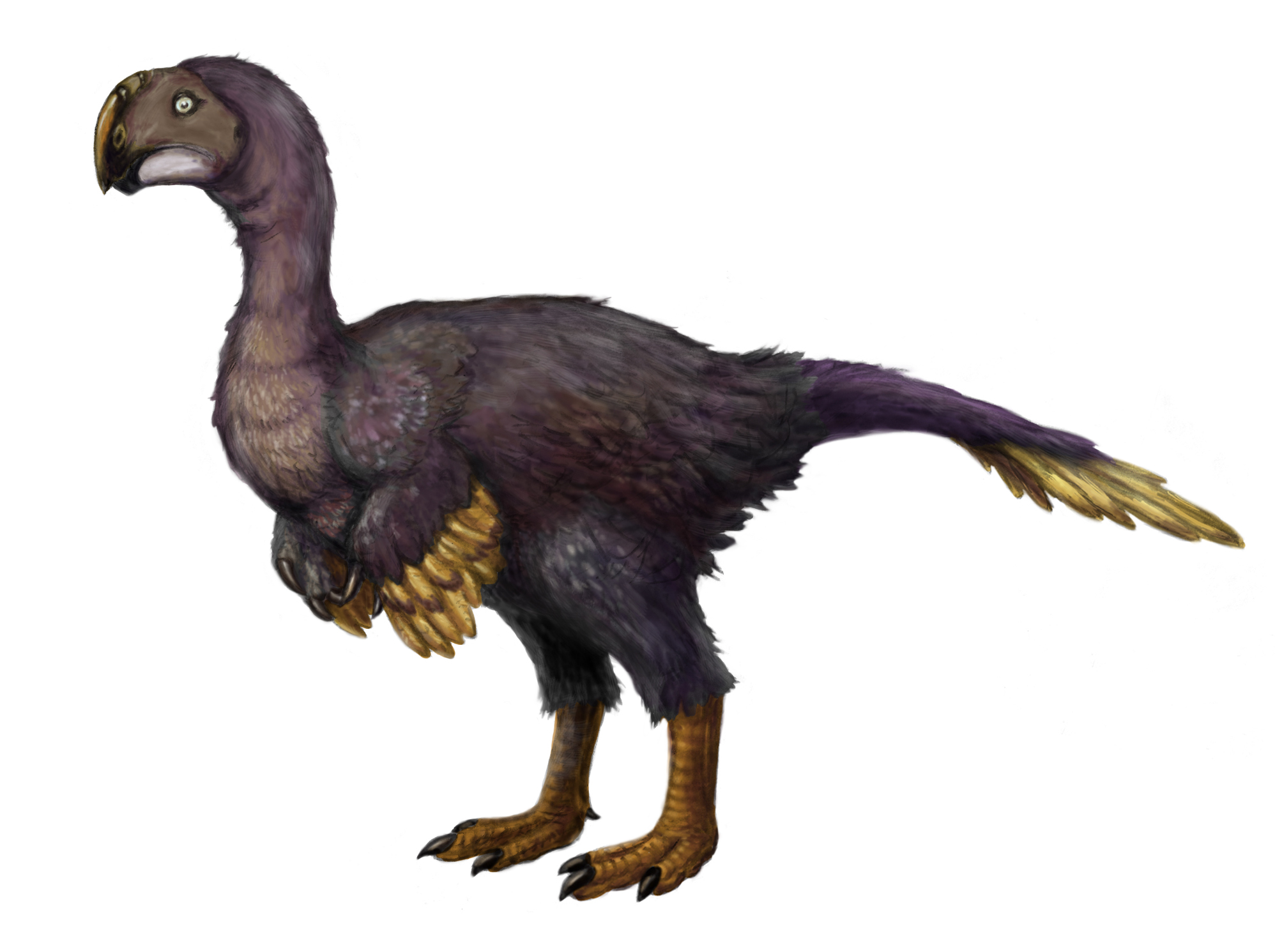
- Restoration

Scientific classification
- Kingdom: Animalia
- Phylum: Chordata
- Class: Reptilia
- Clade: Dinosauria
- Clade: Saurischia
- Clade: Theropoda
- Family: †Oviraptoridae
- Subfamily: †Heyuanninae
- Genus: †Ganzhousaurus; Wang et al., 2013

Type species
- †Ganzhousaurus nankangensis Wang et al., 2013

= Ganzhousaurus =

Ganzhousaurus Temporal range: Late Cretaceous, 72–66 Ma

Extinct genus of dinosaurs

Ganzhousaurus (meaning "Ganzhou lizard") is an extinct genus of oviraptorid dinosaur known from the Late Cretaceous Nanxiong Formation of Nankang County, Ganzhou City of Jiangxi Province, southern China. It was found in a Maastrichtian deposit and contains a single species, Ganzhousaurus nankangensis. It is distinguished by a combination of primitive and derived features.

== Phylogeny ==
Phylogenetic analysis places Ganzhousaurus within Oviraptoridae. Within Oviraptoridae its phylogenetic position is more unstable, with one phylogenetic analysis recovering it as a member of the Oviraptorinae and another recovering it as a more derived member of the group, closely related to "ingeniines" However, it also bears some similarities to the basal caenagnathid Gigantoraptor.

== Paleobiology ==
Ganzhousaurus shared its habitat with at least four other oviraptorid species, Jiangxisaurus ganzhouensis, Nankangia jiangxiensis, Banji long, and an as-yet unnamed species. This diversity may have been made possible by niche partitioning, with Ganzhousaurus being primarily herbivorous.

== See also ==
- Timeline of oviraptorosaur research
