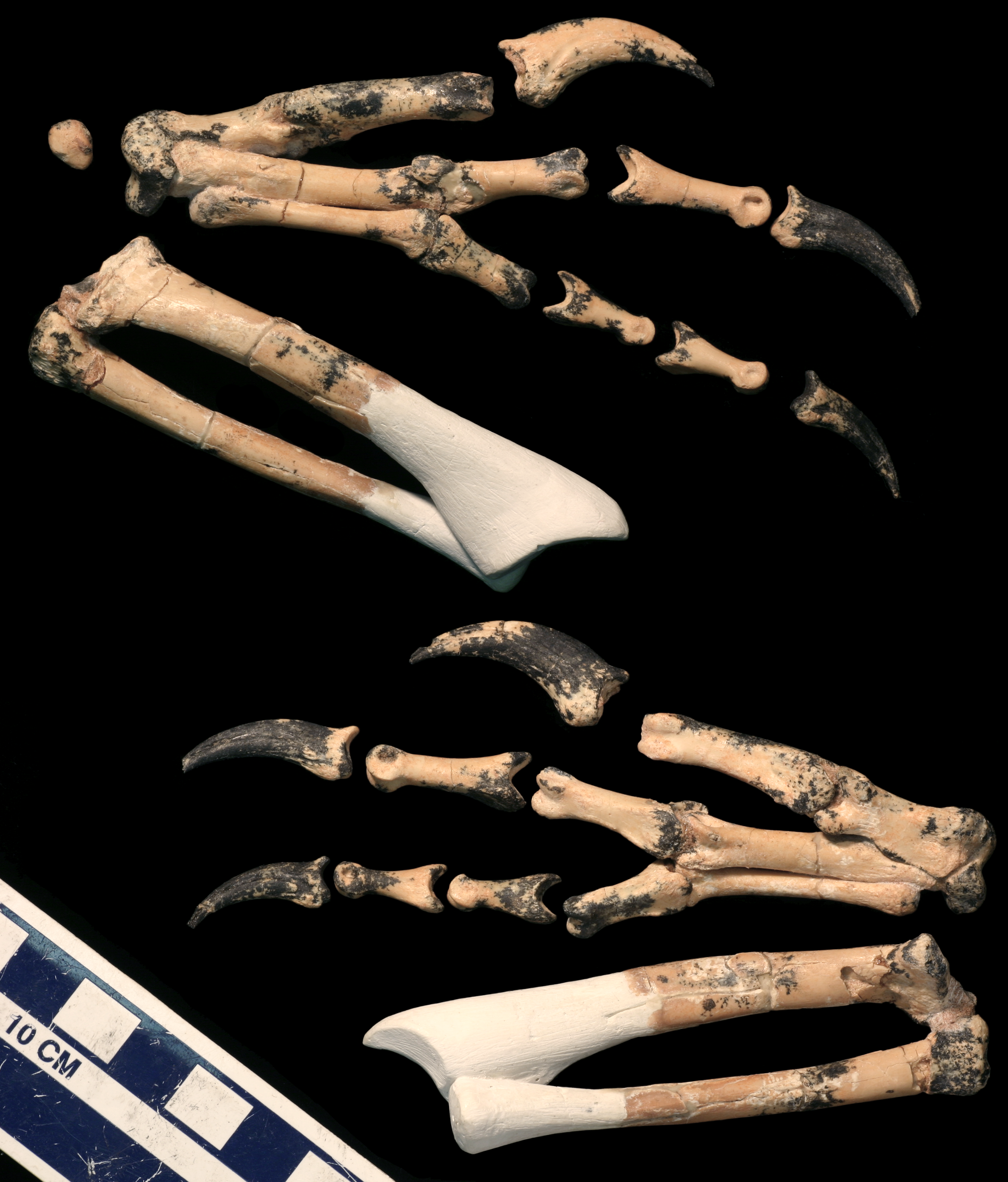
- Forearm and hand in dorsal (top) and ventral (bottom) views, showing the elongate claws

Scientific classification
- Kingdom: Animalia
- Phylum: Chordata
- Class: Reptilia
- Clade: Dinosauria
- Clade: Saurischia
- Clade: Theropoda
- Family: †Oviraptoridae
- Subfamily: †Heyuanninae
- Genus: †Machairasaurus; Longrich, Currie & Dong, 2010
- Species: †M. leptonychus

Binomial name
- †Machairasaurus leptonychus Longrich, Currie & Dong, 2010

= Machairasaurus =

Machairasaurus Temporal range: Campanian, 75–71 Ma

Extinct genus of dinosaurs

Machairasaurus is a genus of oviraptorid dinosaur which was found in the Upper Cretaceous Bayan Mandahu Formation, China.

== Discovery ==
During the Sino-Canadian expeditions of 1988 and 1990 some skeletons of unknown oviraptorosaurians were discovered by Philip J. Currie in Inner Mongolia. Based on two of these a new genus was named and described by Nicholas Longrich, Philip Currie, and Dong Zhiming in 2010 with the type species Machairasaurus leptonychus. The generic name is derived from Greek μάχαιρα (makhaira), "short scimitar". The specific name is derived from Greek λεπτός (leptos), "slender", and ὄνυξ (onyx), "claw". The species name as a whole refers to the sabre-like claws of the hand.

The holotype, IVPP V15979, was found in layers of the Bayan Mandahu dating from the late Campanian. It mainly consists of a left front limb, including the lower end of the lower arm, two carpal bones, and a complete hand.Some fragmentary foot elements are also known. The other find is the paratype, IVPP V15980, consisting of a very fragmentary skeleton including tail vertebrae, chevrons, ribs, phalanges of the hands, fragments of the second and fourth metatarsals, and pedal phalanges.

Five oviraptorid specimens associated with a nest, the female having been found brooding near the eggs, may belong to Machairasaurus.

== Description ==
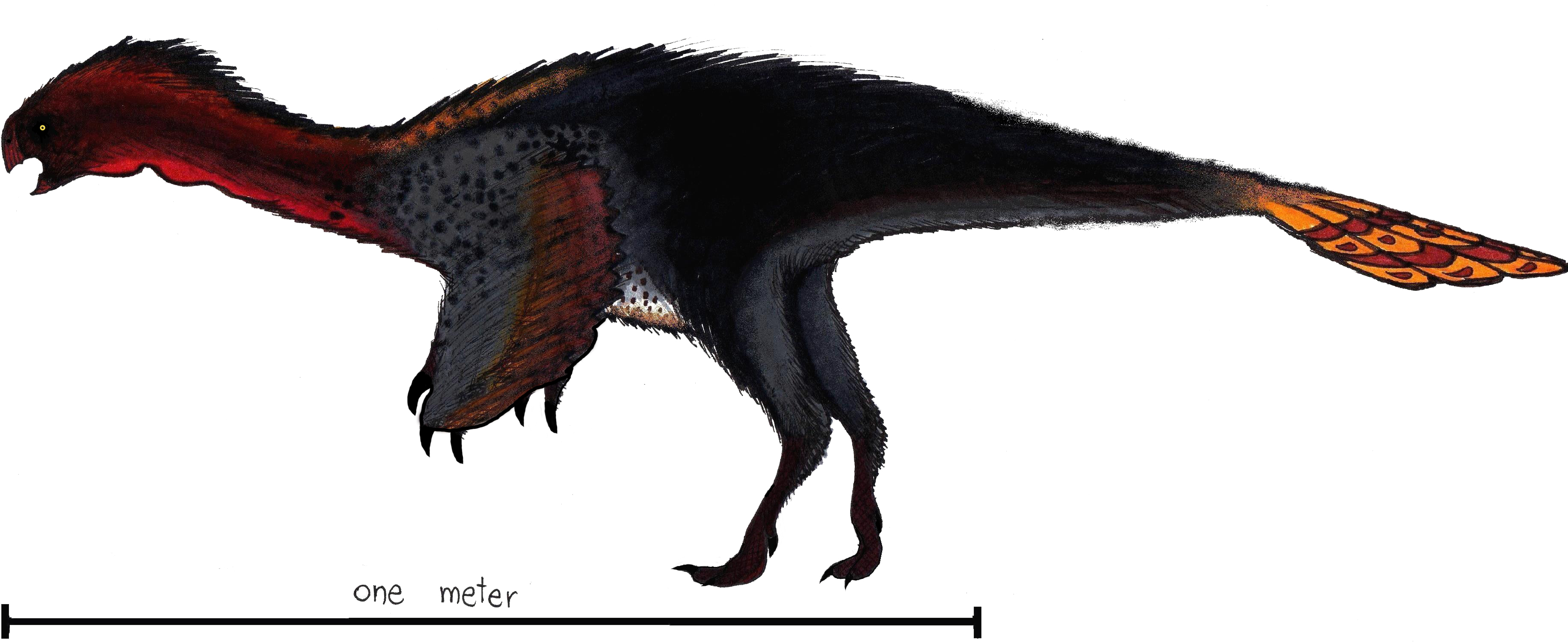
Life restoration

Machairasaurus was a small bipedal theropod, measuring around 1.5 m (4.9 ft) long. The describers established a single autapomorphy, unique derived trait: the hand claws are very elongated and blade-like in side view, with a length four times that of the joint height. The long claws would be proof that basal oviraptorids used their hands to pull down branches; the more curved claws of more derived forms would have served to dig up roots.

In 2010, Machairasaurus was assigned to the Oviraptoridae, more precisely to the Ingeniinae. It formed a smaller clade with Heyuannia spp., Conchoraptor, and Nemegtomaia.

== See also ==
- Timeline of oviraptorosaur research
