= Shixinggia =

Shixinggia Temporal range: Late Cretaceous, 70 Ma

Scientific classification
- Kingdom: Animalia
- Phylum: Chordata
- Class: Reptilia
- Clade: Dinosauria
- Clade: Saurischia
- Clade: Theropoda
- Family: †Oviraptoridae
- Genus: †Shixinggia; Lü & Zhang, 2005
- Species: †S. oblita

Binomial name
- †Shixinggia oblita Lü & Zhang, 2005

Extinct genus of dinosaurs

Shixinggia is a genus of oviraptorosaurian dinosaur from the Late Cretaceous period of Shixing County, Guangdong, China, for which it was named. While no skull was recovered, the specimen (BVP-112) is known from a fair amount of post-cranial material that shows it was a fairly derived oviraptorosaur (slightly more advanced than Nomingia), of superfamily Caenagnathoidea. Lü et al. (2003, 2005) describe it as an oviraptorid, but it could be a caenagnathid .

== See also ==
- Timeline of oviraptorosaur research
