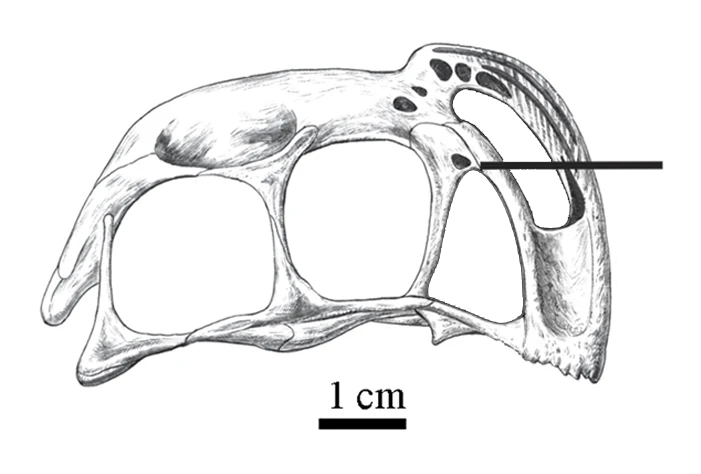
- Skull from the holotype specimen

Scientific classification
- Kingdom: Animalia
- Phylum: Chordata
- Class: Reptilia
- Clade: Dinosauria
- Clade: Saurischia
- Clade: Theropoda
- Family: †Oviraptoridae
- Genus: †Banji; Xu & Han, 2010
- Species: †B. long

Binomial name
- †Banji long Xu & Han, 2010

= Banji =

Banji Temporal range: Late Cretaceous, 66.7 Ma

Extinct genus of dinosaurs

Banji is an extinct genus of oviraptorid dinosaur that lived approximately 66 million years ago during the later part of the Cretaceous Period in what is now China. It was a small, lightly built, ground-dwelling, bipedal carnivore, that was an estimated 65 cm (2.1 ft) long, as a juvenile.

== Discovery and naming ==
The holotype specimen, IVPP V 16896, consists of a single nearly complete skull and lower jaw. It was donated to the Chinese Institute of Vertebrate Paleontology and Paleoanthropology by an amateur collector who recovered the fossil near the city of Ganzhou, in Jiangxi Province. Examination of the rock encasing the skull shows it is probably from the Red Beds of the Nanxiong Formation, which date to the Cretaceous–Paleogene boundary about 66 million years ago. It contains only one known species, Banji long (斑嵴 龍), named from the Chinese for "striped crest dragon". It was first described by Xu Xing and Feng-Lu Han in 2010.

== Description ==
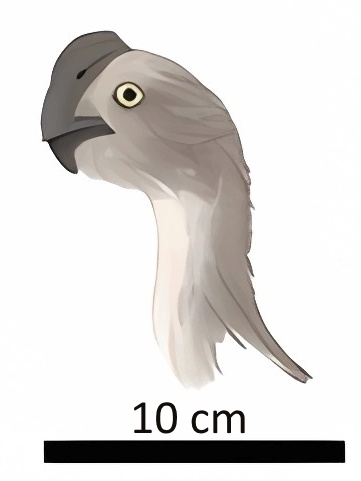
Restoration of the head

Banji possessed a tall, crested skull like some other oviraptorids. Uniquely, the sides of the crest are adorned with a series of vertical striations, as well as grooves on the top of the lower jaw. Banji also differs from other oviraptorids in having an unusually long nasal opening that followed the curve of the crest nearly to the eye socket.

=== Distinguishing anatomical features ===
According to Xu et al. (2013), Banji can be distinguished based on the following characteristics: the crest is formed by the nasal bones and the premaxillae; the crest has a step-wise caudal end and bears two longitudinal grooves and numerous oblique striations on its lateral surfaces; the presence of a caudally located, extremely elongate, external naris near the orbit; the dorsal surface of the palatal ramus of the pterygoid has a deep fossa; several longitudinal grooves are present along the caudal portion of the dorsal margin of the dentary; several tubercles are present along the lateral shelf at the dorsal margin of the surangular.

In 2024, Andrea Cau considered it likely that Banji represents an immature individual of the contemporary Corythoraptor, making it a senior synonym of that taxon. His reasoning related to shared unique characteristics of the skull, with the proposed diagnosis distinguishing the taxa being based on ontogenetically variable characters.

== See also ==
- Timeline of oviraptorosaur research
