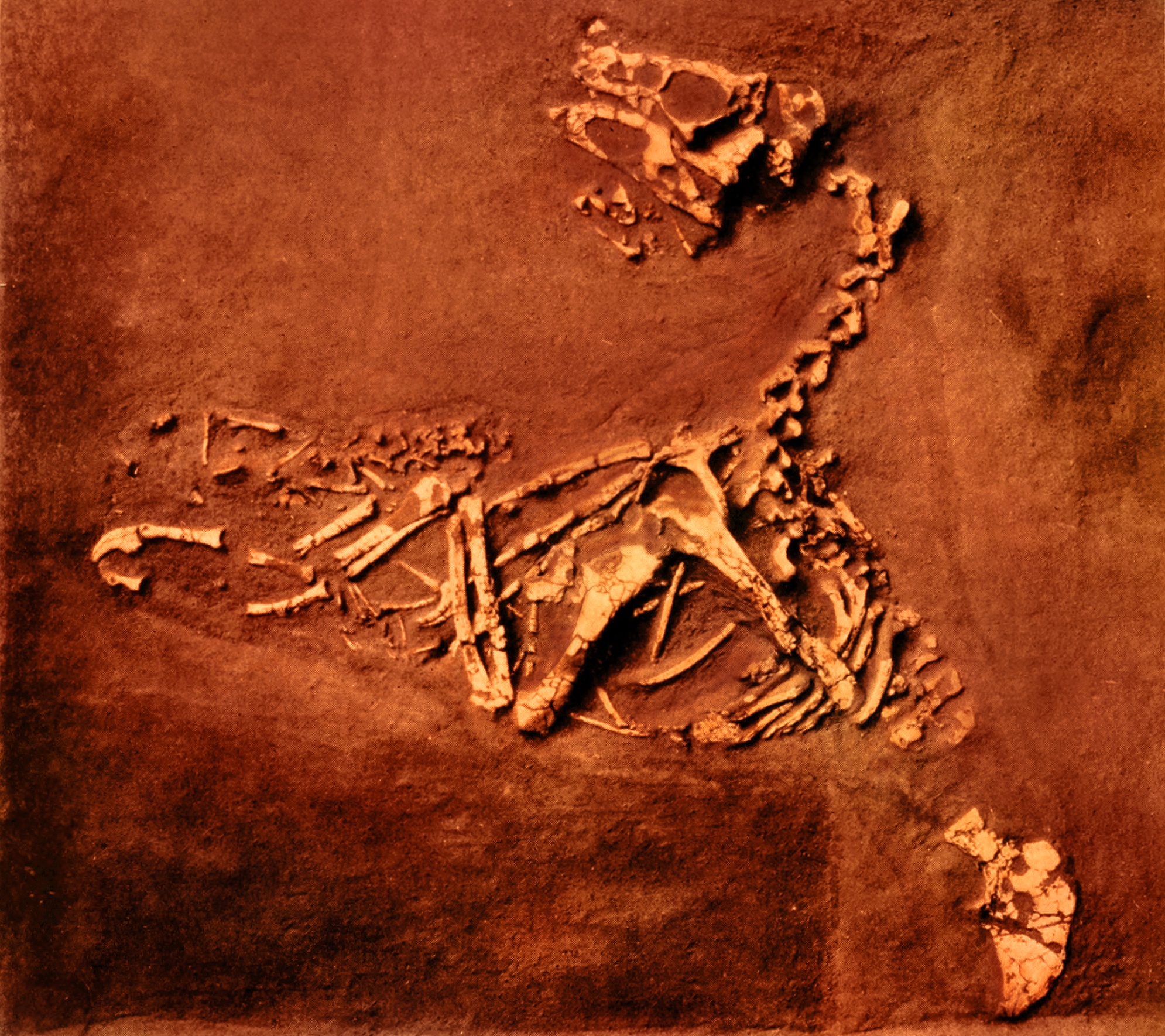
- Holotype specimen of Oviraptor

Scientific classification
- Kingdom: Animalia
- Phylum: Chordata
- Class: Reptilia
- Clade: Dinosauria
- Clade: Saurischia
- Clade: Theropoda
- Family: †Oviraptoridae
- Subfamily: †Oviraptorinae
- Genus: †Oviraptor; Osborn, 1924

Type species
- †Oviraptor philoceratops Osborn, 1924

Synonyms
- Fenestrosaurus philoceratops Osborn, 1924

= Oviraptor =

Oviraptor Temporal range: Late Cretaceous, ~75–71 Ma

Extinct genus of dinosaurs

Oviraptor (/ˈoʊvɪræptər/; lit. 'egg thief') is a genus of oviraptorid dinosaur that lived in Asia during the Late Cretaceous period. The first remains were collected from the Djadokhta Formation of Mongolia in 1923 during a paleontological expedition led by Roy Chapman Andrews, and in the following year the genus and type species Oviraptor philoceratops were named by Henry Fairfield Osborn. The genus name refers to the initial thought of egg-stealing habits, and the specific name was intended to reinforce this view indicating a preference over ceratopsian eggs. Despite the fact that numerous specimens have been referred to the genus, Oviraptor is only known from a single partial skeleton regarded as the holotype, as well as a nest of about fifteen eggs and several small fragments from a juvenile.

Oviraptor was a rather small feathered oviraptorid, estimated at 1.6–2 m (5.2–6.6 ft) long with a weight between 33–40 kg (73–88 lb). It had a wide lower jaw with a skull that likely had a crest. Both upper and lower jaws were toothless and developed a horny beak, which was used during feeding along the robust morphology of the lower jaws. The arms were well-developed and elongated ending in three fingers with curved claws. Like other oviraptorids, Oviraptor had long hindlimbs that had four-toed feet, with the first toe reduced. The tail was likely not very elongated, and ended in a pygostyle that supported large feathers.

The initial relationships of Oviraptor were poorly understood at the time and was assigned to the unrelated Ornithomimidae by the original describer, Henry Osborn. However, re-examinations made by Rinchen Barsbold proved that Oviraptor was distinct enough to warrant a separate family, the Oviraptoridae. When first described, Oviraptor was interpreted as an egg-thief, egg-eating dinosaur given the close association of the holotype with a dinosaur nest. However, findings of numerous oviraptorosaurs in nesting poses have demonstrated that this specimen was actually brooding the nest and not stealing nor feeding on the eggs. Moreover, the discovery of remains of a small juvenile or nestling have been reported in association with the holotype specimen, further supporting parental care.

== History of discovery ==
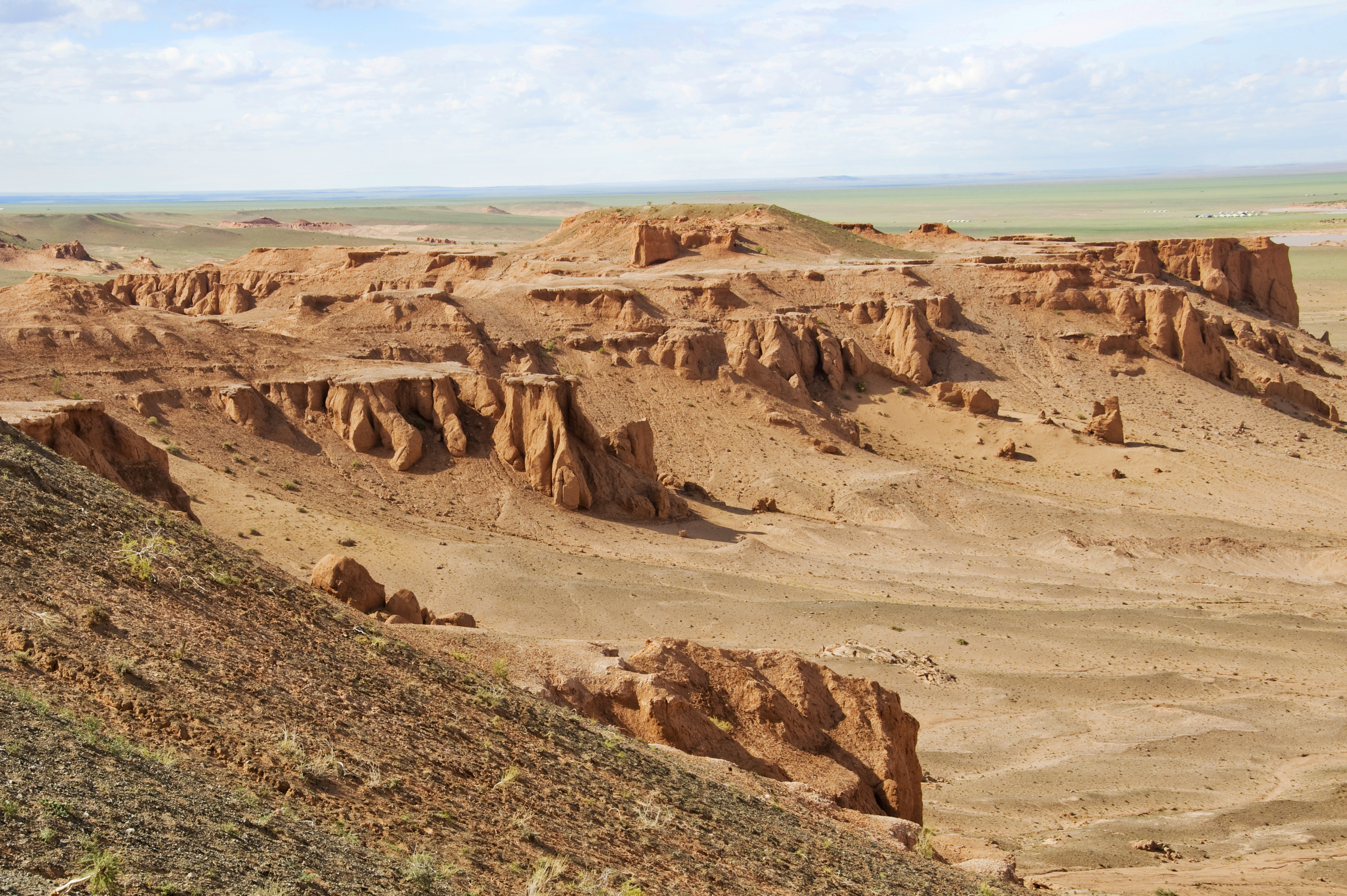
The Flaming Cliffs of Mongolia in the Gobi Desert. The holotype remains of Oviraptor were found in this highly fossiliferous locality of the Djadokhta Formation

The first remains of Oviraptor were discovered on reddish sandstones of the Late Cretaceous Djadokhta Formation of Mongolia, at the Bayn Dzak locality (also known as Flaming Cliffs), during the Third Central Asiatic expedition in 1923. This expedition was led by the North American naturalist Roy Chapman Andrews and ended in the discovery of three new-to-science theropod fossil remains—including those of Oviraptor. These were formally described by the North American paleontologist Henry Fairfield Osborn in 1924, who in the basis of the new material, named the genera Oviraptor, Saurornithoides and Velociraptor. The particular genus Oviraptor was erected with the type species O. philoceratops based on the holotype AMNH 6517, a partial individual lacking the back of the skeleton but including a badly crushed skull, partial cervical and dorsal vertebrae, pectoral elements including the furcula with the left arm and partial hands, the left ilium and some ribs. Accordingly, this specimen was found lying over a nest of approximately 15 eggs—a nest that has been catalogued as AMNH 6508—with the skull separated from the eggs by only 10 cm (100 mm) of sediment. Given the close proximity of both specimens, Osborn interpreted Oviraptor as a dinosaur with egg-eating habits, and explained that the generic name, Oviraptor, is Latin for "egg seizer" or "egg thief", due to the association of the fossils. The specific name, philoceratops, is intended as "fondness for ceratopsian eggs" which is also given as a result of the initial thought of the nest pertaining to Protoceratops or another ceratopsian. However, Osborn suggested that the name Oviraptor could reflect an incorrect perception of this dinosaur. Furthermore, Osborn found Oviraptor to be similar to the unrelated—at the time, however, considered related—fast-running ornithomimids based on the toothless jaws, and assigned Oviraptor to the Ornithomimidae. Osborn had previously reported the taxon as "Fenestrosaurus philoceratops", but this was later discredited.

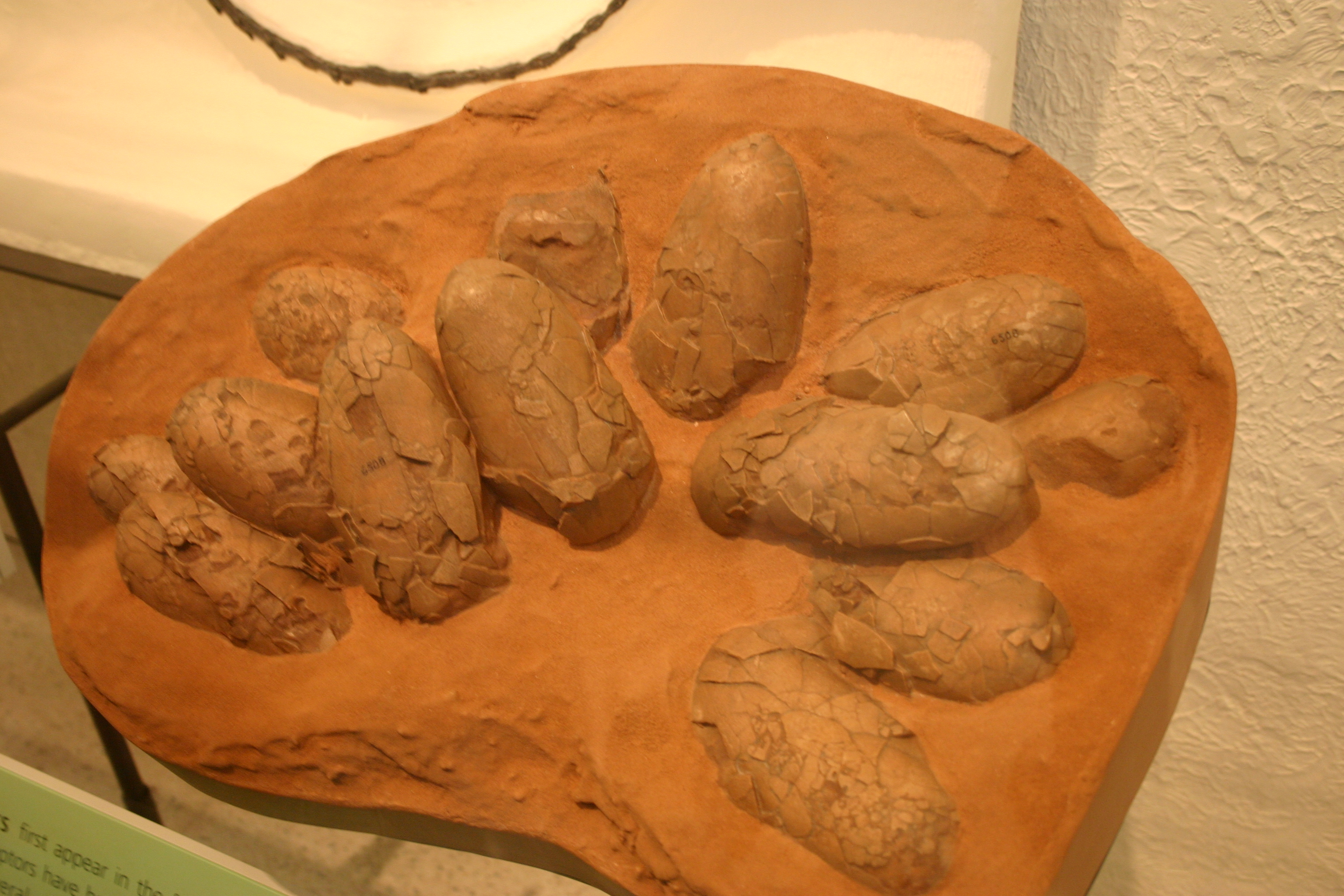
Nest AMNH 6508, which was found in association with the holotype

In 1976, the Mongolian paleontologist Rinchen Barsbold noted some inconsistencies regarding the taxonomic placement of Oviraptor and concluded that this taxon was quite distinct from ornithomimids based on anatomical traits. Under this consideration, he erected the Oviraptoridae to contain Oviraptor and close relatives. After Osborn's initial description of Oviraptor, the egg nest associated with the holotype was accepted to have belonged to Protoceratops, and oviraptorids were largely considered to have been egg-eating theropods. Nevertheless, in the 1990s, the discovery of numerous nesting and nestling oviraptorid specimens proved that Osborn was correct in his caution regarding the name of Oviraptor. These findings showed that oviraptorids brooded and protected their nests by crouching on them. This new line of evidence showed that the nest associated with the holotype of Oviraptor belonged to it and the specimen was actually brooding the eggs at the time of death, not preying on them.

=== Referred specimens ===
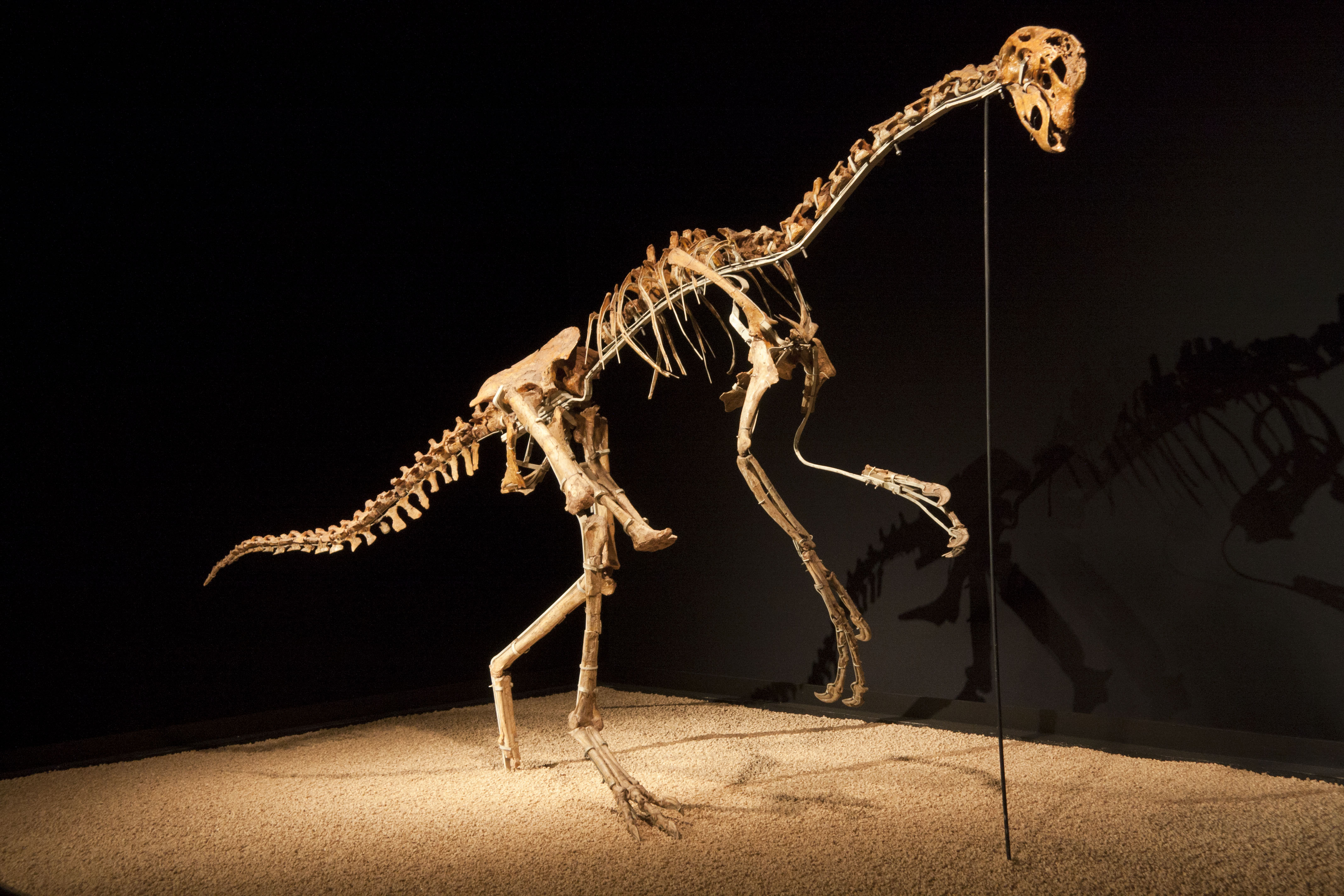
Mounted MPC-D 100/42; a specimen that became the major reference for Oviraptor but was later disproven due to cranial differences

After the naming of Oviraptoridae in 1976, Barsbold referred six additional specimens to Oviraptor, including two particular specimens under the number MPC-D 100/20 and 100/21. In 1986, Barsbold realized that the latter two did not belong to the genus and instead they represented a new oviraptorid: Conchoraptor. Most of the other specimens are also unlikely to belong to Oviraptor itself, and they have been assigned to other oviraptorids. A partial individual also with eggs from the Bayan Mandahu Formation of China was referred in 1996 by Dong Zhiming and Philip J. Currie, the specimen IVPP V9608. However, in 2010 Nicholas R. Longrich and the two latter paleontologist have expressed their uncertainties regarding this referral as there are several anatomical differences such as the hand phalangeal proportions. They concluded that this specimen was a different and indeterminate species not referrable to this taxon. In 1981, Barsbold referred the specimen MPC-D 100/42 to Oviraptor, a very well-preserved and rather complete individual from the Djadokhta Formation. Since the known elements of Oviraptor were so fragmentary compared to other members, MPC-D 100/42 became the prime reference/depiction of this taxon being prominently labelled as Oviraptor philoceratops in scientific literature.

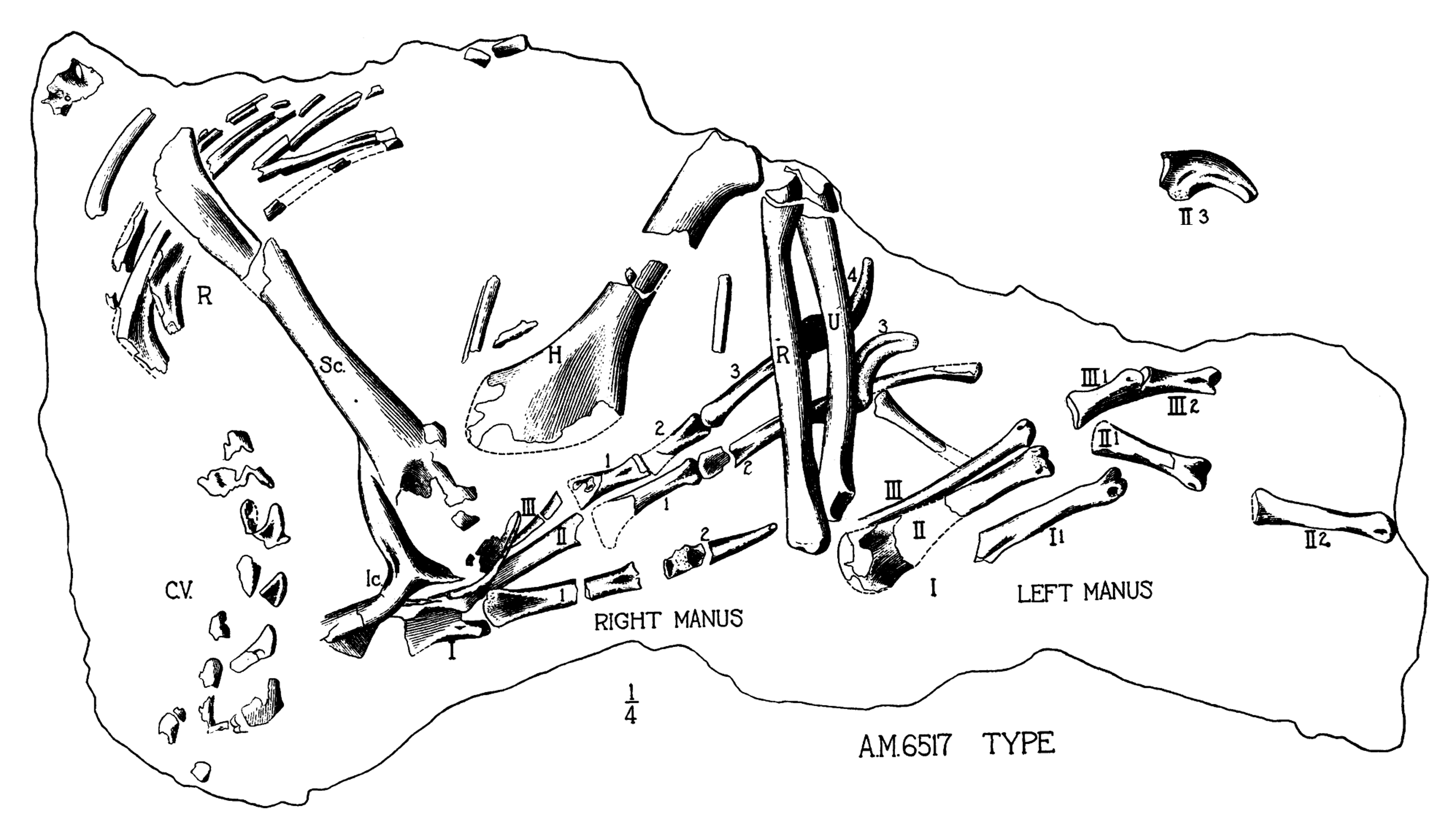
Line drawing of the arms preserved within the holotype

This conception was refuted by James M. Clark and colleagues in 2002, who noted that this tall-crested specimen has more features of the skull in common with Citipati than it does with Oviraptor—which in fact, does not preserve a crest—and it may represent a second species of the former, or, an entire new genus. In 1986, Barsbold described a second species of Oviraptor, "O. mongoliensis", based on specimen MPC-D 100/32a which hails from the Nemegt Formation. However, a re-examination by Barsbold in 1997 found enough differences in this specimen to name the new genus Rinchenia, but he did not describe it with formality and this new oviraptorid remained as a nomen dubium. This was amended by the Polish paleontologist Halszka Osmólska and team in 2004 by formally naming the taxon Rinchenia mongoliensis. The North American paleontologist Mark A. Norell and colleagues in 2018 reported a new specimen of Oviraptor: AMNH 33092, which is composed of a tibia and two metatarsals of a nestling or very small juvenile. AMNH 33092 was found in association with the holotype and it was likely part of the nest. Oviraptor is now known from the holotype with associated eggs, and a juvenile/nestling.

== Description ==
Size comparison of the holotype

The holotype specimen has been estimated at 1.6–2 m (5.2–6.6 ft) in length with a weight ranging from 33 to 40 kg (73 to 88 lb). Though the holotype largely lacks the posterior region of the skeleton, it is likely that Oviraptor had two well-developed hindlimbs that ended in three functional toes with the first one being vestigial, as well as a relatively reduced tail. As evidenced in related oviraptorids, the arms were covered by elongated feathers, and the tail ended in a pygostyle, which is known to support a fan of feathers.

=== Skull ===
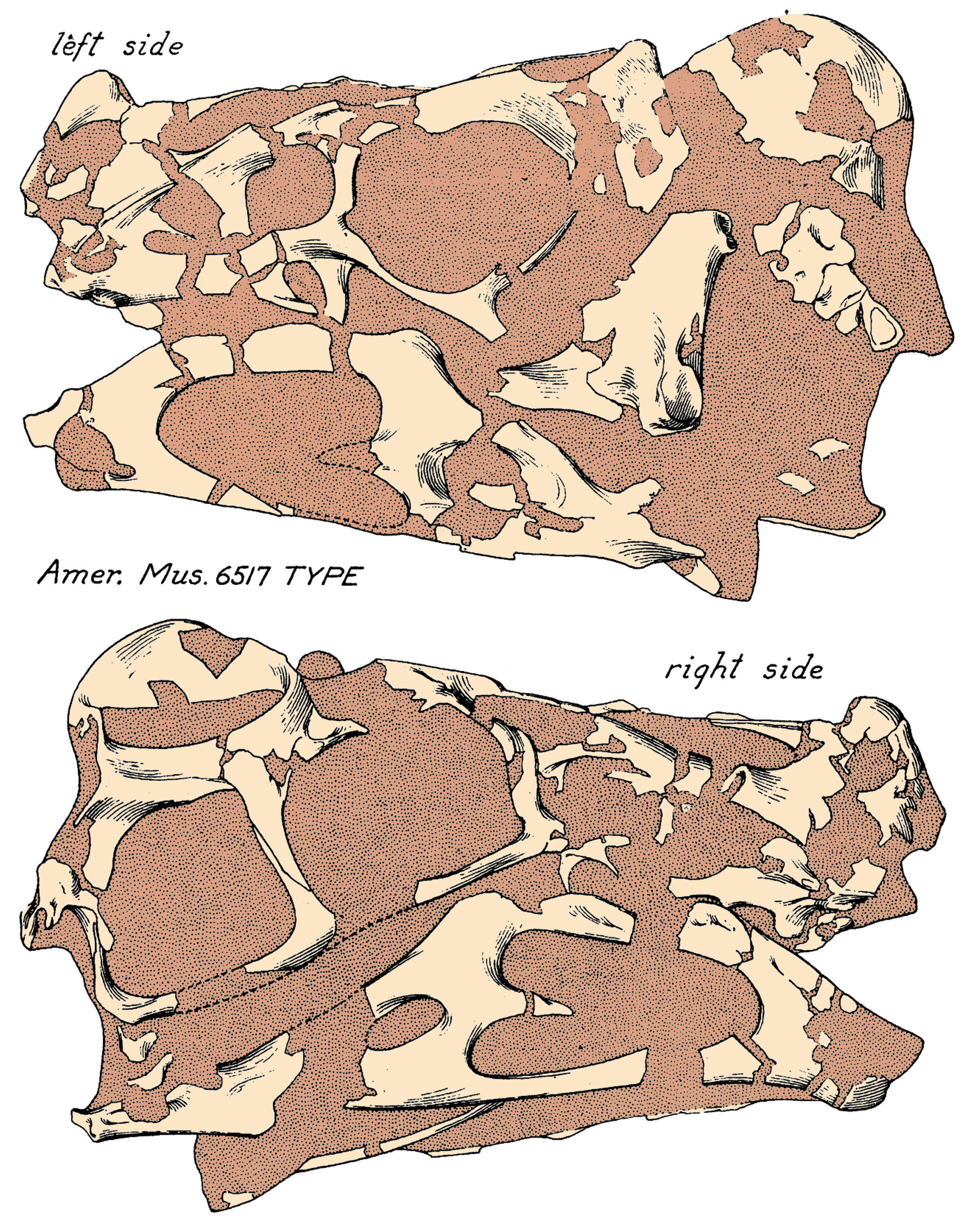
Osborn's line drawing of the holotype skull

The skull of Oviraptor was deep and shortened with large fenestrae (openings) compared to other dinosaurs, and measures about 17.9 cm (7.03125 in) long as preserved. The actual length may actually be longer though, given that the holotype skull lacks several regions such as the premaxilla. The holotype skull lacks a crest in almost its entirety, however, the top surfaces of the fused parietal and frontal bones indicate that it likely had a well-developed crest, supported by the nasal and premaxilla bones (mainly the latter) of the rostrum. Oviraptor had an elongated maxilla and dentary, which may result into a more extended snout compared to the highly stocky jaws of other oviraptorids. The palate is rigid, extended below the jaw line and formed by the premaxillae, vomers, and maxillae. As in other oviraptorids, it may have had a pair of tooth-like projections on the palate that were directed downwards. As in other oviraptorids, the nares (external nostrils) would have been relatively small and placed high on the skull. Oviraptor had toothless jaws that ended in a robust, parrot-like rhamphotheca (horny beak). The curvature of the dentary tip was down-turned but less pronounced than other oviraptorids, such as Citipati. As a whole, the lower jaw is a short and deep bone that covers 19.5 cm (195 mm).

=== Postcranial skeleton ===
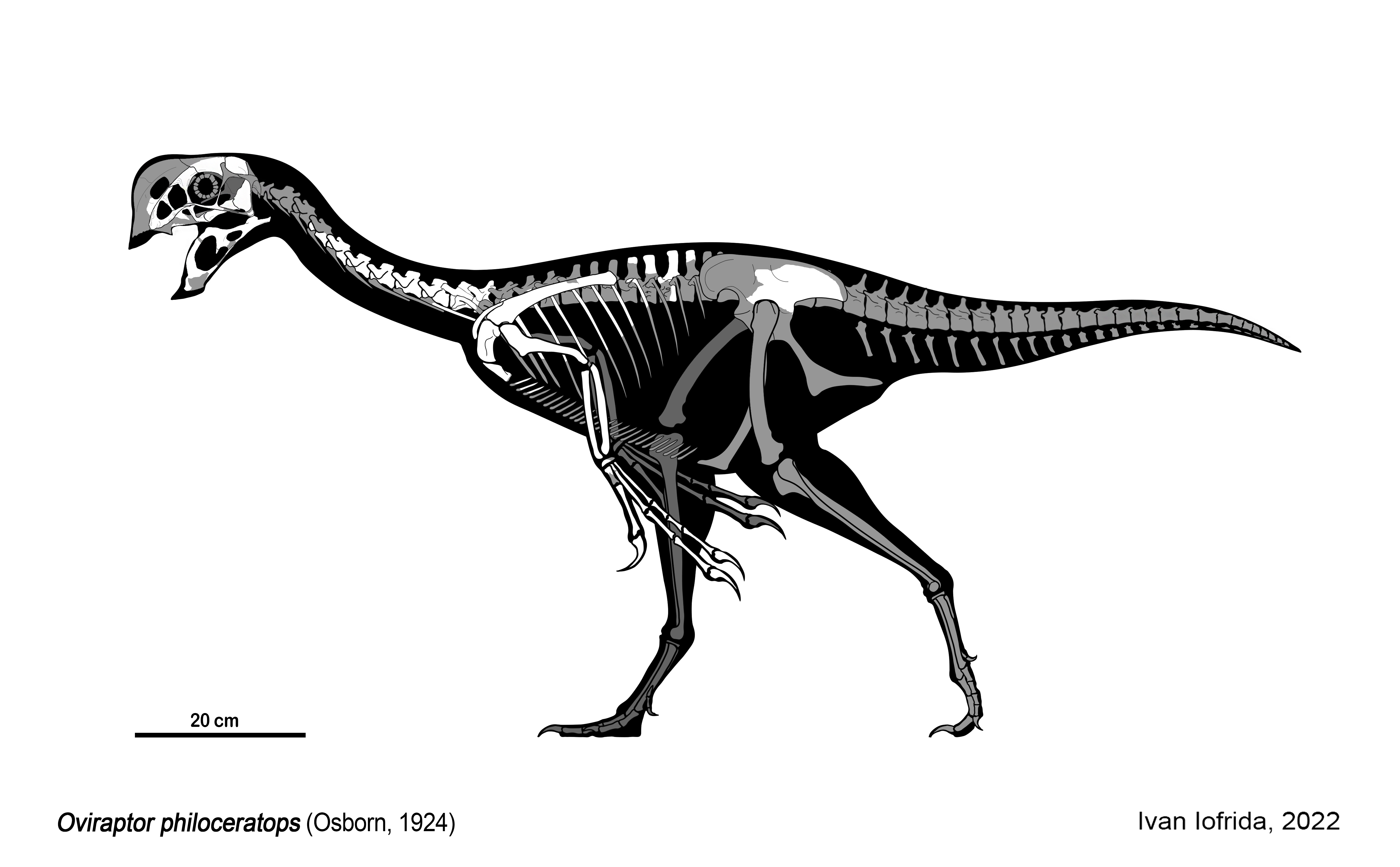
Skeletal reconstruction of the holotype, known remains in white

As in most oviraptorids, the neural spines of the holotype cervical vertebrae were short, and the neural arches were X-shaped. However the spines become more pronounced in posterior vertebrae. The zygapophyses of the first cervical vertebrae are configured parallel to each other, and the postzygapophyses appear to not diverge significantly from the midline, mostly similar to Citipati. The cervical ribs are fused to the vertebrae in the holotype. The neural spines are rectangular in the anterior series of the dorsal vertebrae when seen in a lateral view and larger than the spines of the cervicals. On the anteriormost dorsal vertebra several pleurocoels (small air-spaced holes) can be found, which are similar to those of Khaan.

The furcula of Oviraptor is very distinct from other oviraptorids in having a midline keel on the anterior surface of the hypocleidium−a downwards directed projection at the center of the furcula. This bone is V-shaped, rounded in cross-section, preserves an elongate spike-like hypocleidium, and the interclavicular angle is about 90°. The scapulocoracoid is fused in the holotype, however, the coracoid is badly damaged. The scapula is slightly bowed and measures 23 cm (230 mm) in length. Oviraptor had a relatively elongated arm composed of the humerus, radius, ulna, and manus.

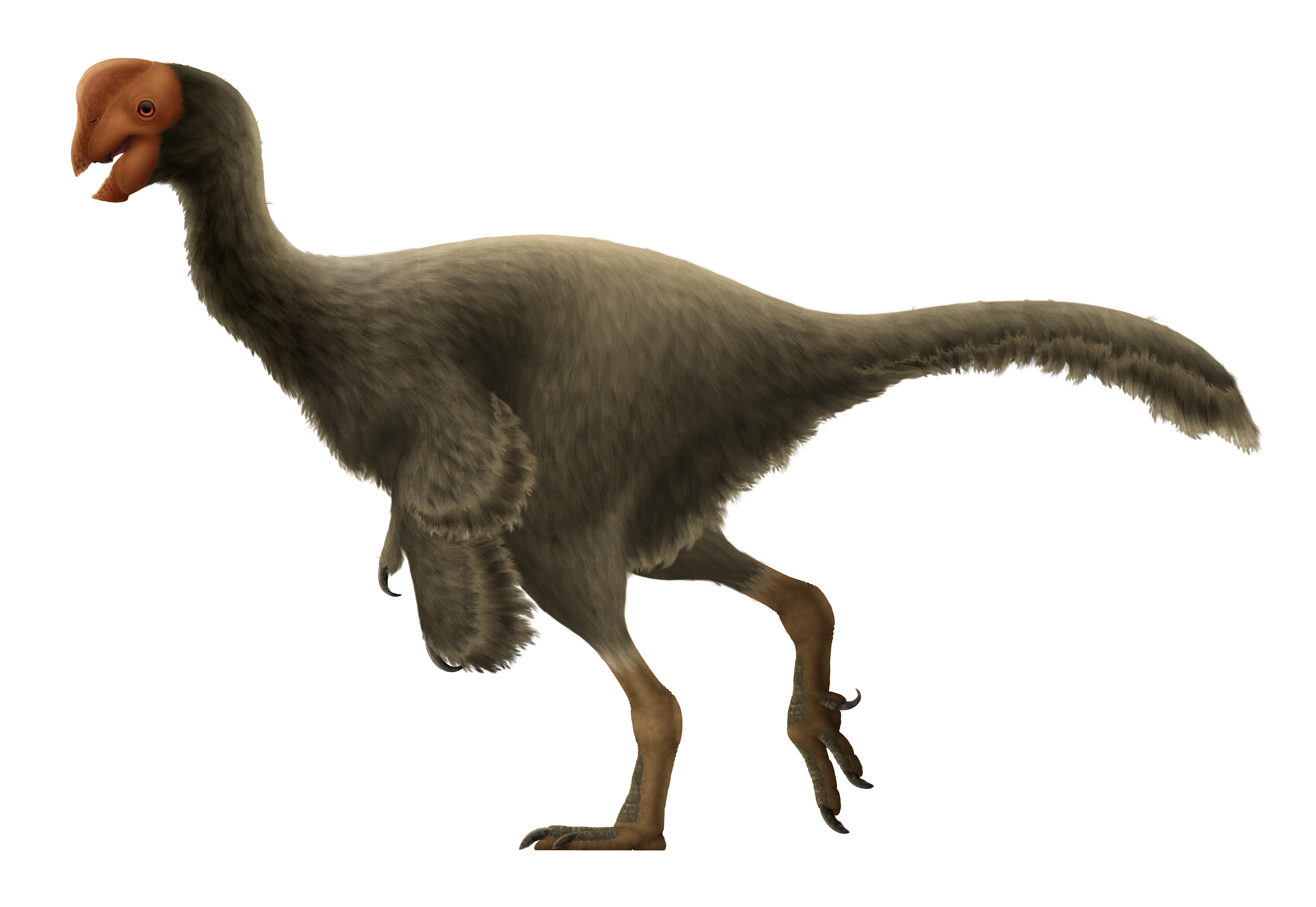
Life restoration

The phalangeal formula of Oviraptor was 2-3-4, as seen in most other theropods and oviraptorids. The hand of Oviraptor had three skinny and bird-like fingers with each finger ended in side to side flattened and recurved unguals (claw bone). Unlike some oviraptorids, Oviraptor did not suffer a reduction of the second and third finger relative to the first one. The regarded juvenile Oviraptor AMNH 33092 preserves hindlimb material, comprising a right tibia with metatarsals III and IV. Its tibia is 5.87 cm (58.7 mm) long, indicating a substantially smaller individual than the holotype. The nest AMNH 6508 preserves elongatoolithid eggs, with each egg being 14 cm (140 mm) long (some are incomplete). Nevertheless, there is the possibility that taphonomical crushing may have compressed them by up to 2 cm (20 mm).

== Classification ==
Oviraptor was originally allied with the ornithomimids by Osborn due to its toothless beak. Osborn also found similarities with Chirostenotes, which is still considered a close relative of Oviraptor. In 1976, Barsbold erected a new family to contain Oviraptor and its close kin, making Oviraptor the type genus of the Oviraptoridae. During the redescription of the holotype skull in 2002 by Clark and colleagues, they noted that Oviraptor had a relatively elongated maxilla and dentary. These traits are less pronounced in derived oviraptorids and suggests that Oviraptor belongs to the near base of the Oviraptoridae.

The cladogram below follows an analysis by Gregory F. Funston and colleagues in 2020:

- Oviraptoridae
  - Nankangia
  - unnamed
    - Oviraptor
    - unnamed
      - Yulong
      - unnamed
        - Citipatiinae
        - Heyuanninae

== Paleobiology ==
=== Feeding ===
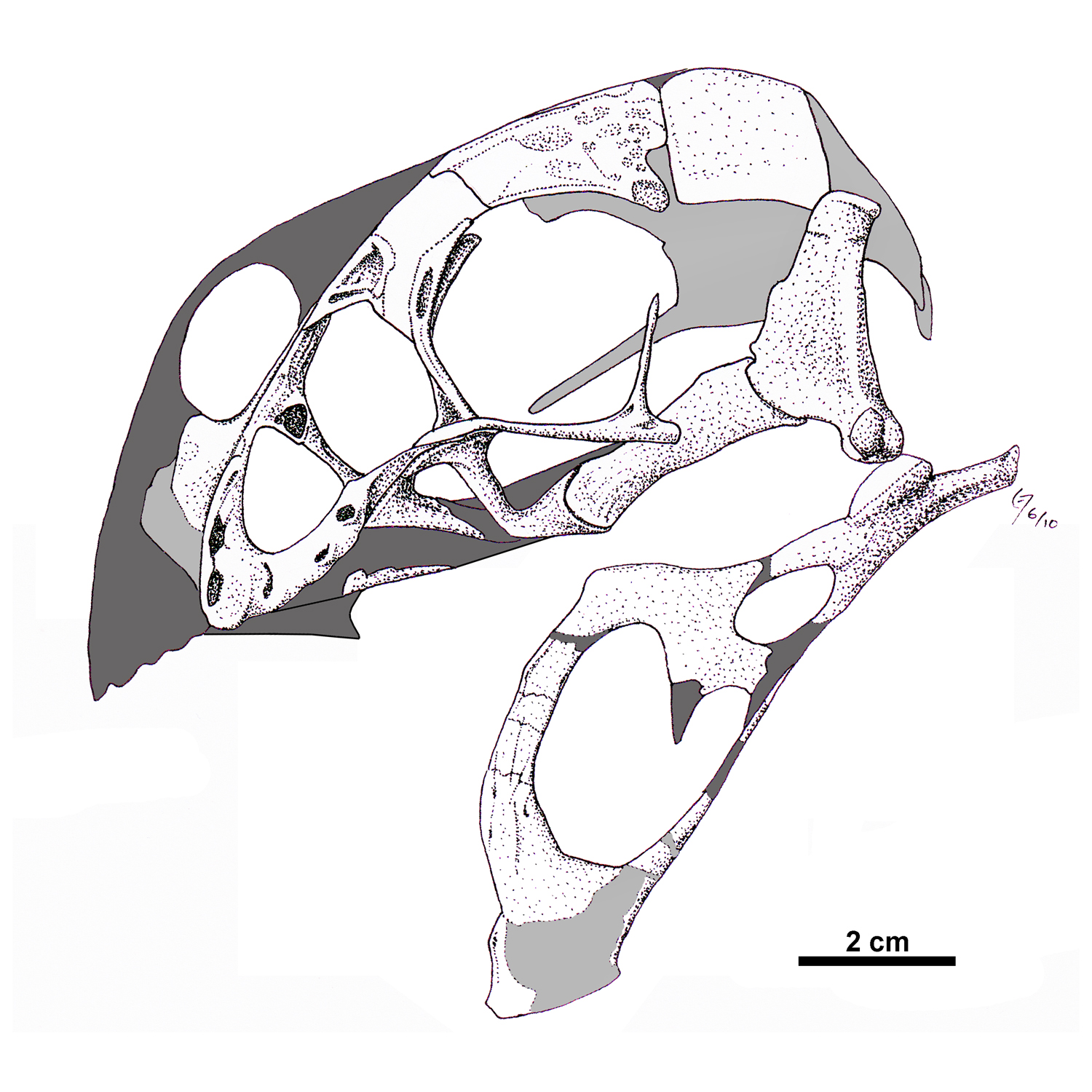
Restored holotype skull of Oviraptor

When first described in 1924 by Osborn, Oviraptor was originally presumed to have been ovivorous—an organism that has an egg-based diet—based on the association of the holotype with a nest thought to belong to Protoceratops. In 1977, Barsbold proposed a crushing jaw hypothesis. He argued that the strength of the robust lower jaws and likely rhamphotheca (horny beak) was strong enough to break the shells of mollusks such as clams, which are found in the same geological formation as Oviraptor. These bones form part of the main upper jaw bone or maxilla, which converge in the middle to form a pair of prongs. The rhamphotheca and lower jaws together with the extension of several bones from the palate, would have made a piercing tool. Barsbold also suggested that oviraptorids could have had a semiaquatic life-style based on the mollusk-based diet, the high location of nasal cavities, an augmented musculature of the tail, and the greater size of the first manual digit. In a 1990 conference abstract, David K. Smith presented an osteological reevaluation of Oviraptor where he rejected the statements made by Barsbold. He found no evidence indicating a forelimb specialized in aquatic locomotion, and the jaws, rather than preserve a crushing mechanism, preserve shearing surfaces. As the skull is toothless, lightly built and lacks several strong muscle insertion areas, Smith suggested that leaves may have been an important part in the diet of Oviraptor. However, in 1995, Norell and colleagues reported the fragmented remains of a lizard in the body cavity of the holotype specimen, suggesting that Oviraptor was partially carnivorous.

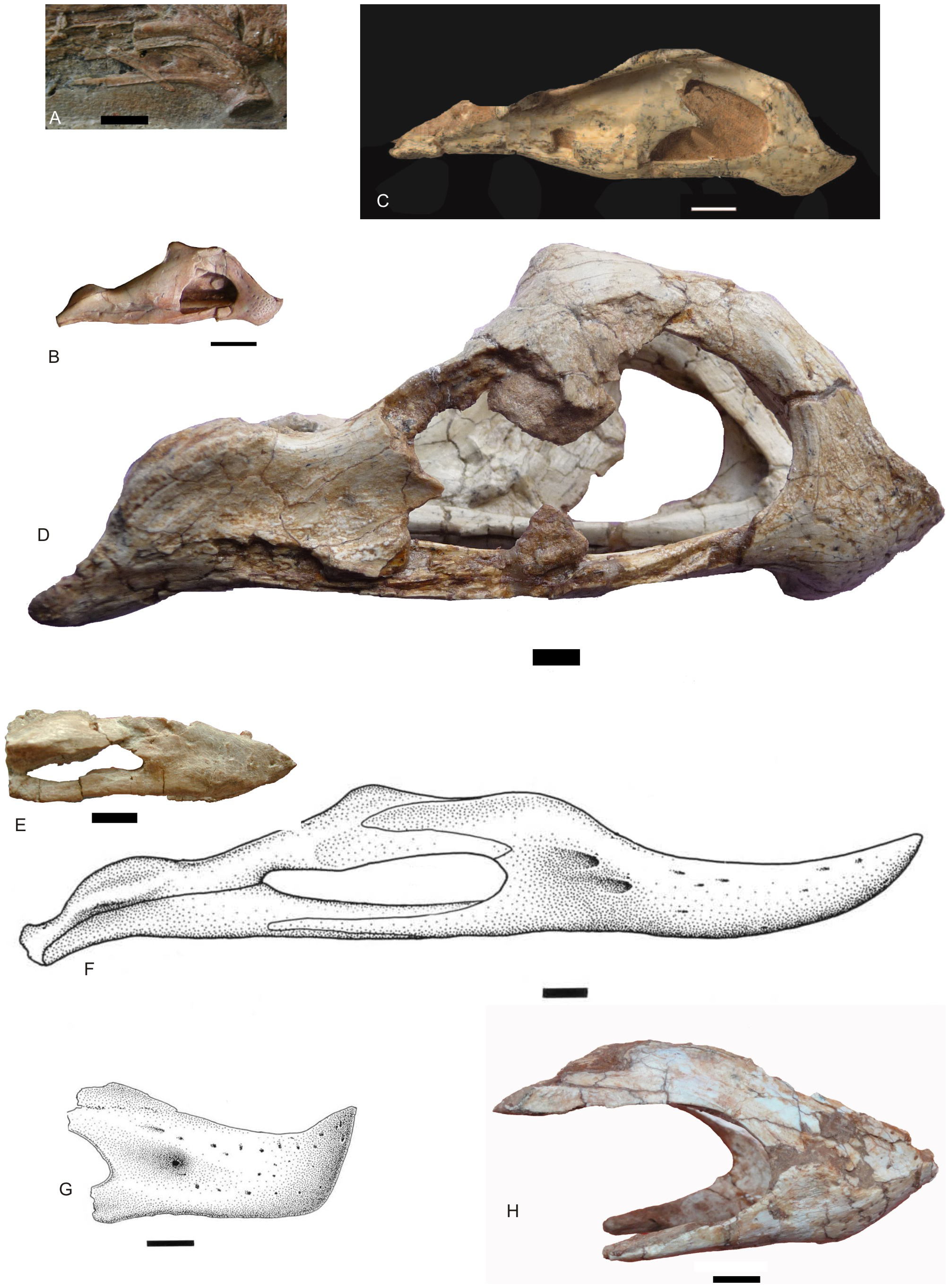
Comparison of the lower jaw of several oviraptorosaur genera

In 2008, Stig Olav K. Jansen compared the skull of several oviraptorid species to those of birds and turtles to investigate which properties can predict a rhamphotheca. He found the lower jaws of oviraptorids to be very similar to those of parrots, and the upper jaws to be more similar to those of turtles. Based on these observations, Jansen suggested that oviraptorids were omnivorous as the sharply developed rhamphotheca together with the prominent forelimbs would have been adapted to catch and tear small prey. Moreover, the pointed projections of the palate would have contributed in holding prey. Jansen pointed out that a fully herbivorous diet in oviraptorids seems unlikely as they lacked flat and wide tomia (cutting edges of the mandibles) to chew, and were unable to move the lower jaws sideways. However, he considered the lower jaws strong enough to have at least crushed elements like eggs, nuts or other hard seeds.

Longrich and colleagues in 2010 also rejected a durophagous (animals that practise shell-crushing) hypothesis, given that such animals typically develop teeth with broad crushing surfaces. The pointed shape of the dentary bones in the lower jaws suggests that oviraptorids had a sharp-edged rhamphotheca used for shearing food instead. The symphyseal (bone union) region at the front of the dentary may have given some ability for crushing, but as this was a relatively small area, it was probably not the main function of the jaws. Another argument against them having been eaters of mollusks is the fact that most oviraptorids have been found in sediments that are interpreted to represent mostly arid or semi-arid environments, such as Oviraptor in the Djadokhta Formation. The team also found that oviraptorids and dicynodonts share cranial features such as short, deep, and toothless mandibles; elongated dentary symphyses; elongated mandibular openings; and a pointed palate. Modern animals with jaws that resemble those of oviraptorids include parrots and tortoises; the latter group also has tooth-like projections on the palatal region. Longrich and colleagues concluded that due to the similarities between oviraptorids and herbivorous animals, the bulk of their diet would most likely have been formed by plant material. The jaws of oviraptorids may have been specialised for processing food, such as xerophytic vegetation−a vegetation that is adapted for environments with little water—that would have grown in their arid environments, but this is not possible to demonstrate, as little is known about the paleoflora of the Gobi Desert.

In 2018 however, Funston and colleagues supported the crushing jaw hypothesis. They pointed out that the stocky rostrum and robust lower jaws of oviraptorids suggest, in fact, a strong and nipping bite, which is rather similar to those of parrots. Funston and colleagues considered these anatomical traits of oviraptorids to be consistent with a frugivorous diet that incorporated nuts and seeds.

=== Reproduction ===
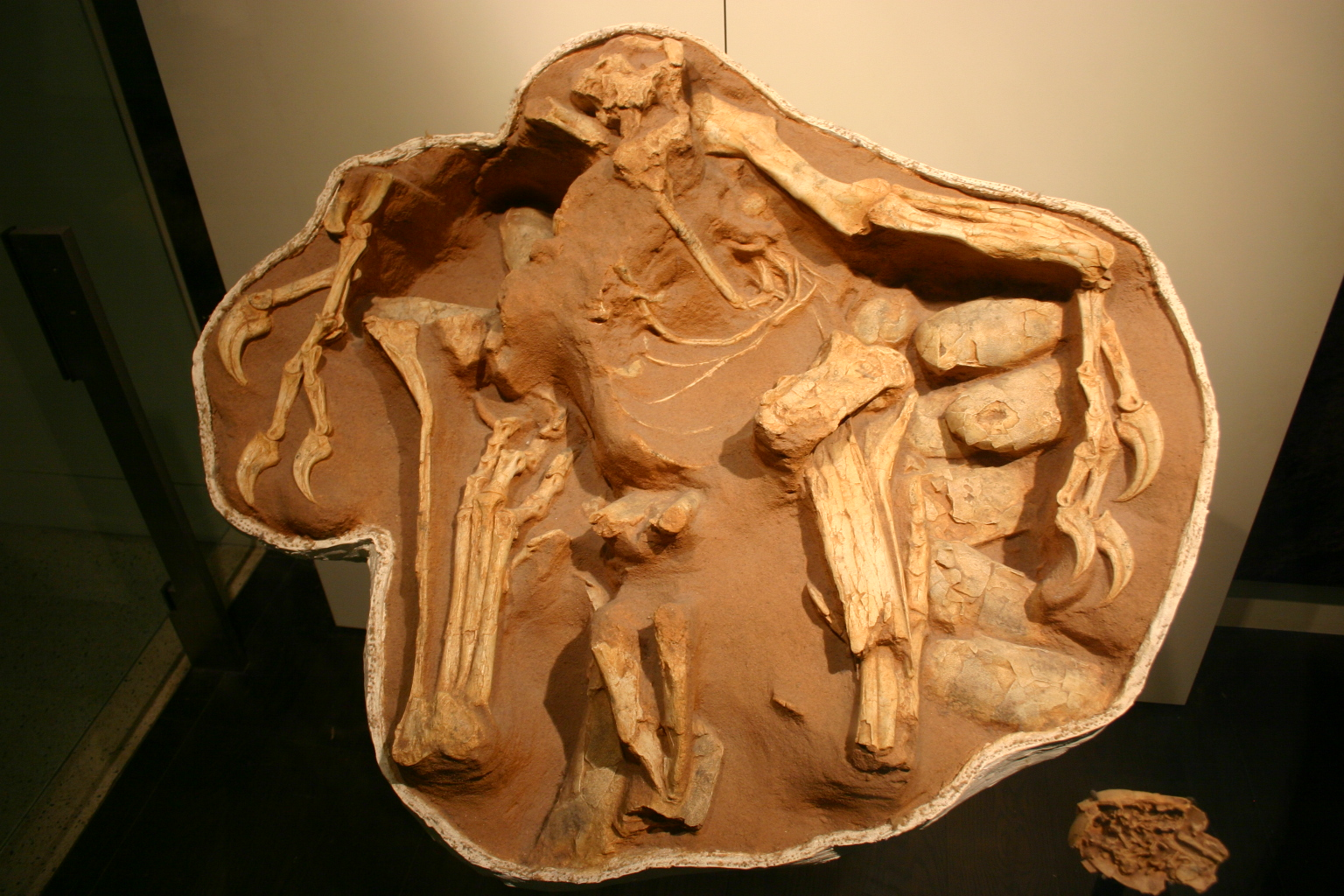
Citipati nesting specimen

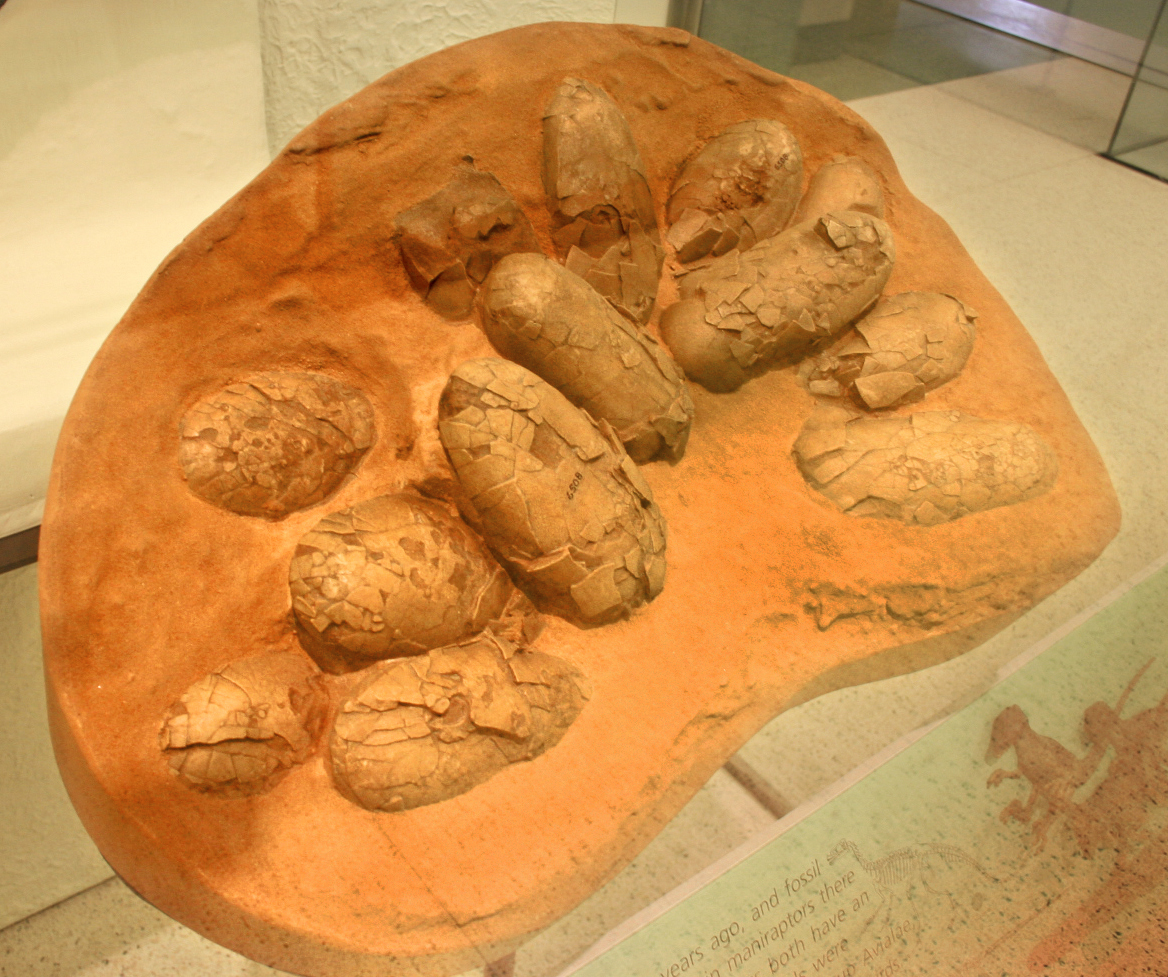
Oviraptor nest AMNH 6508

Since the description of the embryonic Citipati specimen in 1994, oviraptorids became more understood: instead of having been egg-eating animals, they actually brooded and cared for the nests. This specimen showed that the holotype of Oviraptor was likely a sexually mature individual that perished incubating the associated nest with eggs. This new behavior on oviraptorids became more clear with the report and short description of an adult nesting specimen of Citipati in 1995 by Norell and colleagues. The specimen was found on top of egg clutches, with its hindlimbs crouched symmetrically on each side of the nest and the forelimbs covering the nest perimeter. This brooding posture is found today only in modern avian dinosaurs and supports a behavioral link between the latter group and non-avian dinosaurs. In 1996, Dong and Currie described a new nesting oviraptorid specimen from the Bayan Mandahu Formation. It was found lying atop a nest composed by approximately 6 eggs as preserved, and these were laid in a mound-shaped structure with a circular pattern. As the specimen was found over the nest with its forelimbs covering the eggs and the partially preserved hindfoot near the center of the nest, Dong and Currie suggested that it was caught and buried by a sandstorm during incubation. They ruled out the possibility of oviraptorids being egg-thieves as they would have either consumed or instinctively abandoned the nest long before it was buried by a sandstorm or another meteorological phenomenon.

In 1999 Clark and team described in detail the previously reported Citipati nesting specimen and briefly discussed the holotype specimen of Oviraptor and its association with the nest AMNH 6508. They pointed out that the exact position in which the holotype was found over the nest is unclear as they were separated during preparation, and the nest appears to be not entirely complete with about 15 eggs preserved of which two damaged. Moreover, the semicircular arrangement of the nest indicates that the eggs were laid in pairs and in at least three rings, and this nest was originally circular, similar to a mound.

Thomas P. Hopp and Mark J. Orsen in 2004 analyzed the brooding behavior of extinct and extant dinosaur species, including oviraptorids, in order to evaluate the reason for the elongation and development of wing and tail feathers. Given that the most complete oviraptorid nesting specimen—at the time, the 1995 Citipati nesting specimen—was found in a very avian-like posture, with the forelimbs in a near-folded posture and the pectoral region, belly, and feet in contact with the eggs, Hopp and Orsen indicated that long pennaceous feathers and a feather covering were most likely present in life. The "wings" and tail of oviraptorids would have granted protection for the eggs and hatchlings against climate factors like the sunlight, wind, and rainfalls. However, the arms of this specimen were not extremely folded as in some modern birds, instead, they are more extended resembling the style of large flightless birds like the ostrich. The extended position of the arm is also similar to the brooding behavior of this bird, which is known to nest in large clutches like oviraptorids. Based on the forelimb position of nesting oviraptorids, Hopp and Orsen proposed brooding as the ancestral reason behind wing and tail feather elongation, as there was a greater need to provide optimal protection for eggs and juveniles.

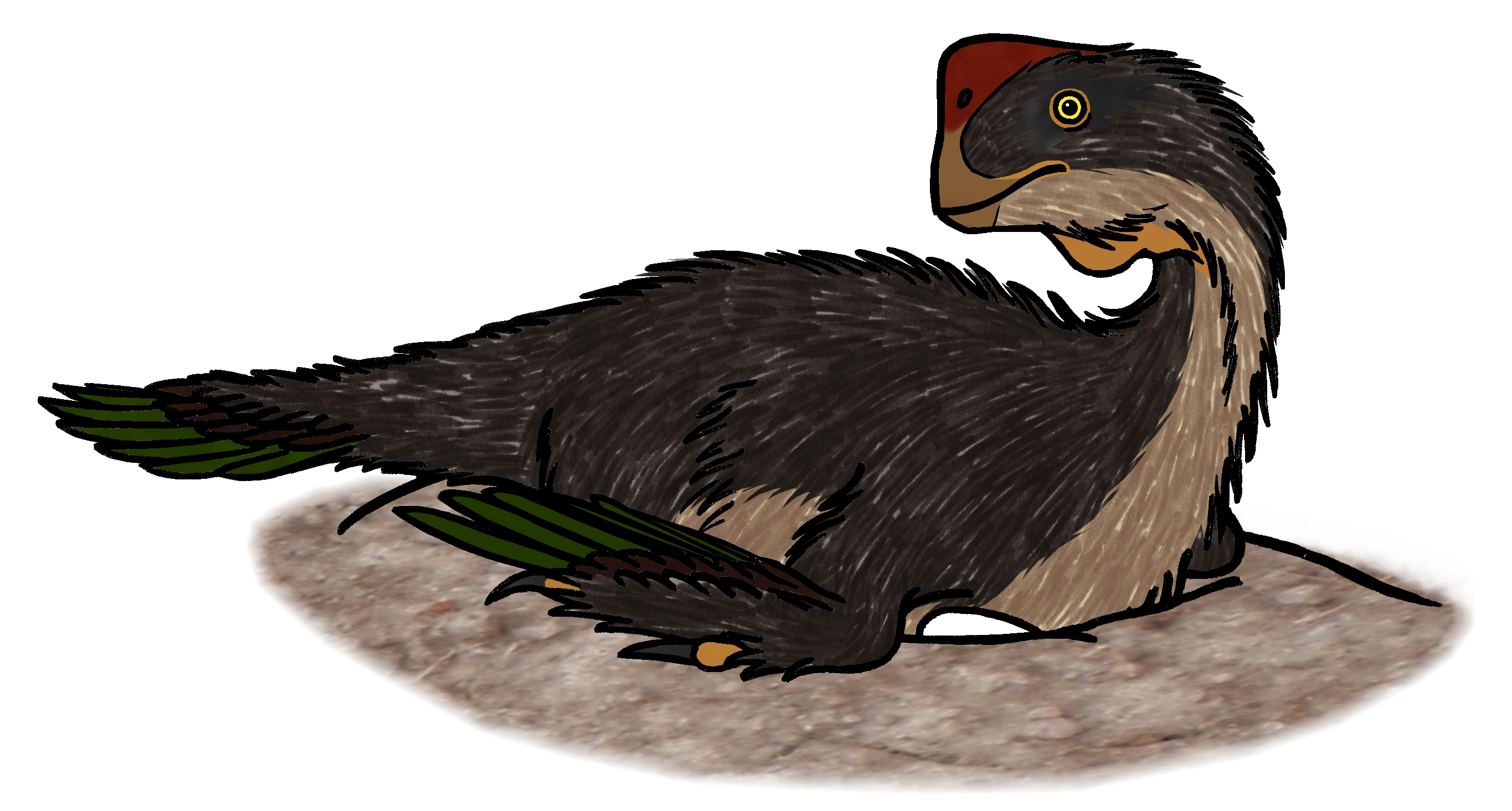
Life restoration of a nesting Oviraptor. Oviraptorids may have sat on their nests during incubation

In 2005, Tamaki Sato and team reported an unusual oviraptorid specimen from the Nanxiong Formation. This new specimen was found preserving mainly the pelvic region with two eggs inside and thereby indicating a female. The size and position of the eggs suggest that oviraptorids retained two functional oviducts, but had reduced the number of eggs ovulated to one per oviduct. David J. Varricchio and colleagues in 2008 found that the relatively large egg clutch-size of oviraptorids and troodontids is most similar to those of modern birds that practice polygamous mating and extensive male parental care, such as ratite birds, suggesting similar habits. This reproductive system is most likely to represent the ancestral condition for modern birds, with biparental care (where both parents participate) being a later development. In 2014, W. Scott Persons and colleagues suggested that oviraptorosaurs were secondarily flightless and several of the traits in their tails may indicate a propensity for display behaviour, such as courtship display. The tail of several oviraptorosaurs and oviraptorids ended in pygostyles, a bony structure at the end of the tail that, at least in modern birds, is used to support a feather fan. Furthermore, the tail was notably muscular and had a pronounced flexibility, which may have aided in courtship movements.

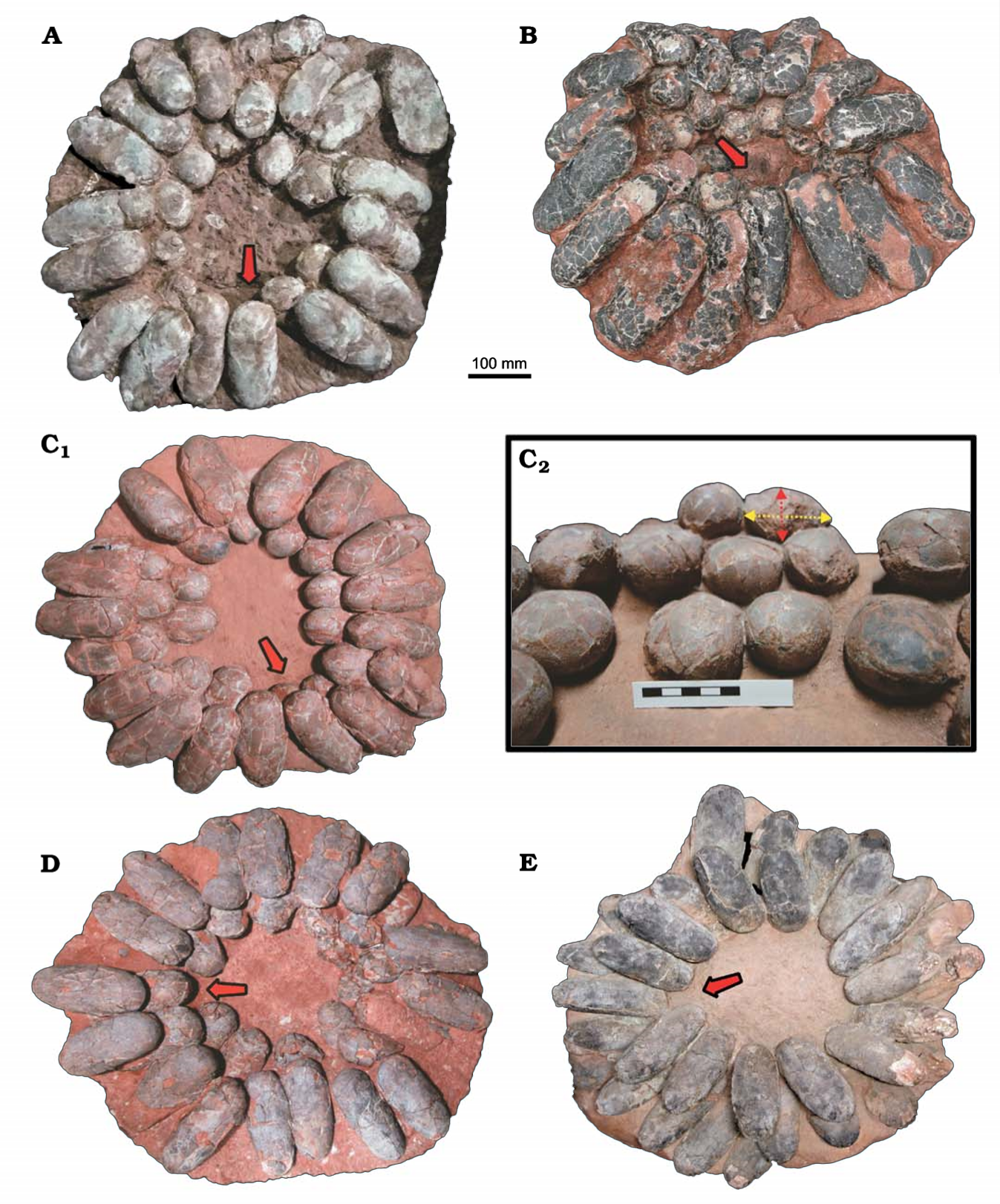
Complete oviraptorid egg clutches from the Nanxiong Formation

In 2018, Tzu-Ruei Yang and colleagues identified cuticle layers on several egg-shells of maniraptoran dinosaurs including those of oviraptorids. These particular layers are composed of proteins, polysaccharides and pigments, but mainly of lipids and hydroxyapatite. In modern birds they serve to protect the eggs from dehydration and invasion of microorganisms. As most oviraptorid specimens have been found in formations of caliche-based sedimentation, Yang and colleagues suggested that the cuticle-coated eggs would have been a reproductive strategy adapted for enhancing their hatching success in such arid climates and environments.

In 2019 Yang and colleagues re-evaluated the hypothesis of thermoregulatory contact incubation using complete oviraptorid nests from the Nanxiong Formation, and provided a detailed reconstruction of the architecture of the oviraptorid clutch. They noted that adult oviraptorid specimens in association with nest were not necessarily incubating the eggs as they could represent a female in the process of laying eggs, and the multi-ring clutch prevented sufficient heat transfer from the parent to the inner rings of eggs. An average oviraptorid nest was built as a gently inclined mound with a highly organized architecture: the eggs were likely pigmented and arranged in pairs with each pair arranged in three to four elliptical rings. As the parent was likely operating from the nest center, this region was devoid of eggs. Yang and colleagues concluded the oviraptorid nesting style was so unique that they lack modern analogs, therefore, using oviraptorid reproduction may not be the best example to inform about the evolution of bird reproductive strategies. However, the team was unable to determinate if the juvenile Oviraptor AMNH 33092 had hatched from the nest associated with the holotype.

== Paleoenvironment ==
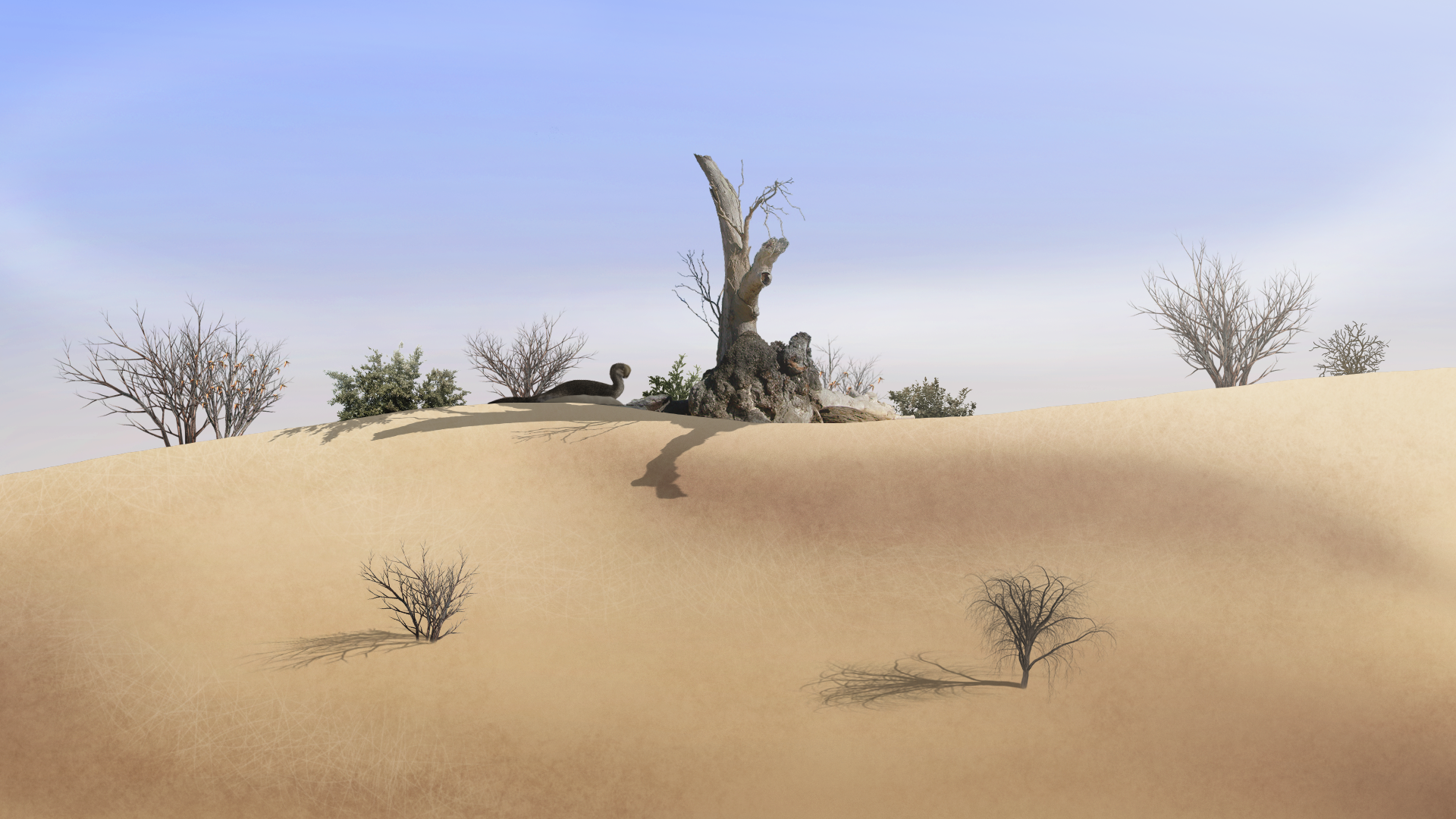
Restoration of a resting Oviraptor at the Djadokhta Formation

Oviraptor is known from the Bayn Dzak locality of the Djadokhta Formation in Mongolia, a formation that dates back to the Late Cretaceous about 71 million to 75 million years ago. The paleoenvironment of the Djadokhta Formation is interpreted as having a semiarid climate, with sand dune and alluvial settings similar to the modern Gobi Desert. The semiarid steppe landscape was drained by intermittent streams and was sometimes affected by dust and sandstorms, and moisture was seasonal. Though this formation is largely considered to preserved highly arid environments, several short-lived water bodies have been reported from the Ukhaa Tolgod locality, based on fluvial sedimentation. Furthermore, it is thought that later in the Campanian age and into the Maastrichtian, the climate would shift to the more humid fluvial environment seen in the Nemegt Formation.

The Djadokhta Formation is separated into a lower Bayn Dzak Member and an upper Turgrugyin Member. The known remains of Oviraptor have been produced by the Bayn Dzak member, which has also yielded the dinosaurs Bainoceratops, Pinacosaurus, Protoceratops, Saurornithoides, Velociraptor, and Halszkaraptor. Further dinosaur fauna from this member includes that of the Ukhaa Tolgod locality, composed of Apsaravis, Byronosaurus, Citipati, Gobipteryx, Khaan, Kol, Shuuvuia, Tsaagan, and Minotaurasaurus.

=== Taphonomy ===
The pose of the holotype of Oviraptor along with the association of eggs, suggest that it was trapped over the nest during a sandstorm, and burial was relatively rapid given that the body had no opportunity to become fully disarticulated or scavenged by predators. The paleontologist Kenneth Carpenter also agreed in that sandstorms may have been the most likely event that the eggs found in the deposits were buried. Among elements, the skull have become particularly flattened and distorted during the fossilization process.

== See also ==
- Timeline of oviraptorosaur research
