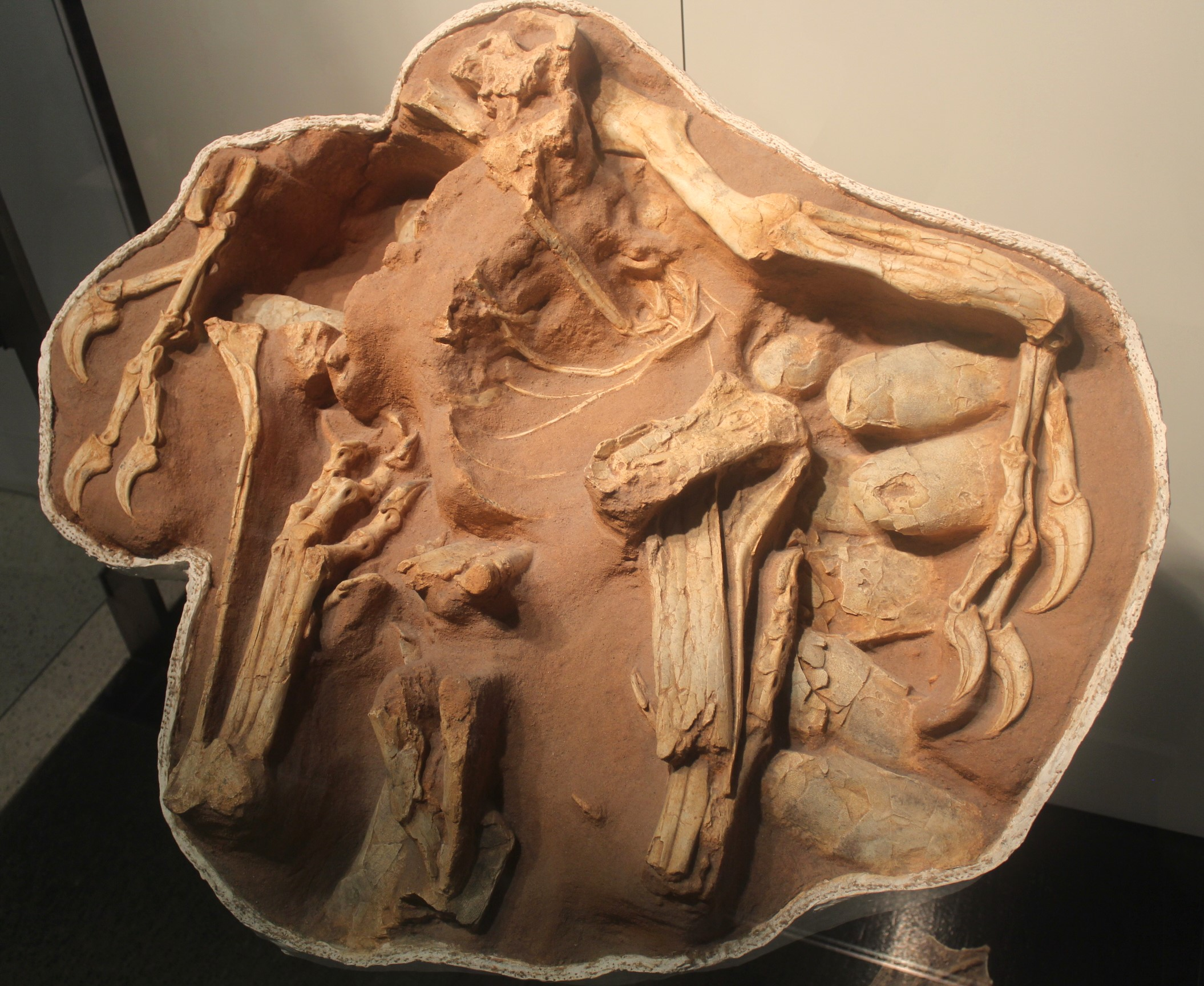
- Nesting Citipati specimen nicknamed "Big Mama", at the American Museum of Natural History

Scientific classification
- Kingdom: Animalia
- Phylum: Chordata
- Class: Reptilia
- Clade: Dinosauria
- Clade: Saurischia
- Clade: Theropoda
- Family: †Oviraptoridae
- Subfamily: †Oviraptorinae
- Genus: †Citipati; Clark et al., 2001

Type species
- †Citipati osmolskae Clark et al., 2001

= Citipati =

Citipati Temporal range: Late Cretaceous, ~75–71 Ma

Genus of oviraptorid dinosaur

Citipati ([t͡ɕit̪ipɜt̪i]; meaning "funeral pyre lord") is a genus of oviraptorid dinosaur from the Late Cretaceous of Asia, approximately 75 to 71 million years ago. It is primarily known from the Ukhaa Tolgod locality of the Djadochta Formation, where its remains were first collected during the 1990s. The genus and its type species, Citipati osmolskae were formally named and described in 2001. A second species may be represented by remains from the nearby Zamyn Khondt locality. Citipati is among the best-known oviraptorids, owing to several exceptionally preserved specimens, including individuals found in brooding positions over nests of eggs. Many of these fossils were initially assigned to the closely related genus Oviraptor. These nesting specimens have contributed to the understanding of the evolutionary relationship between non-avian dinosaurs and birds.

Citipati was among the largest oviraptorids; measuring an estimated 2.5–2.9 m (8.2–9.5 ft) in length and weighing 75–110 kg (165–243 lb). Its skull was short and highly pneumatized, with a prominent crest formed by the premaxilla and nasal bones. Both the upper and lower jaws were toothless and terminated in a horny beak. The tail ended in a pygostyle, a structure formed by the fusion of the final caudal vertebrae and associated with the support of large rectrices.

The taxon is classified as an oviraptorid, a group of feathered, bird-like dinosaurs characterized by robust, parrot-like jaws. It is among the oviraptorids known from specimens preserved in the proximity of nests. Citipati laid elongatoolithid eggs in circular, mound-shaped nests, where adults brooded them by sitting over the nest and extending their arms around its perimeter. The arms and tail were covered with long feathers, which may have provided protection for the eggs and young from exposure to the elements. Citipati may have been omnivorous, as the remains of two juvenile troodontid were discovered in a nest, suggesting that they may have been prey brought by an adult Citipati to feed its young..

== History of discovery ==
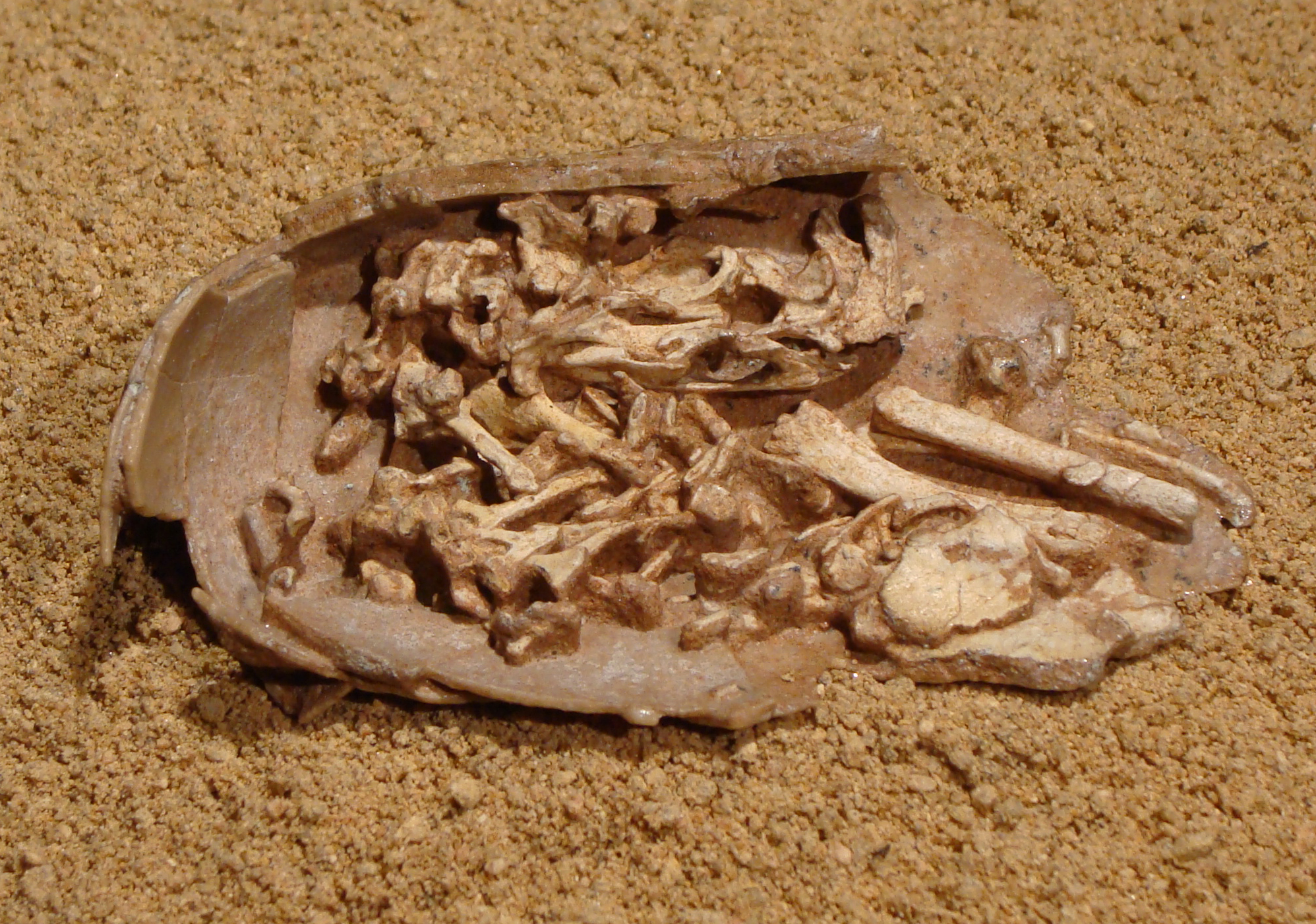
Citipati embryo IGM 100/971

In 1993, a small fossilized oviraptorid embryo, labelled as specimen IGM 100/971, was discovered in a nest at the Ukhaa Tolgod locality of the highly fossiliferous Djadokhta Formation, Gobi Desert, during the Mongolian Academy of Sciences-American Museum of Natural History paleontological project. The expedition also discovered numerous mammal, lizard, theropod, ceratopsian and ankylosaurid fossils remains at this locality, with the addition of at least five types of fossil eggs in nests. The oviraptorid embryo is composed of a nearly complete skeleton and was found in a badly weathered semi-circular nest, which also included two perinate (hatchlings or embryos close to hatching) skulls less than 5 cm (50 mm) of an unknown dromaeosaurid taxon. One of these skulls was reported to preserve portions of an eggshell. Both embryonic oviraptorid and dromaeosaurid skulls were briefly described by the paleontologist Mark A. Norell and colleagues in 1993, who considered this oviraptorid embryo to be closely related to the early named Oviraptor, and also as an evidence supporting that oviraptorids were brooding animals. The two perinates would be later identified as individuals belonging to the troodontid Byronosaurus.

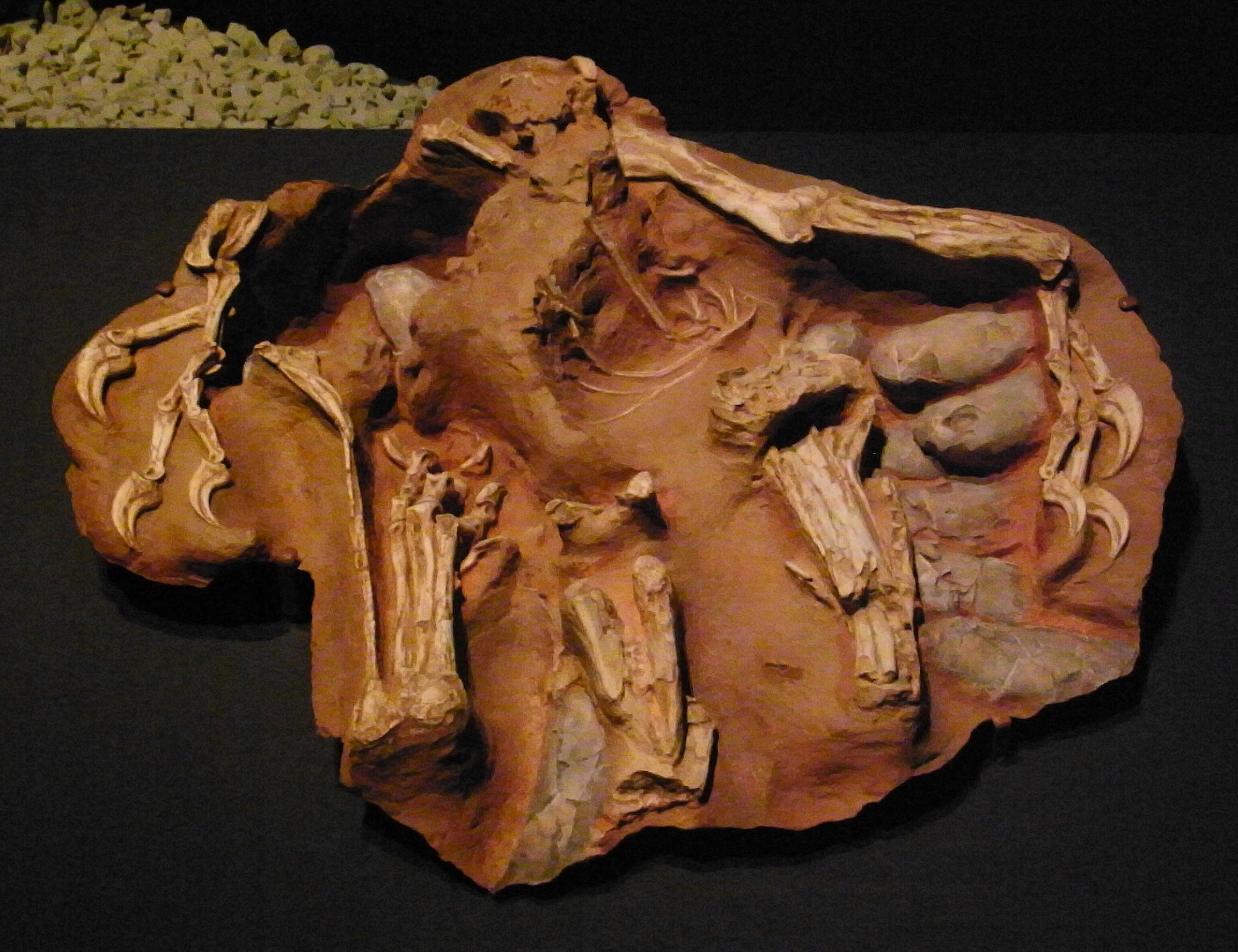
Citipati specimen IGM 100/979, popularly known as "Big Mama"

During the same year 1993, expeditions of the paleontological project of the Mongolian Academy of Sciences-American Museum of Natural History discovered a large adult oviraptorid specimen also from the Ukhaa Tolgod locality of the Djadokhta Formation, in a sublocality known as Ankylosaur Flats. This new specimen was labelled under the specimen number IGM 100/979 and includes a partial skeleton comprising some ribs and partial limbs but lacking the skull, neck and tail. It was found in a nesting pose, sitting atop a nest of elongatoolithid eggs with folded forelimbs and crouched hindlimbs. Similar to the embryonic specimen, IGM 100/979 was considered to be an indeterminate oviraptorid closely related to Oviraptor. The specimen shortly became famous and was nicknamed as "Big Mama" by The New York Times press. A larger and more complete specimen, catalogued as IGM 100/978, was found in 1994 also from the Ankylosaur Flats sublocality by the American Museum–Mongolian Academy of Sciences field expeditions. The specimen was unearthed as a single individual not associated with eggs, and it is represented by a nearly complete skeleton including the skull and much of the postcranial elements. However, it was initially identified as a specimen of Oviraptor.

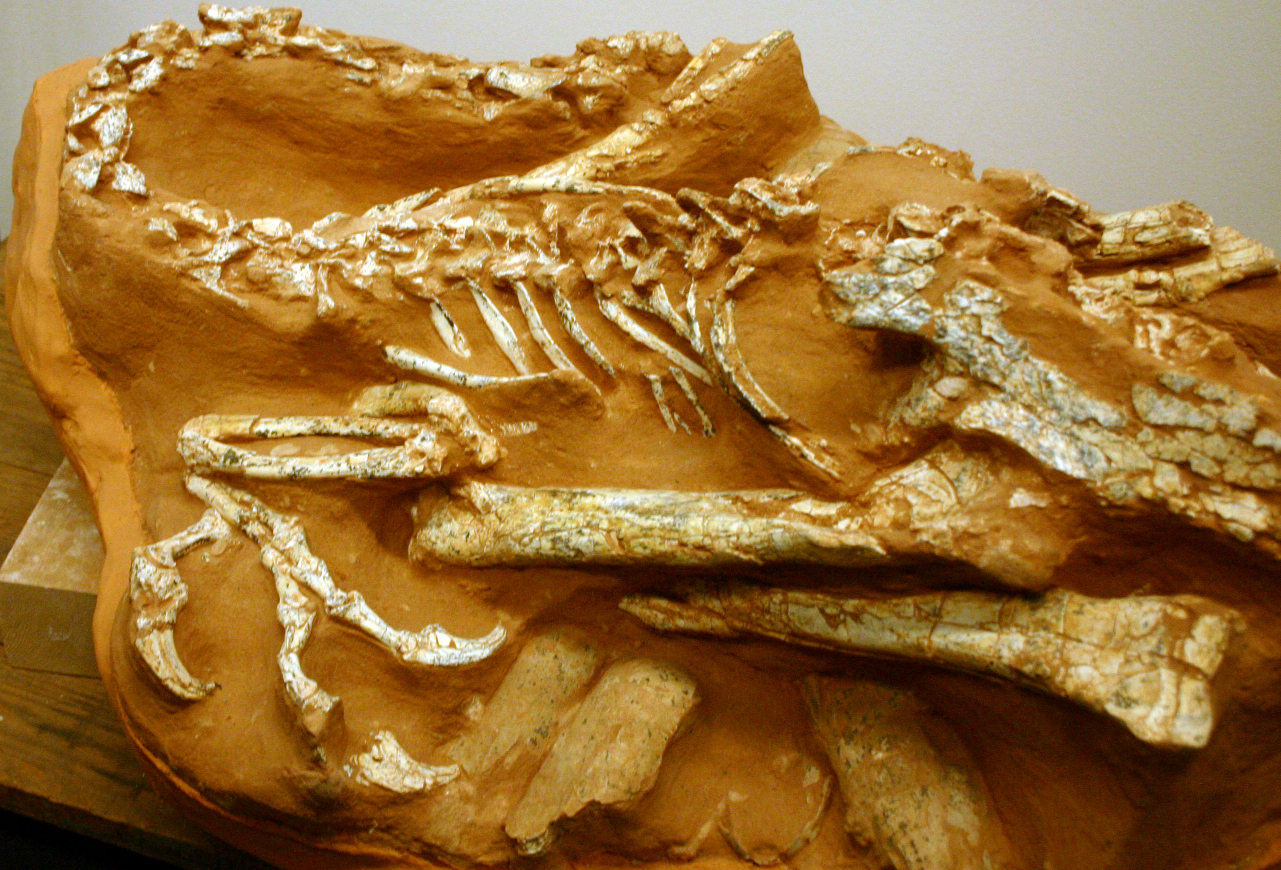
Citipati specimen IGM 100/1004, also known as "Big Auntie"

In 1995, the Mongolian Academy of Sciences-American Museum of Natural History expedition discovered a second nesting oviraptorid specimen from the Ukhaa Tolgod locality, in a region called Camel's Humps, at the Death Row sublocality. This new specimen was labelled as IGM 100/1004 and nicknamed "Big Auntie". The excavation lasted several days of work and a filming crew registered some of the excavation progress through video-documentary and photography. The professional team had to remove some of the sediments surrounding the specimen as the terrain was irregular and it was too heavy to be safely transported to the escarpment. As most fossils of the Ukhaa Tolgod locality have a relatively good preservation and exposure, the lack of associated nests argues against the possibility for this sublocality to be an oviraptorid nesting site. IGM 100/1004 is slightly more complete than 100/979; it preserves the entire cervical series with the exception of the atlas and axis, dorsal vertebrae with thoracic ribs, partial limbs and some sacral vertebrae.

In 2001, the paleontologists James M. Clark, Mark A. Norell and Rinchen Barsbold named the new genus and type species Citipati osmolskae based on the now regarded holotype IGM 100/978, and referred specimens IGM 100/971 (embryo) with 100/979 ("Big Mama"). The generic name, Citipati, is formed from the Sanskrit words citi (meaning funeral pyre) and pati (meaning lord) in reference to the lord of cemeteries in the Tibetan Buddhism folklore, Citipati, which is often depicted as a humanoid skeleton. The specific name, osmolskae, is in honor to the noted Polish paleontologist Halszka Osmólska, whose work dealt extensively with Mongolian theropods.

=== Description of specimens ===
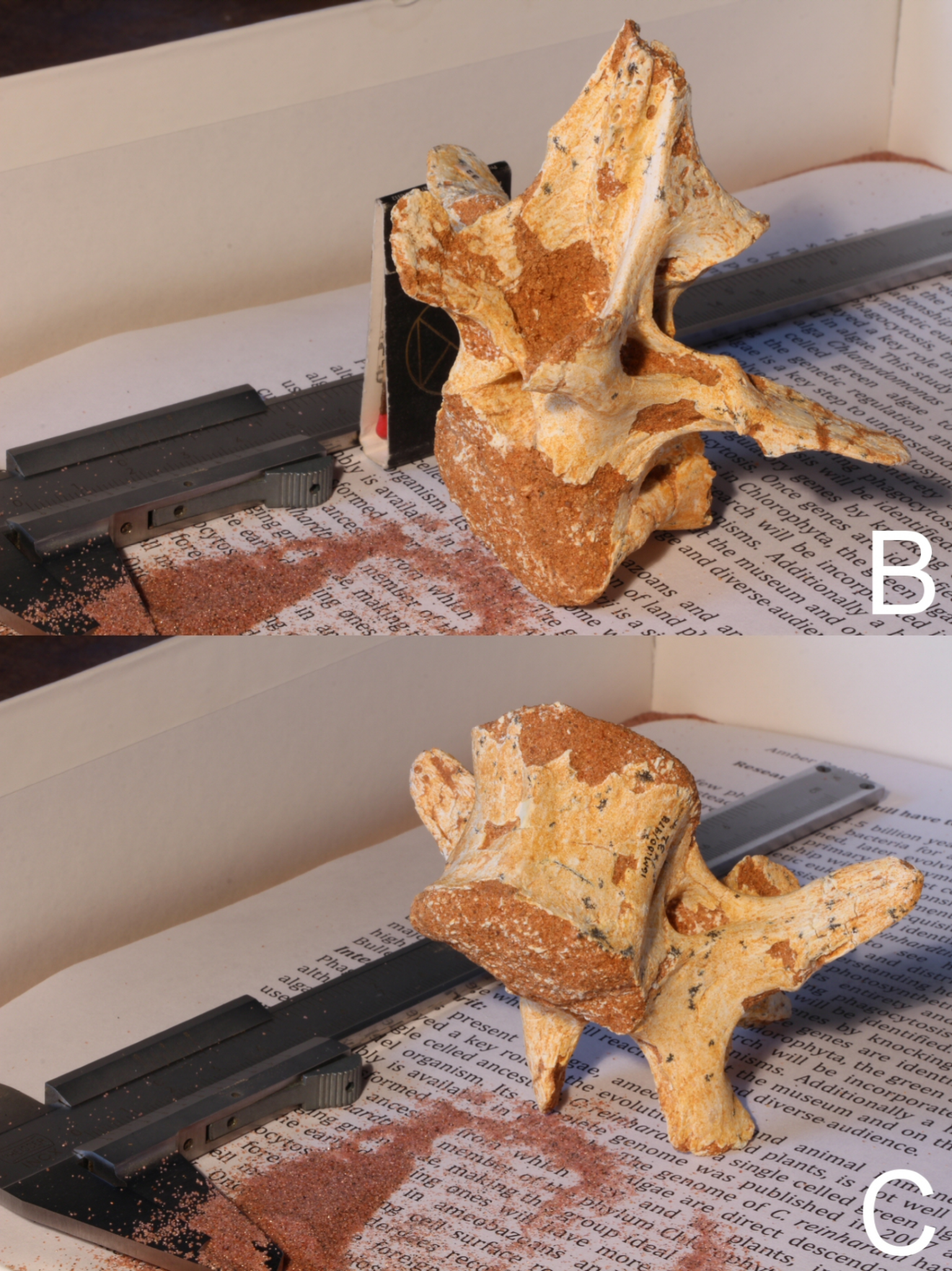
Caudal vertebra from the holotype

Though the first specimen of Citipati (IGM 100/971) was briefly reported and discussed, Norell and colleagues in 2001 provided an extensive description of this specimen. As the description was published prior to the formal naming of Citipati, Norell and team tentatively referred this small embryo to a "new large species from Ukhaa Tolgod"—in fact, later known as Citipati osmolskae—based on the shared tall premaxilla morphology among specimens. The more famous IGM 100/979 was extensively described by Clark and team in 1999, also prior to the naming of Citipati. They considered this specimen to be most similar and closely related to Oviraptor than to the other oviraptorids known at that time. Despite being discovered in 1995, the specimen IGM 100/1004 remained partially figured and largely undescribed for years until its formal referral to the taxon Citipati osmolskae in 2018 by Norell and team.

The largest and most complete specimen of Citipati is represented by the holotype IGM 100/978, however, it was preliminarily described and figured in 2001 during the naming of the taxon and during that time, the specimen had not been completely prepared. The skull anatomy of the specimen was later described by Clark and colleagues in 2002, the furcula morphology in 2009 by Sterling J. Nesbitt with team, and the caudal vertebrae by W. Scott Persons and colleagues in 2014 who noted the presence of a pygostyle. Subsequent descriptions have been published in 2018 by Norell and team describing and illustrating some cervical vertebrae and uncinate processes, and Amy M. Balanoff and colleagues describing the endocranium anatomy. In 2003 Amy Davidson described the process in which the holotype was prepared, later supplemental by Christina Bisulca and team in 2009 describing conservation treatments of broken bones.

=== Zamyn Khondt oviraptorid ===
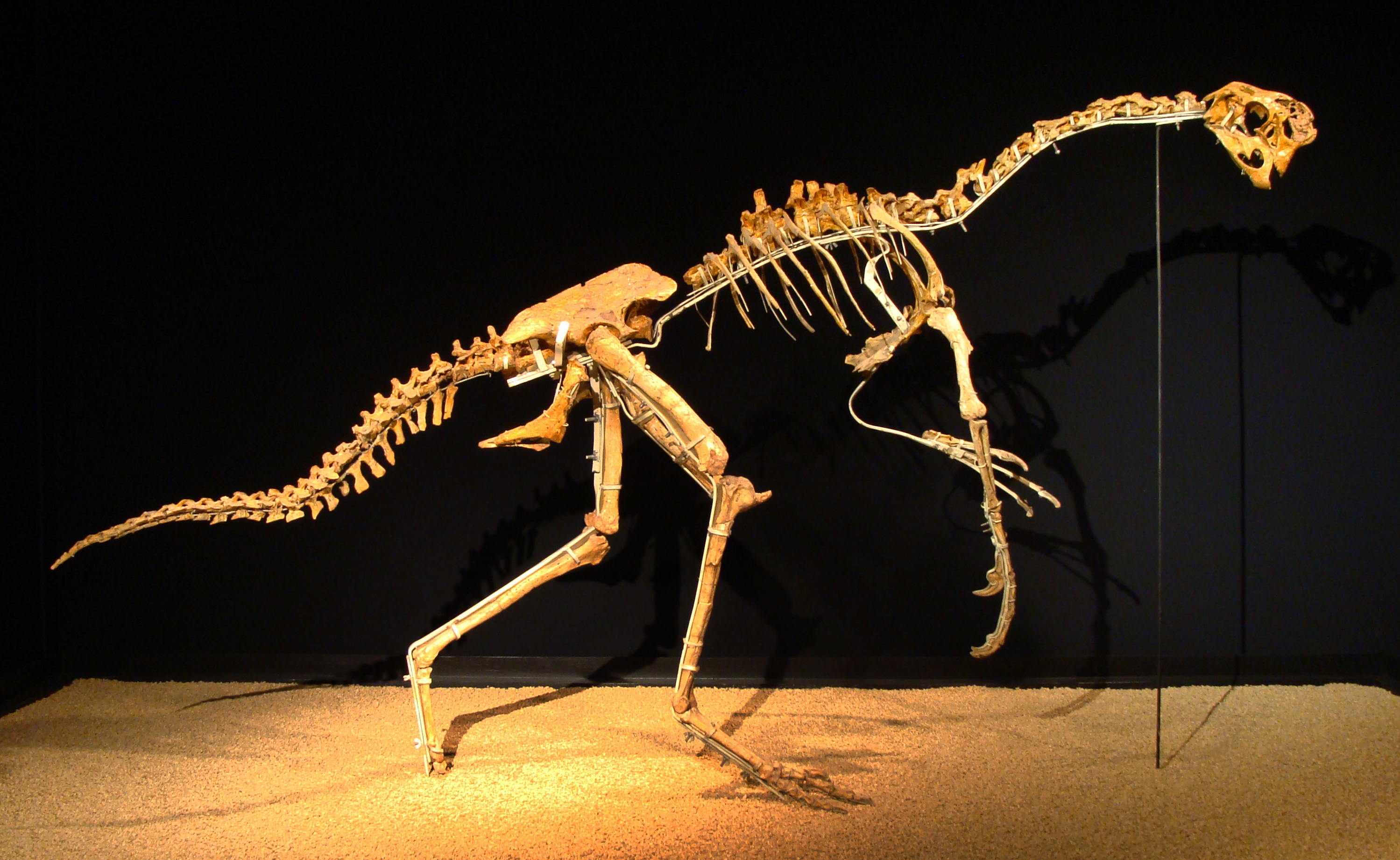
Mounted IGM 100/42; this specimen has been largely used as a reference for Oviraptor and could represent a second species of Citipati

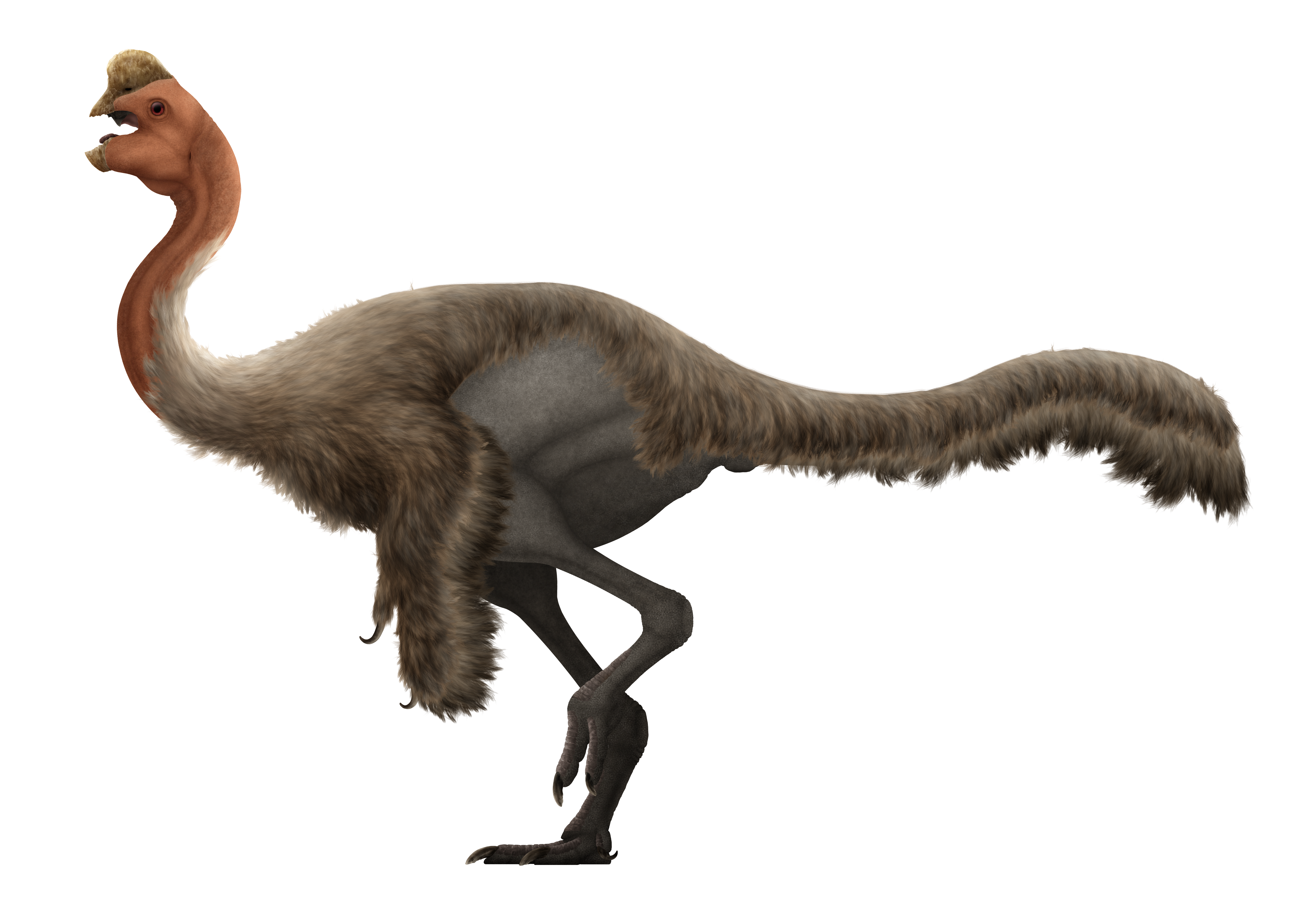
Life restoration of the Zamyn Khondt oviraptorid

The Zamyn Khondt oviraptorid is a well-known oviraptorid represented by a single and rather complete specimen (IGM 100/42) collected from the Zamyn Khondt (also spelled as Dzamin Khond) locality of the Djadokhta Formation. Since the type skull and body remains of Oviraptor are crushed and partially preserved, the Zamyn Khondt oviraptorid had become the quintessential depiction of the former, even appearing in scientific literature with the label Oviraptor philoceratops.

Clark with team have pointed out that this distinctive-looking, tall-crested oviraptorid has more features of the skull in common with Citipati than it does with Oviraptor. Though being different in the crest shape of the skull, the Zamyn Khondt oviraptorid is similar to Citipati in the shape of the narial region and premaxilla morphology. They considered this oviraptorid to belong to the genus, however, they could neither confirm nor disregard that this specimen represents a second species of Citipati. Lü Junchang and colleagues in 2004 found this specimen to be closely related to Oviraptor, Phil Senter with team in 2007 placed it close to neither genus, and in 2020 Gregory F. Funston and colleagues found it to be the sister taxon of Citipati.

== Description ==
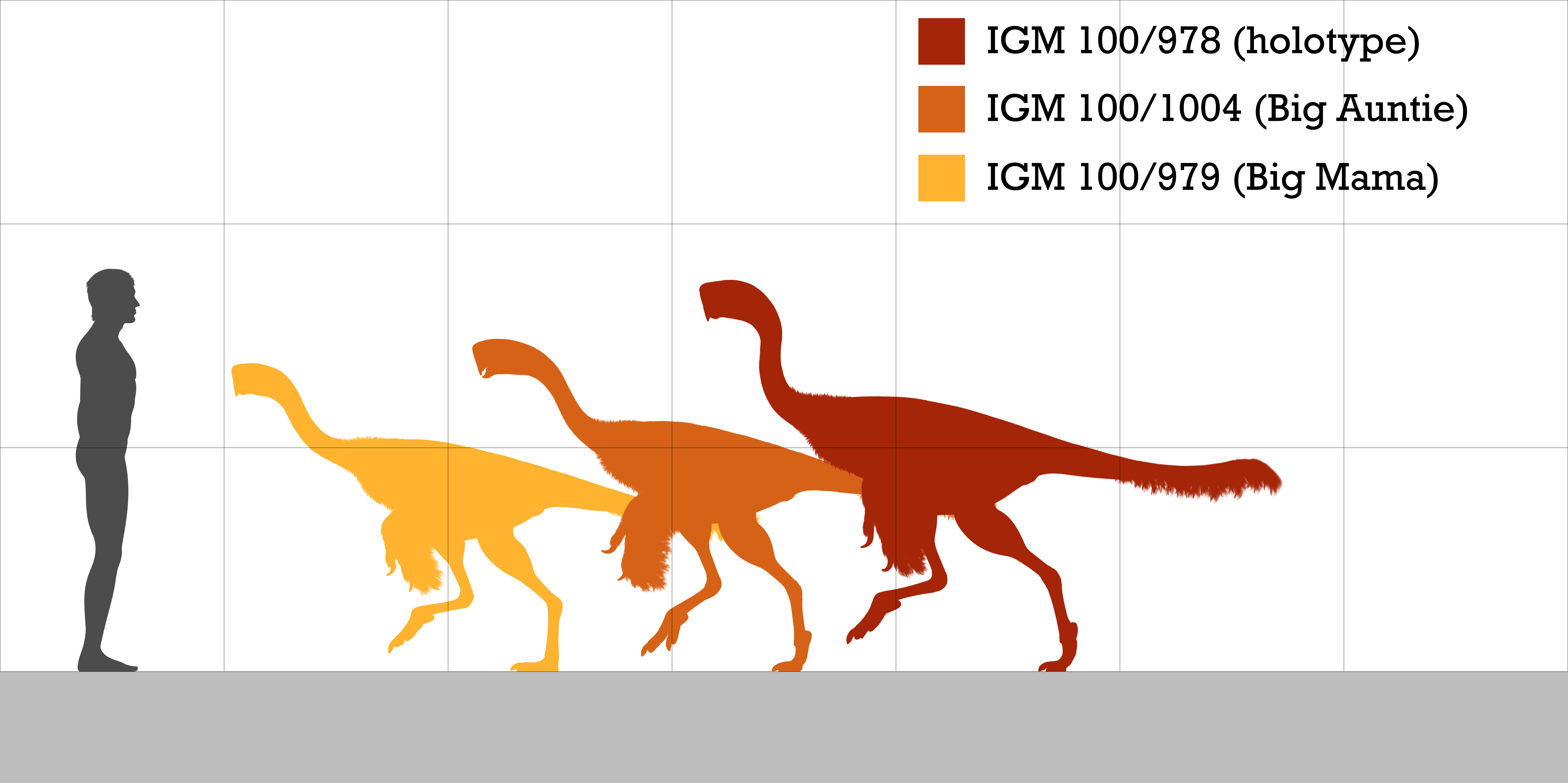
Size comparison of three specimens of Citipati (holotype, Big Auntie and Big Mama)

Citipati was a large-bodied oviraptorid, with the largest individuals being emu-sized animals; it has been estimated at 2.5–2.9 m (8.2–9.5 ft) in length with a weight between 75–110 kg (165–243 lb), and was one of the largest known oviraptorosaurs until the description of Gigantoraptor. Based on their humeral lengths, IGM 100/1004 was about 11% larger than IGM 100/979. Like other oviraptorids, Citipati had an unusually long neck and shortened tail compared to most other theropods. The presence of a pygostyle and the brooding pose in specimens of Citipati indicate the presence of large wing and tail feathers, and plumage. Other oviraptorids and oviraptorosaurs are also known to have been feathered. The evidence of pisiform bone has also been reported in a specimen referred to Citipati cf. osmolskae (IGM 100/3621) along with the indeterminate troodontid specimen (IGM 100/3686), providing evidence of replacement of the ulnare by the pisiform before the origin of birds, and close to the origins of flight in theropods.

=== Skull ===
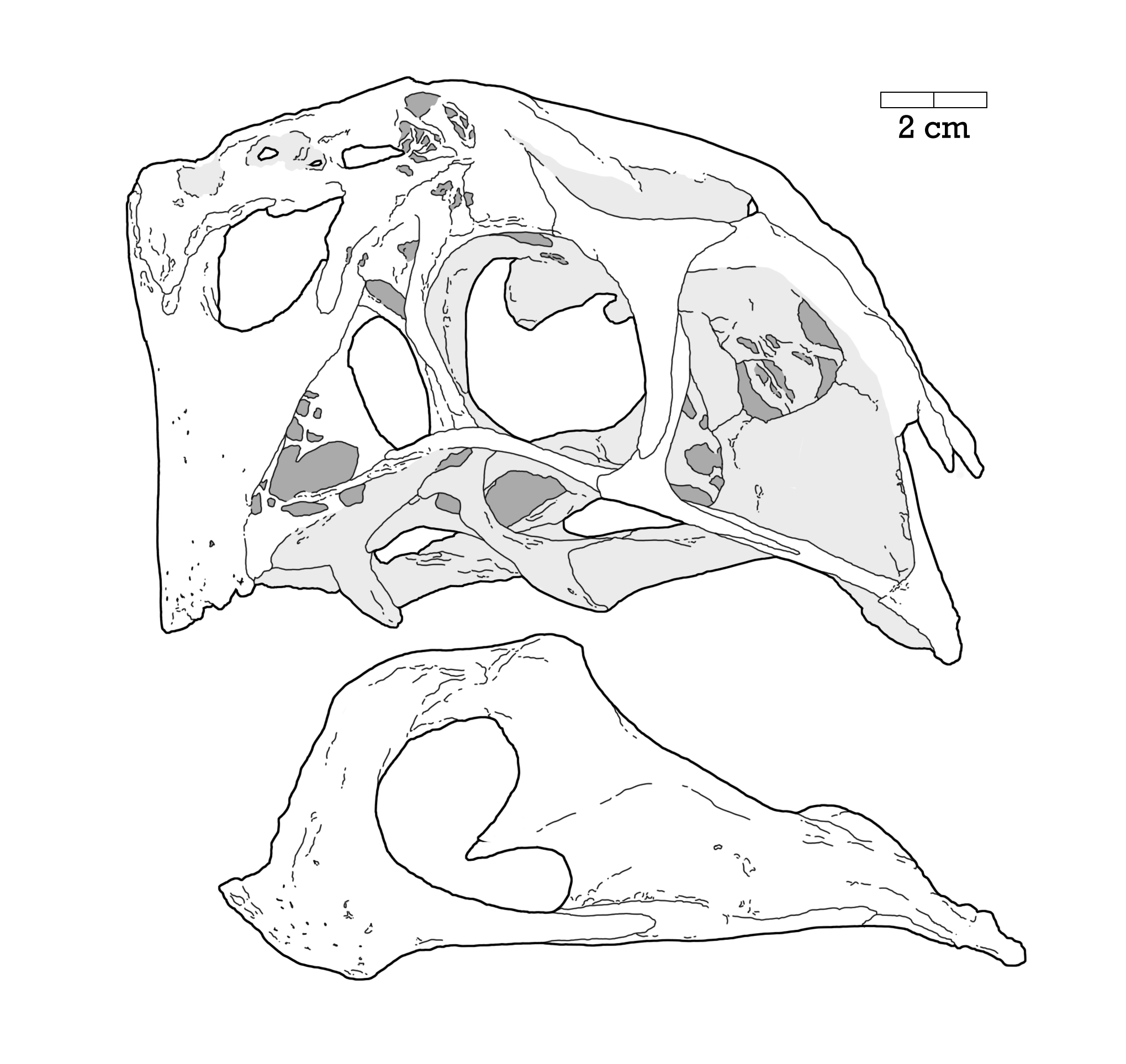
Line drawing of the holotype skull

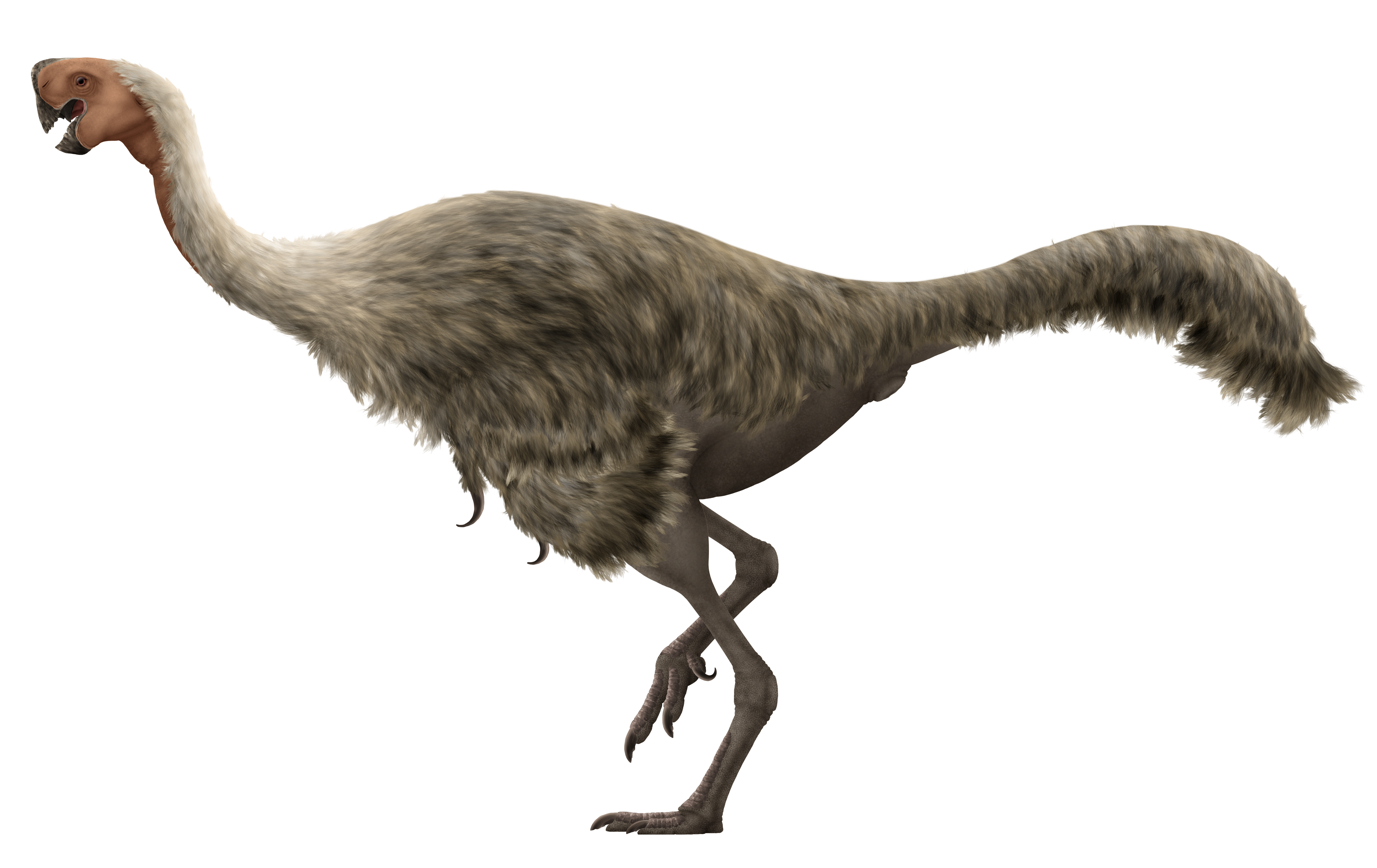
Life restoration

Its skull was unusually short and highly pneumatized (riddled with air-spaced openings), ending in a stout, toothless beak. Perhaps the most distinctive feature of Citipati was its tall crest, superficially similar to that of a modern cassowary. The crest was relatively low in C. osmolskae formed by the premaxilla and nasal bones of the skull, with a nearly vertical front margin grading into the beak. In contrast, the crest of IGM 100/42 was taller with a prominent notch in the front margin, creating a squared appearance.

== Classification ==
Citipati is often referred to the subfamily Oviraptorinae along with Oviraptor. However, in 2020, Gregory F. Funston and colleagues found Oviraptor to be more basal, so they named a new subfamily Citipatiinae. The cladogram below follows their analysis:

- Oviraptoridae
  - unnamed
    Nankangia
  - unnamed
    - Oviraptor
    - unnamed
      - Yulong
      - unnamed
        - Citipatiinae
          - Wulatelong
          - unnamed
            - unnamed
              - Rinchenia
              - Tongtianlong
            - unnamed
              - Ganzhousaurus
              - unnamed
                - unnamed
                  - Citipati
                  - Zamyn Khondt oviraptorid
                - unnamed
                  - Huanansaurus
                  - Corythoraptor
        - Heyuanninae
          - Shixinggia
          - unnamed
            - Khaan
            - unnamed
              - Conchoraptor
              - unnamed
                - Machairasaurus
                - unnamed
                  - unnamed
                    - Nemegtomaia
                    - unnamed
                      - Heyuannia huangi
                      - Heyuannia yanshini
                  - unnamed
                    - unnamed
                      - Banji
                      - unnamed
                        - Jiangxisaurus
                        - Oksoko

== Paleobiology ==
=== Feeding mechanics ===
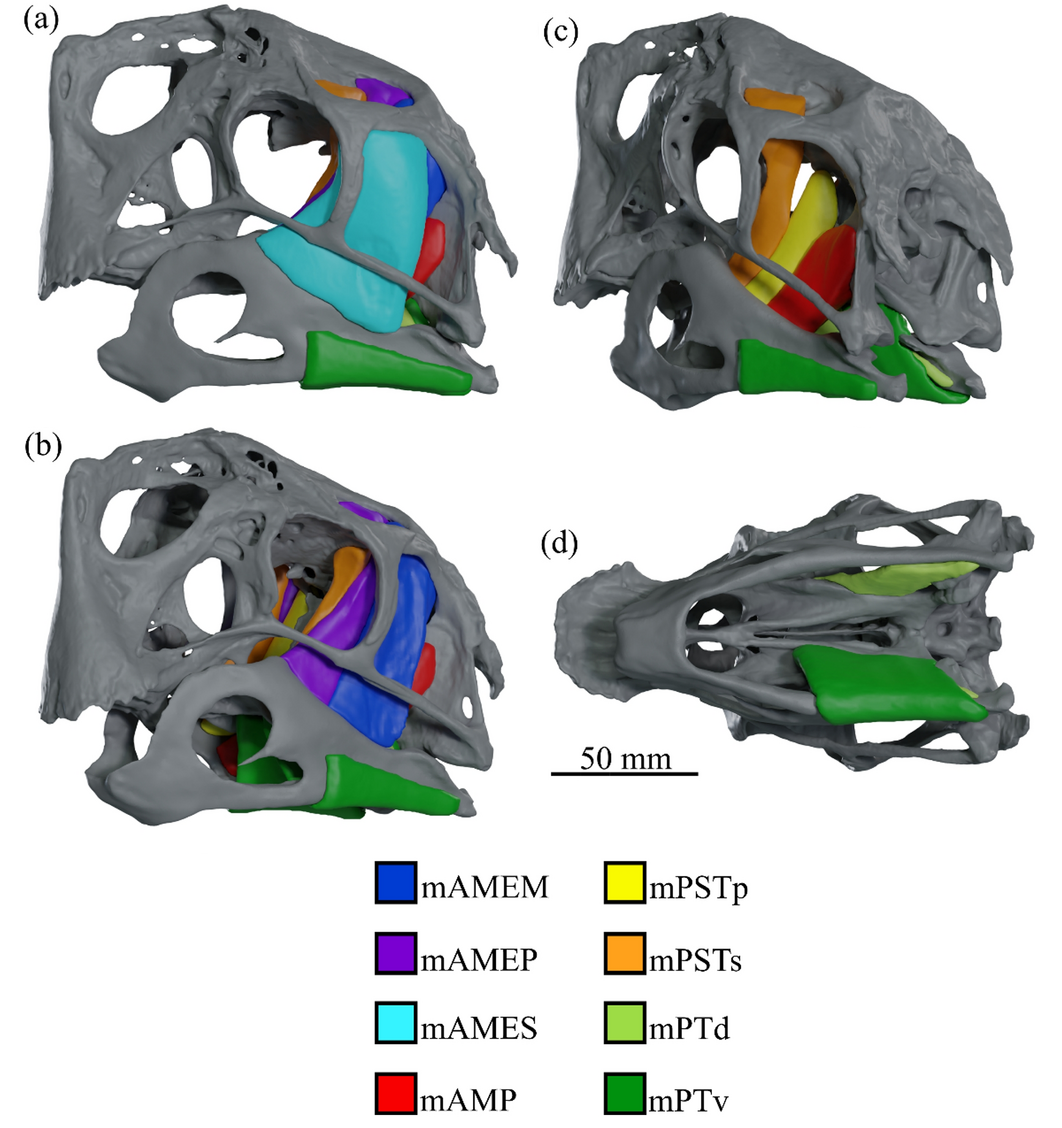
Reconstructed jaw musculature of Citipati

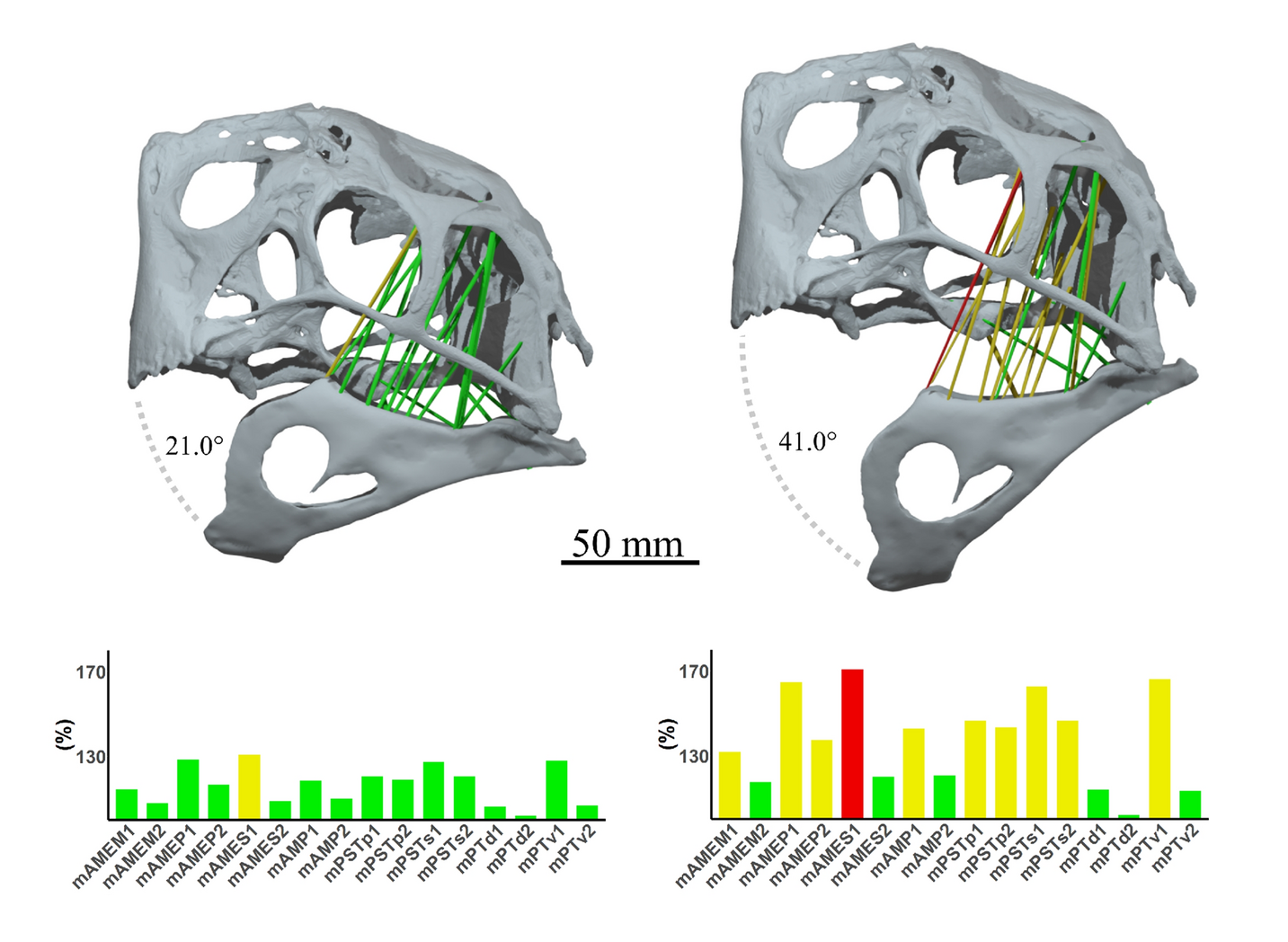
Optimal (left) and maximum (right) jaw gapes of Citipati

A 2022 study of the bite force of Citipati and comparisons with other oviraptorosaurs such as Incisivosaurus, Khaan, and Conchoraptor suggests that Citipati had a very strong bite force, scored between 349.3 N and 499.0 N. The moderate jaw gape seen in oviraptorosaurs is indicative of herbivory in the majority of the group, but it is clear they were likely feeding on much tougher vegetation than other herbivorous theropods in their environment, such as ornithomimosaurs and therizinosaurs were able to. The examinations suggest oviraptorosaurs may have been powerful-biting generalists or specialists that partook of niche partitioning both in body size and jaw function. Of the oviraptorids examined in this study, Citipati had one of the most powerful bites, but its biting mechanics were unique among the oviraptorosaurs investigated.

=== Reproduction ===
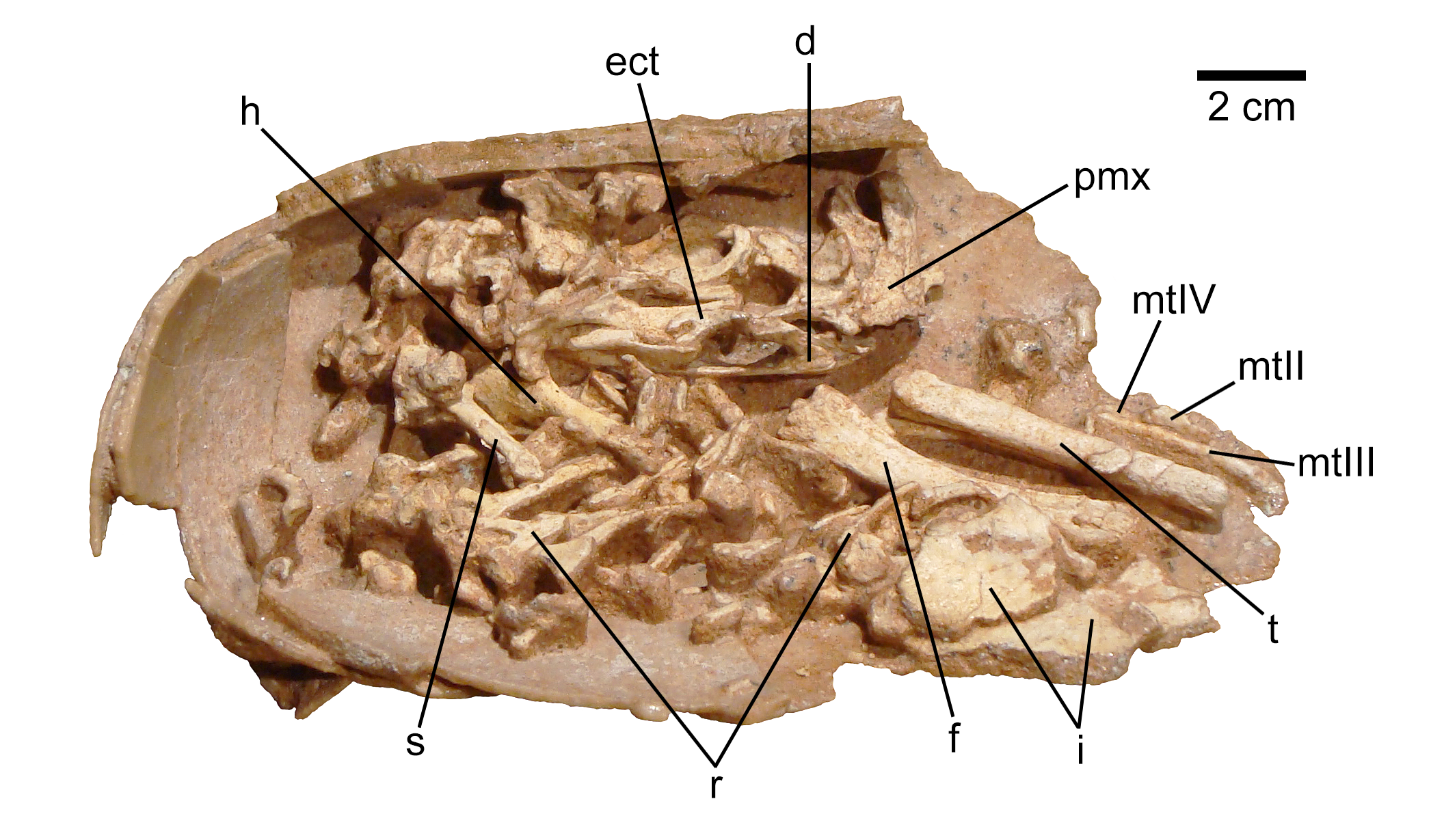
Labelled Citipati embryo IGM 100/971

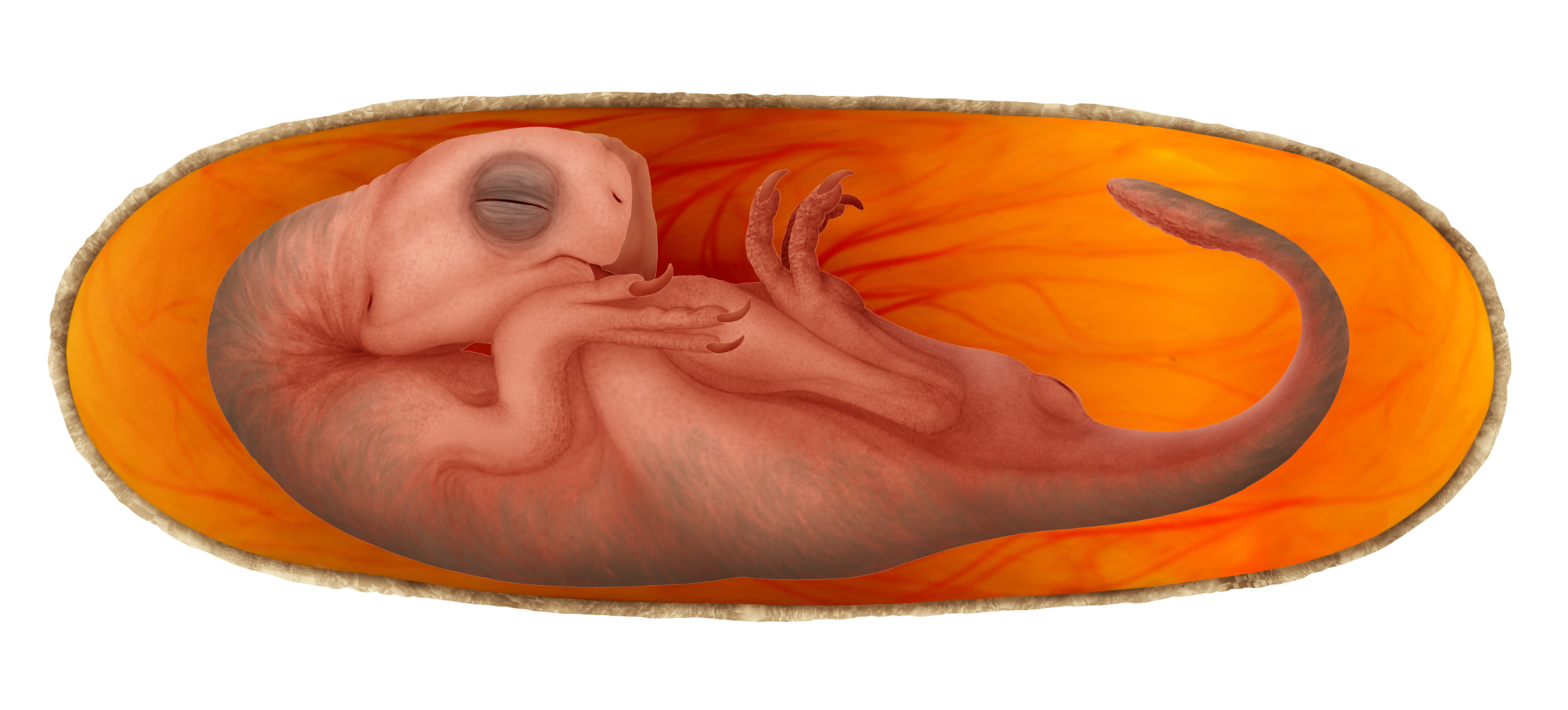
Life restoration of IGM 100/971

The embryo-bearing egg was otherwise identical to other oviraptorid eggs in shell structure and was found in an isolated nest, again arranged in a circular pattern. Two skulls (IGM 100/972 and IGM 100/974) that might belong to very young or embryonic Byronosaurus were found associated with the same nest as the first Citipati embryo. It is possible that these tiny troodontids were preyed upon by the Citipati to feed its nest. Alternately, Mark Norell suggested that the juvenile troodonts were raiding the Citipati nest, or even that an adult Byronosaurus had laid eggs in a Citipati nest as an act of nest parasitism. However, Norell later informally suggested that these skulls were likely washed from one nest to another, and other researchers have stated that the skulls probably do not belong to Byronosaurus based on the differences in morphology.

Although fossilized dinosaur eggs are rare, Citipati eggs and oviraptorid eggs in general, are relatively well known. Along with the two known nesting specimens, dozens of isolated oviraptorid nests have been uncovered in the Gobi Desert. Citipati eggs are elongatoolithid, which are shaped like elongated ovals and resemble the eggs of ratites in texture and shell structure. In the nest, Citipati eggs are typically arranged in concentric circles of up to three layers, and a complete clutch may have consisted of as many of 22 eggs. The eggs of Citipati are the largest known definitive oviraptorid eggs, at 18 cm. In contrast, eggs associated with Oviraptor are only up to 14 cm long.

The two nesting specimens of Citipati are situated on top of egg clutches, with their limbs spread symmetrically on each side of the nest, front limbs covering the nest perimeter. This brooding posture is found today only in birds and supports a behavioral link between birds and theropod dinosaurs. The nesting position of Citipati also supports the hypothesis that it and other oviraptorids had feathered forelimbs. Thomas P. Hopp and Mark J. Orsen in 2004 analyzed the brooding behavior of extinct and extant dinosaur species, including oviraptorids, in order to evaluate the reason for the elongation and development of wing and tail feathers. Given that IGM 100/979 was found in a very avian-like posture, with the forelimbs in a near-folded posture and the pectoral region, belly, and feet in contact with the eggs, Hopp and Orsen indicated that long pennaceous feathers and a feather covering were most likely present in life. The "wings" and tail of oviraptorids would have granted protection for the eggs and hatchlings against climate factors like the sunlight, wind, and rainfalls. However, the arms of this specimen were not extremely folded as in some modern birds, instead, they are more extended resembling the style of large flightless birds like the ostrich. The extended position of the arm is also similar to the brooding behavior of this bird, which is known to nest in large clutches like oviraptorids. Based on the forelimb position of nesting oviraptorids, Hopp and Orsen proposed brooding as the ancestral reason behind wing and tail feather elongation, as there was a greater need to provide optimal protection for eggs and juveniles.

In 2014, W. Scott Persons and colleagues suggested that oviraptorosaurs were secondarily flightless and several of the traits in their tails may indicate a propensity for display behaviour, such as courtship display. The tail of several oviraptorosaurs and oviraptorids ended in pygostyles, a bony structure at the end of the tail that, at least in modern birds, is used to support a feather fan. Furthermore, the tail was notably muscular and had a pronounced flexibility, which may have aided in courtship movements.

=== Paleopathology ===
Clark and colleagues in 1999 during the description of "Big Mama" noted that the right ulna was badly broken but healed, leaving a prominent callus and possible elongated groove over the injury. As the ulna features positive signs of healing, in 2019 Leas Hearn and team suggested that this individual managed to survive an injury that would have interfered with foraging for several weeks in order to lay and incubate its nest.

In 2002 Clark with team reported a small notch preserved on the right jugal, just beneath the orbit, of the holotype skull of Citipati. This anomaly was likely produced by external damage, leaving a small injury.

== Paleoenvironment ==
Citipati is vastly known from the Ukhaa Tolgod locality of the Djadokhta Formation, which is dated around 71 million to 75 million years ago (Late Cretaceous). This formation is separated into a lower Bayn Dzak Member and upper Turgrugyin Member, of which the Ukhaa Tolgod locality belongs to the former. Characteristic lithology across the formation include reddish-orange and pale orange to light gray, medium to fine-grained sands and sandstones, and caliche, with better exposures represented at Ukhaa Tolgod. The settings in which Citipati and associated paleofauna lived are interpreted as large dune fields/sand dunes and several short-lived water bodies with arid to semiarid climates. Other dinosaurs known from Ukhaa Tolgod include alvarezsaurids Kol and Shuvuuia; ankylosaurid Minotaurasaurus; birds Apsaravis and Gobipteryx; dromaeosaurid Tsaagan; fellow oviraptorid Khaan; troodontids Almas and Byronosaurus; and an undescribed protoceratopsid closely related to Protoceratops.

== See also ==
- Timeline of oviraptorosaur research
