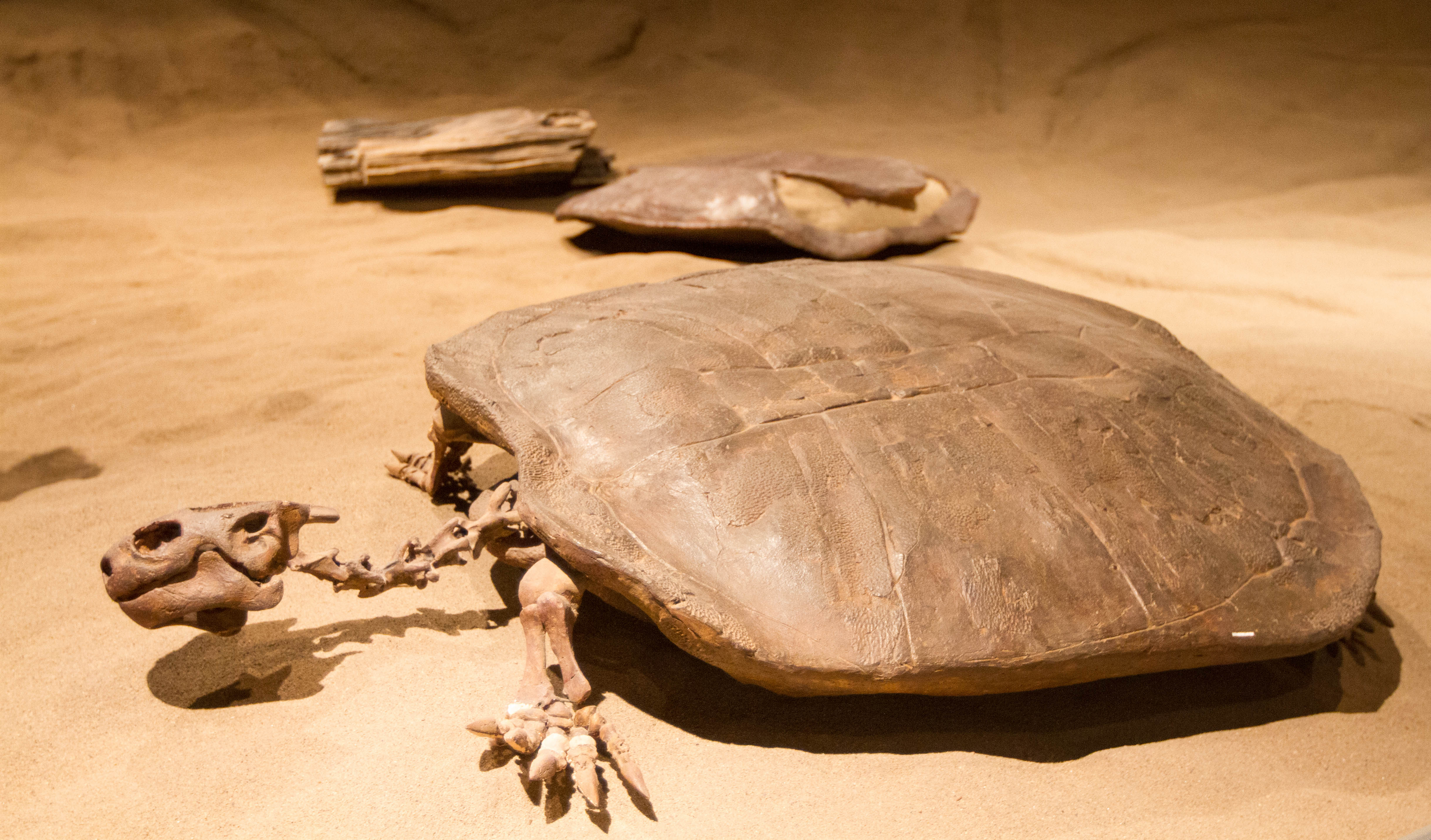
- B. variolosa skeleton, Royal Tyrrell Museum

Scientific classification
- Kingdom: Animalia
- Phylum: Chordata
- Class: Reptilia
- Order: Testudines
- Suborder: Cryptodira
- Family: †Nanhsiungchelyidae
- Genus: †Basilemys; Hay 1902

Type species
- †Basilemys variolosa (Cope, 1876)

Species
- †B. gaffneyi Sullivan et al. 2012; †B. morrinensis Mallon & Brinkman 2018; †B. praeclara Hay 1911; †B. sinuosa Riggs 1906; †B. variolosa (Cope 1876) (type)

= Basilemys =

Basilemys Temporal range: Campanian-Maastrichtian ~84–66 Ma

Extinct genus of turtles

Basilemys ("king turtle" in Greek) is a large, terrestrial nanhsiungchelyid turtle from the Upper Cretaceous of North and Central America. Most fossils of Basilemys have been found in rocks dating to the Campanian and Maastrichtian subdivisions of the Late Cretaceous and is considered to be the largest terrestrial turtle of its time. In an analysis made by Sukhanov et al. on a nansiunghelyid turtle from the Upper Cretaceous of Mongolia, it was demonstrated that Asian nanhsiungchelyids gave rise to the North American nanhsiungchelyids.

Amongst nanhsiungchelyids, Basilemys is considered to be most similar to tortoises. Many paleontologists have described the behaviors of Basilemys to likely be comparable to that of tortoises, due to living in terrestrial habitats and consuming tough plants. Basilemys is easily distinguishable from other fossil turtles due to how thick its shell is, the intricate sculpture of rows of triangular tubercles separated by pits, and its reduced inframarginal scales. The fossil record is abundant with material from the shell, but cranial and cervical material is quite rare for Basilemys.

== Geological information and discovery ==
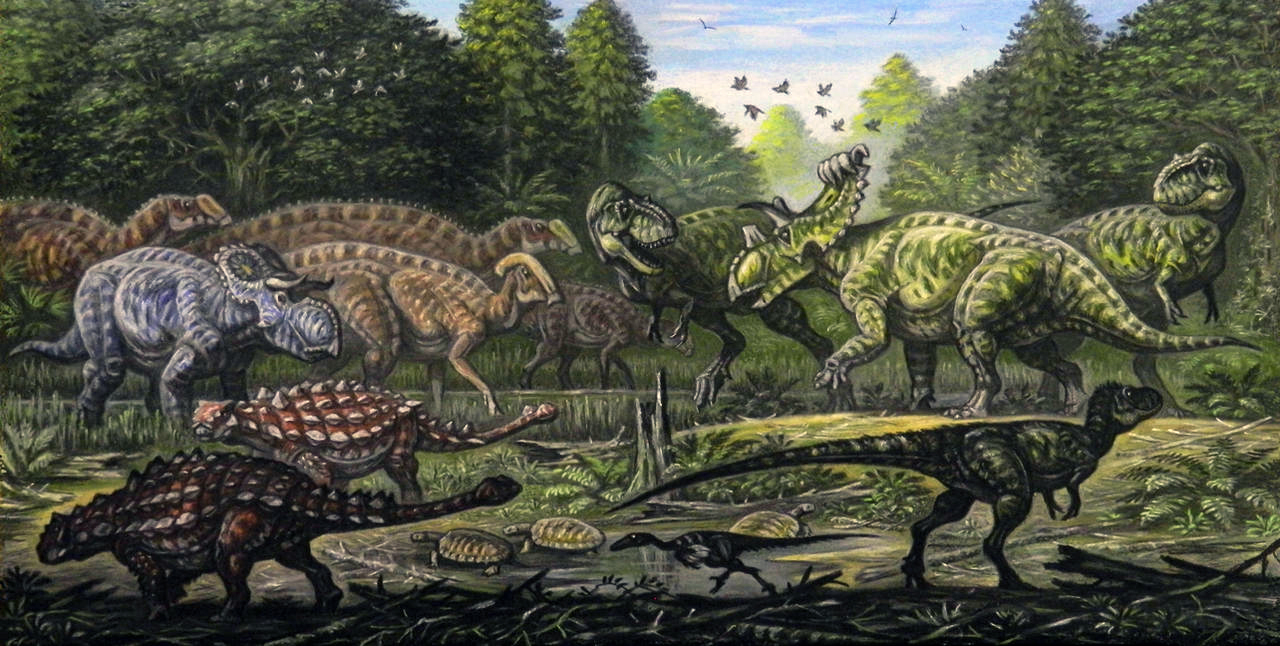
Restoration of Basilemys (lower middle) among other animals of the Kaiparowits Formation

Turtles were prominent members of the Upper Cretaceous and thus, their specimens found throughout North America are useful in defining biogeographic patterns. In 1924, a partial skeleton and crushed skull of Basilemys was collected by C.M. Sternberg from the Horseshoe Canyon Formation. However, this specimen was poorly preserved and information of the skull could not be analyzed. In another part of Canada, a Basilemys specimen from the Frenchman Formation of Saskatchewan retained most of the neck and cranial fragments. Most of the well-preserved specimens of Basilemys are of the carapace, the hard upper shell of a turtle. Apart from the type species, Basilemys variolosa, five other species have been described to date. These include B. gaffneyi, B. morrinensis, B. nobilis, B. praeclara and B. sinuosa. In 2018, a nearly complete shell of B. morrinensis was found from the Horseshoe Canyon Formation of Alberta. Basilemys specimens have also been found from the Oldman Formation and Dinosaur Park Formation.

Other shell fragments of Basilemys have been found in the El Gallo Formation, located in Baja California. Like the Horseshoe Canyon Formation and the Frenchman Formation, the El Gallo Formation is a rich fossiliferous geological unit. The three shell fragments that were found in the El Gallo Formation represent the first record of Basilemys from the Upper Cretaceous of Mexico. Basilemys remains have also been recovered from the Aguja Formation, which stretches from Texas to Mexico. Shell fragments of Basilemys discovered from this formation are similar to those found in the El Gallo Formation, identified by shallow pits and small pyramidal elevations on the carapace. Indeterminate species of Basilemys have been discovered from older deposits including the Milk River Formation (Santonian) in Alberta, the John Henry Member of the Straight Cliffs Formation (Coniacian) in Utah, and the Frontier Formation (Turonian–Coniacian boundary) in Montana.

== Description and paleobiology ==
=== Skull ===
The proportions of Basilemys' skull are very similar to those of Adocus, Baptemys and Zangerlia. These genera have cheek and temporal regions that are deeply emarginated. The cheek emargination is short and deep and reaches above the level of the ventral edge of the orbit. The ventro-posterior corner of Basilemys' skull lacks a posterior projection into the temporal emargination which is unlike the genus Adocus. Additionally, the temporal emargination of Basilemys projects forward and reaches the anterior edge of the cheek emargination. Near the center of individual bones, the skull roof of Basilemys is developed and there are striations that extend outwards from these central regions. In contrast, the skull roof of the related Nanhsiungchelys is covered by sculpture that matches the carapace.

Resembling both Adocus and Zangerlia, Basilemys has a small external narial opening. Basilemys has a deep premaxillary border that is just below the external narial opening. In addition, the premaxillae of Basilemys are paired instead of fused to form a single element like in the Trionychia superfamily. Similar to other trionychoids, Basilemys' orbits have large openings. At the antero-ventral edge of the orbit, a groove on the external surface of the maxilla borders it. The orbit is also extensively floored by the palate which is a condition that is seen in Adocus, Baptemys, and Dermatemys.

The triturating surface of the maxilla is visible on both sides of the skull of Basilemys and has a well developed maxillary tooth. The tooth is elongated and has a blade-like structure, bordering a deep, circular cavity medially. A deep labial ridge is also present. The lower jaw of Basilemys is short and deep, with a sharp symphyseal hook is present on the lower jaw. The coronoid process of Basilemys is low and is located near the posterior end of the jaw.

Basilemys shares some traits with another nanhsiunchelyid, Zangerlia, which is similar to Basilemys in, for example, skull proportions. However, Basilemys has a more complex triturating surface that includes well-defined pockets on the dentary, and it also has tooth-like projections on the triturating surface of the maxilla.

=== Carapace and plastron ===
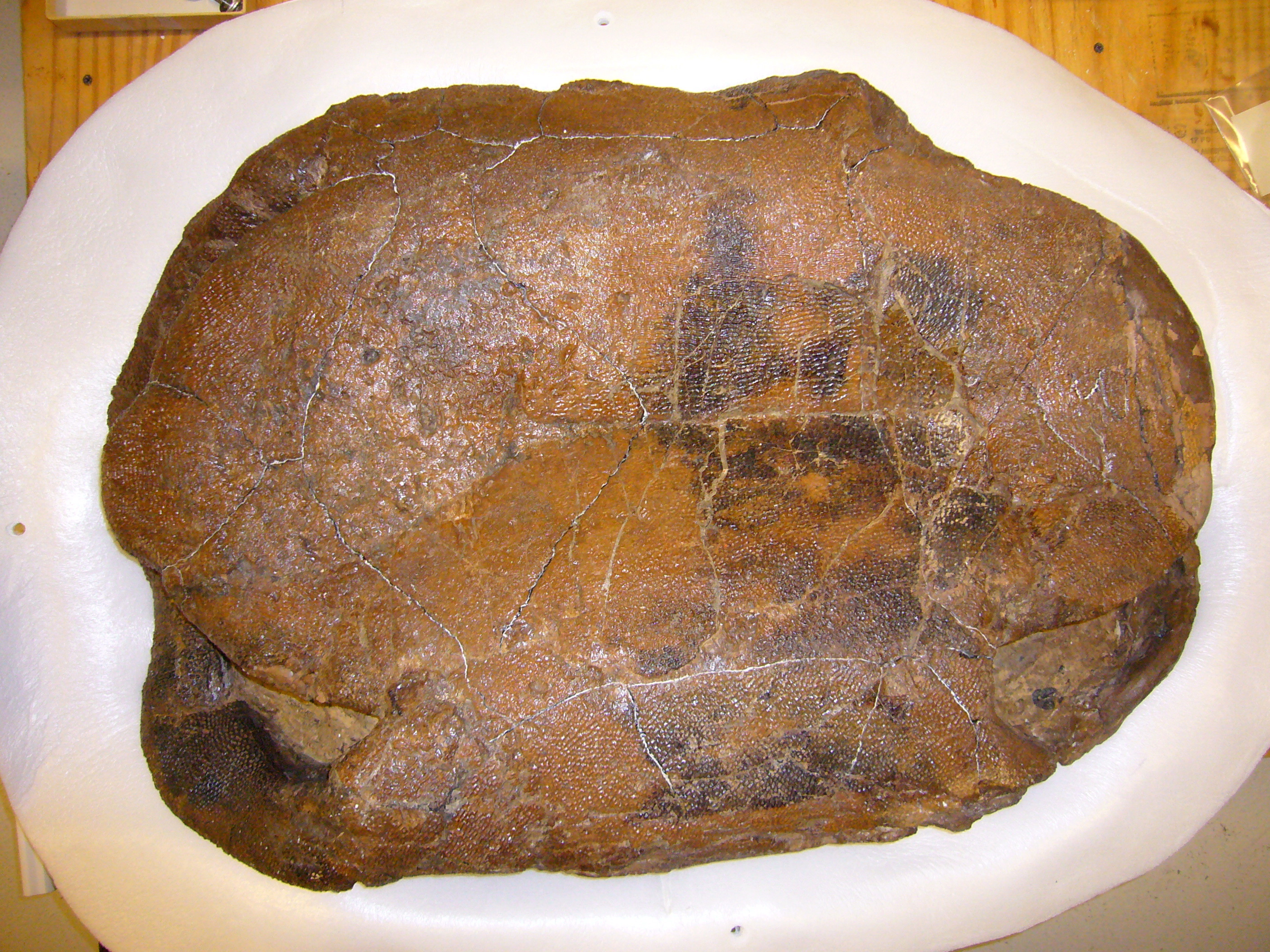
Underside of B. gaffneyi shell

Turtle shells are a key feature in the identification and differentiation of turtles. The surface texture of a Basilemys carapace consists of many small, shallow pits that are arranged in a chain-link pattern. These shallow pits are bordered by low, tetrahedal protrusions. In Nanhsiungchelys, the pits are arranged more tightly and are in transverse rows over the costals, which heavily contrasts the arrangement seen in Basilemys. The pattern of the carapace in Basilemys can be described as being nearly isotropic.

The researchers who found the carapace of B. morrinensis from the Horseshoe Canyon Formation were able to reconstruct it through drawings and distinguish the various features of the carapace. The midline of the carapace consists of vertebral scales. On the lateral sides of the vertebral scales, there are costals and pleural scales that make up another portion of the carapace. The borders of the carapace are made up of peripheral and marginal scales. The pygal bone sits at the posterior end of the shell, and the suprapygal sits right above it.

Basilemys' plastron is octagonal and elongated. Like the carapace, the plastron is made up of many bony elements, and the plastron can be divided into five distinct parts. At the anterior end of the plastron, the first part is the epiplastron, followed by the entoplastron. The next two divisions are the hyoplastron and the hypoplastron; from reconstructed images of the plastron of B. morrinensis, the hyoplastron and hypoplastron appear to be the largest sections of the plastron. At the posterior end of the plastron, the last division is the xiphiplastron. The scales that make up the plastron include the humeral-, axillary-, pectoral-, abdominal-, femoral- and anal scales.

=== Histology ===
In a histological analysis of the shell bones of two groups of stem-trionychians, Adocidae and Nanhsiungchelyidae, it was found that the shell bones of the nanhsiungchelyids have a diploe structure and cortical bone layers that frame the interior cancellous bone. The osteoderms of Basilemys were found to have pronounced and elaborate sculpturing patterns. The sample from the North American Basilemys showcased a highly organized "spindle-shaped" ornamentation pattern. In addition, the sculpturing pattern of Basilemys is made of irregular grooves and pits of external bone surface which is what is typically described as the "pock-mark" surface.

== Classification ==
Based on the specimens found from the family Nanhsiungchelyidae, researchers have been able to create cladograms based on their findings. The placement of Basilemys puts it closest to the genera Nanhsiungchelys and Zangerlia. With close examination of shell histology, along with skull and neck proportions, it was determined that, of the two, Basilemys is more closely related to Zangerlia.

- Trionychoidea
  - - Adocus
    - Nanhsiungchelyidae
      - Nanhsiungchelys
      - - Basilemys
        - Zangerlia
