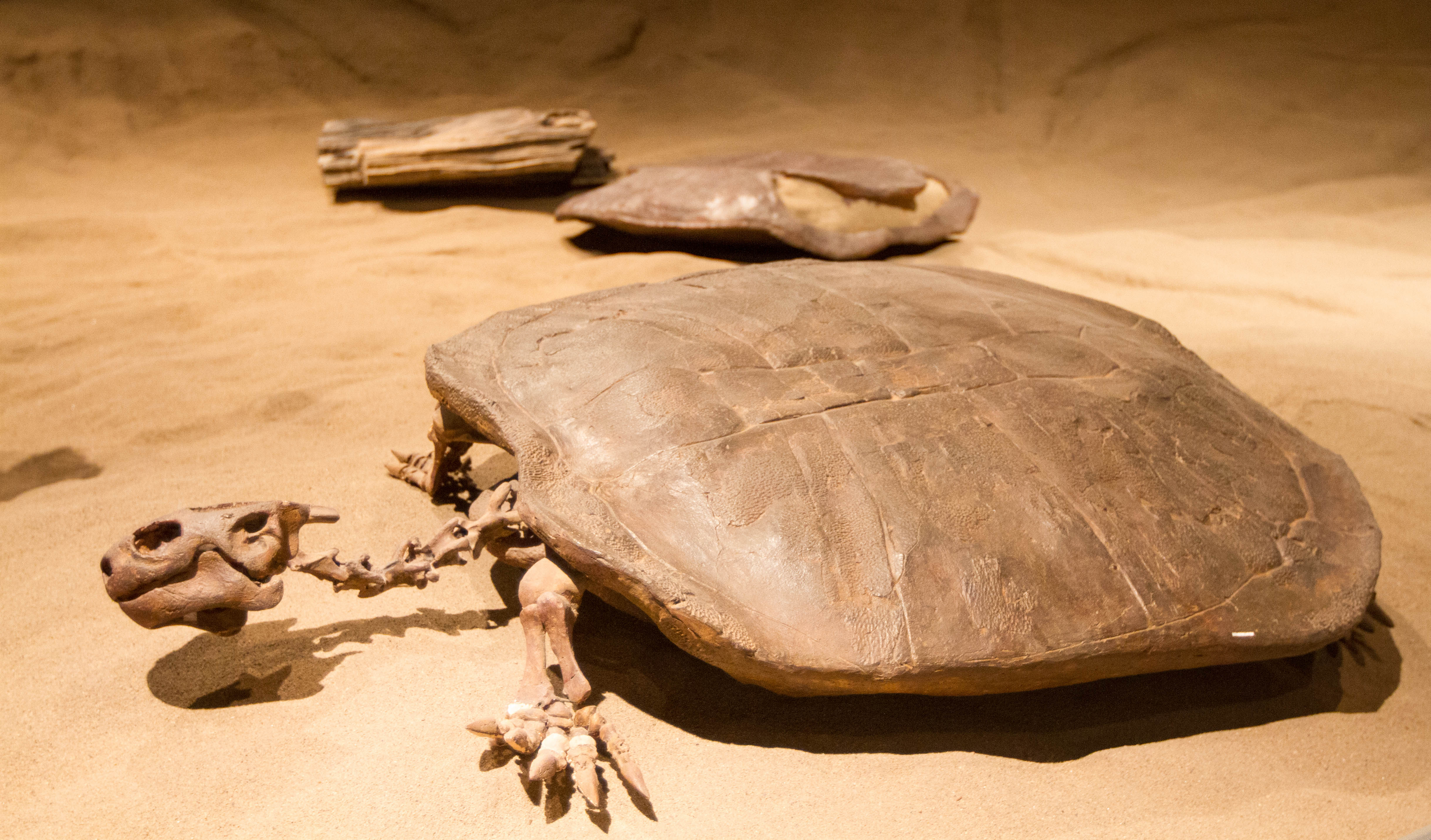
- Basilemys variolosa skeleton, Royal Tyrrell Museum

Scientific classification
- Kingdom: Animalia
- Phylum: Chordata
- Class: Reptilia
- Order: Testudines
- Suborder: Cryptodira
- Infraorder: Eucryptodira
- Family: †Nanhsiungchelyidae; Yeh, 1966

Type species
- †Nanhsiungchelys wuchingensis Yeh, 1966

Genera
- †Anomalochelys; †Basilemys; †Bulganemys; †Charitonyx; †Hanbogdemys; †Jiangxichelys; †Kharakhutulia; †Nanhsiungchelys; †Xianyuechelys; †Yuchelys; †Zangerlia

= Nanhsiungchelyidae =

Nanhsiungchelyidae Temporal range: Cretaceous

Extinct family of turtles

Nanhsiungchelyidae is an extinct family of land turtles known from Cretaceous deposits in Asia and North America. Nanhsiungchelyids were more terrestrial than many of their contemporaries, and may have gone extinct at the end of the Cretaceous as a result.

== Classification ==
The name Nanhsiungchelyidae was coined by Yeh in 1966, in the same paper in which the type genus Nanhsiungchelys was described. The name is derived from the name of the type species, with the suffix of a family, -idae, added to it.

=== Taxonomy ===
According to phylogenetic analyses, Nanhsiungchelyidae is the sister group to Adocidae, and thus both are included within the clade Adocusia. Nanhsiungchelyidae is split into two major clades, one including most of the predominantly Asian species (Jiangxichelys, Anomalochelys, etc.) and a clade including only the different species within the genus Basilemys. When looking at recent analyses, it also becomes clear that some of the species of Zangerlia might not be the same genus, as the type species confidently gets placed in a very different position than the other two valid species.

=== Phylogeny ===
Multiple phylogenetic analyses have been conducted on Nanhsiungchelyidae, but one of the most recent analyses comes from Tong & Li (2018). In this analysis, we see 13 Nanhsiungchelyid taxa represented, with Adocus used as an outgroup. Nanhsiungchelys and Anomalochelys are recovered as being in a clade together in nearly every analysis, and the same goes for the different species of Basilemys. However, the placement of the different species of Zangerlia varies a lot between publications. Before the redescription of Nanhsiungchelys in 2018, the different species of Zangerlia were often recovered as being in a clade together, on the opposite side of the Basilemys-clade. This can be seen in papers like Sullivan et al. (2013) and Sukhanov, Danilov & Syromyatnikova (2008). However, the phylogenetic analysis in Tong & Li (2018) does not recover this clade, instead spreading the different species out in the tree, recovering the type species as closer to Adocus than the others, which are placed in the clade that includes Jiangxichelys, Hanbogdemys, Anomalochelys and Nanhsiungchelys.

Phylogeny after Tong & Li (2018)

- Adocusia
  - Adocus
  - Zangerlia testudinimorpha
  - Nanhsiungchelyidae
    - - - - Jiangxichelys
            - J. neimongolensis
            - J. ganzhouensis
          - "Zangerlia" dzamynchondi
        - "Zangerlia" ukhaachelys
        - Hanbogdemys
        - - Anomalochelys
          - Nanhsiungchelys
      - Basilemys
        - B. nobilis
        - - - B. variolosa
          - - B. sinuosa
            - B. praeclara
    - Kharakhutulia
