= Cage of Eden =

Japanese manga series

- First tankōbon volume cover, featuring Rion Akagami (left) and Akira Sengoku (right)

エデンの檻 (Eden no Ori)
- Genre: Mystery; Survival; Suspense
- Manga
- Written by: Yoshinobu Yamada
- Published by: Kodansha
- English publisher: NA: Kodansha USA
- Magazine: Weekly Shōnen Magazine
- Original run: November 26, 2008 – January 23, 2013
- Volumes: 21
- icon

Cage of Eden (Japanese: エデンの檻, Hepburn: Eden no Ori) is a Japanese manga series written and illustrated by Yoshinobu Yamada. It was serialized in Kodansha's shōnen manga magazine Weekly Shōnen Magazine from November 2008 to January 2013, with its chapters collected in 21 tankōbon volumes. The series follows a group of teenage survivors of a plane crash who find themselves in a mysterious island inhabited by extinct prehistoric creatures and plants. It has been licensed for English language release in North America by Kodansha USA.

== Plot ==
Akira Sengoku and his classmates are flying back to Japan from their school trip to Guam, along with other classes from their school and various passengers. Their trip, however, takes an unexpected turn when their plane hits turbulence and crashes on a Pacific island. After recovering from being unconscious, Akira learns from his friends that they are on a mysterious island filled with extinct prehistoric creatures and plants. With nowhere to go, Akira leads a small group of survivors to find others like them. They search for a way to get home, fighting off the island's savage creatures and encountering other survivors who have gone mad. Along the way, they will discover the mysteries and secrets of the island, all whilst struggling to survive there.

== Characters ==
=== Main characters ===
Akira Sengoku (仙石 アキラ, Sengoku Akira)
Akira is a mischievous and lecherous troublemaker, considered the class delinquent. He struggles with deep-seated insecurities over his poor grades and lack of success. On the island, he demonstrates exceptional initiative and insight, gradually developing latent leadership qualities through encounters with Yarai and Ernest (Dire Wolf). He exhibits surprising physical prowess in critical moments, aided by his endurance. Unintentionally attracting the affections of several women, he becomes viewed as a natural-born playboy by his childhood friend Rion, causing her jealousy.
Rion Akagami (赤神 りおん, Akagami Rion)
Rion is Akira's childhood friend and the school's idol, serving as the star of its gymnastics team. She possesses notable physical flexibility, which allows her to attack from unexpected angles. Bighearted and quick-witted, she has long held feelings for Akira and habitually looks after him, though she refuses to admit her affection. Following the crash, she initially hides from the chaos before Akira finds her; she subsequently remains with his group. She frequently joins smaller reconnaissance teams and often becomes jealous when other women show interest in Akira.
Shirou Mariya (真理谷 四郎, Mariya Shirou)
A teenage prodigy, Shirou possesses an encyclopedic knowledge of prehistoric fauna and flora, which he accesses from his laptop. He was ranked first in his class for nine consecutive years and serves as the group's primary strategist and Sengoku's second-in-command. Highly logical, he often suppresses his emotions to maintain rationality, a stoicism that masks inner pain and previously resulted in few friendships. After a confrontation with Zaji, he resolves to discard this emotional mask and value his companions more openly.
Kouhei Arita (有田 幸平, Arita Kōhei)
Kouhei is Akira's best friend. Initially bullied, he gained popularity after Sengoku defended him, eventually becoming the star of the volleyball team. He tries to maintain morale among the survivors but snaps upon learning they cannot return home, killing the pilot in a rage. Plagued by guilt over this act and later a head injury, he descends into murderous paranoia, killing survivors and driving others to insanity. After a confrontation with Sengoku, he regrets his actions and aids the group's escape from a flooding cave, staying behind and is presumed dead. In truth, he survives and leaves to atone for his crimes, with only Yuki and Hades aware he is still alive.
Kanako Oomori (大森 夏奈子, Oomori Kanako)
An air stewardess who joins Akira's group. She is very knowledgeable in first aid, although she is also quite clumsy. She has low self-confidence, but only has pride in her large bust. While at first she was easily scared, even from the harmless Ptilodus (who are revealed to actually like her), eventually she becomes courageous, going as far as taking a stab from Kouhei. She grew to be rather close to Zaji and took her some time to overcome his death.
Kouichi Yarai (矢頼 光一, Yarai Kouichi)
Kurusu is a loner well-known for his violent tendencies and is the most formidable fighter in the series, possessing significant intelligence and advanced scientific knowledge. Primarily focused on unraveling the island's mysteries, he considers Sengoku his first genuine friend. His troubled past, marked by parental neglect and the deaths of his mother and aunt, shaped his solitary and aggressive nature. He harbors deep feelings for Kurusu, demonstrated when he nearly murders Akira under duress to save her. Following her recovery, he carries her constantly. He eventually overcomes his profound depression through his connection with Mami.
Kazuma Zaji (左治 一馬, Zaji Kazuma)
A tanned teenager. He comes from a broken family, where everyone ignores him. He does not do well in school, and has no friends his age. While perverted, Kazuma has a strong loyalty to his friends whom he considers like his own family. During the series, he begins to fall for Oomori, but is rejected when he finally confesses. Soon after, he gets injured during a fight with some of the island's animals. Realizing he is dying, he chooses to fall off a cliff in order to not make Oomori suffer emotionally, nor to become a burden to the rest of the group, making the entire group depressed over his death.

=== Sengoku's group ===
Yuki Sakuma (佐久間 雪, Sakuma Yuki)
Class President of Sengoku's class and a member of his group. She was originally a part of Kouhei Arita's group and is the only remaining survivor of the group, besides himself. She is very intelligent and is known for giving out various historic facts. She likes bears and has an interest in premonitions. She has a crush on Sengoku, but decides not to tell him since she knows he likes Rion.
Miina Isurugi (Fake) (石動 ミイナ, Isurugi Miina)
A mischievous, cross-dressing boy who disguises himself as Miina Isurugi, the granddaughter of billionaire Yoshimi Isurugi and heir to the Isurugi Conglomerate. Despite being a boy, everyone usually refers to him as "she" or "her". Akira and his group first meet "her" after being brought to "her" camp, where she rules a group of defenseless men with three Yakuza gangsters as her bodyguards and enforcers. In truth, Miina is using the Yakuza not to rule the camp but to protect "herself" as Miina had witnessed the men in "her" camp rape and accidentally killed a woman named Towa, an air stewardess and colleague of Kanako. Although small, Miina is depicted as a smart and strong character who uses "her" natural abilities as a lolita to manipulate others. His real name is Heijirou(平治郎, Heijirou).
Miina Isurugi (Real) (石動 ミイナ, Isurugi Miina)
A mysterious girl, the real granddaughter and heir of the billionaire Isurugi. She claims to have amnesia. She carries around a sketchbook with extremely accurate depictions of the island's wildlife and knows the details of their physiology. The fake Miina's appearance is very similar to hers, although her hair color is dark. Her name is carved on a tower in the center of the island. It is speculated that she develops feelings for Heijirou, her body double, since "she" saved her on multiple occasions.
Takashi Yamaguchi (山口 崇, Yamaguchi Takashi)
An intellectual individual who was also the student school council president for two years in a row. He was the leader of his own group before meeting Sengoku Akira and had effectively created a small base before meeting with Sengoku's Group. Yamaguchi has a lot of charisma considering he easily got a large group to follow his plan to create a school within their situation. He seems to have feelings for Yuki.
Maya Miyauchi (宮内 真夜, Miyauchi Maya)
Miyauchi is a skilled warrior who trained in a dojo from a young age and holds a second-dan black belt in karate. A confident and powerful fighter, she can smash targets with her kicks and possesses precise control over her movements. Her abilities make her a valuable combatant against both human and beastly threats. She is the childhood friend of the late Zaji Kazuma, whose death greatly upsets her. Despite her prowess, she finds opponents that can shrug off her attacks difficult and holds a particular terror of insects.
Rei Ooguro (大黒 レイ, Ooguro Rei)
A 20-year-old college student, Rei is a tomboy with an upbeat and caring personality. She often wears a bikini top, jacket, and mini shorts. She is highly perverted and prone to giving other girls mischievous, false advice. Having attended the same high school as most of the main cast, she is traveling with her friends Kotomi and Tooru. Her concern for the isolated Miina (Fake) stems from her close relationship with her own younger brother, who underwent a similar experience.
Tooru Rinzai (林西 トオル, Rinzai Tooru)
A 20-year-old college student and Rei's childhood friend, he is an open and friendly individual who prioritizes the group's well-being and addresses problems frankly. He remains consistently protective of Rei. His face was scarred by an Arctodus, leading him to conceal it with bandages until Kotomi's death.
Mami Kagura (神楽 真実, Kagura Mami)
A high school student with clairvoyant abilities, she can predict events in the near future. Shy and not from the main group's school, her original leaders used her powers deceptively, killing members of Akira's group to validate false predictions. After a genuine premonition was dismissed, her group was killed by pristichampsus; Akira saved her from the same fate. She now experiences occasional, uncertain premonitions about the surviving cast.
Kairi Narumi (成海 カイリ, Narumi Kairi)
The younger twin brother of Airi, whom he has a very deep connection. He has a lot of knowledge about dark stories. He accompanies Sengoku in his mission to the pyramid.
Airi Narumi (成海 アイリ, Narumi Airi)
The older twin sister of Kairi, whom she has a very deep connection, to the point of knowing the exact spot where her other twin is.
Ryouichi Suzuki (鈴木 綾一, Suzuki Ryouichi)
A perverted and lecherous student, he frequently attempts to manipulate others. He possesses incredible luck, which consistently results in his assignment to dangerous missions or roles as decoy or bait during animal attacks. The girls dislike him for his behavior, and Akira distrusts him completely following his attempted assault on Rion.
Shizuka Hatsuse (初瀬 静, Hatsuse Shizuka)
A former member of Yamaguchi's group, she was the vice president of the school student council and possesses an eidetic memory, granting her near-perfect recall. She accompanies Akira on the mission to the pyramid, where her observations are instrumental in helping the group eventually solve the island's mysteries.
Shuu Hikime (引目 修, Hikime Shuu)
A former kendo club member and Momoka Kirino's childhood friend, he possesses skill with a blade but struggles with a deep inferiority complex. He once abandons Akira to a Gigantopithecus, an act for which Sengoku punches him but ultimately forgives. He dies protecting Asuka Takahashi from a smilodon.
Momoka Kirino (桐野 桃香, Kirino Momoka)
A former member of the Kendo club and Shuu's childhood friend, who was also kidnapped by the Gigantopithecus and watched one of her friends die at the hands of the giant ape. She comes to resent Asuka for surviving instead of Shuu, but she eventually forgives her.
Asuka Takahashi (高橋 あすか, Takahashi Asuka)
A hardworking member of the group, her primary notable skill is singing. While accompanying Shuu to gather water, they are attacked by a smilodon; he sacrifices himself to save her. Following the tragedy, she helps lift the group's spirits with her song.

=== Morita's group ===
Makoto Morita (森田 真, Morita Makoto)
Known as Eiken, he one of Akira Sengoku's closest classmates and an aspiring photographer. A short boy whose bangs perpetually obscure his eyes, he survives on the island through the support of those around him.
Aya Tokiwa (常磐 あや, Tokiwa Aya)
An extremely athletic and stoic individual, she is the first to begin traveling with Makoto. A former track and field club member, she is a strong and effective fighter who hates to lose. She speaks very little and shows no remorse in combat. Her sole weak point is her lower back, and she once threatened to kill Ryouichi if he touched it again.
Seigou Komiyama (小見山 正剛, Komiyama Seigou)
A perverted lolicon who was forced by his parents to take on the ways of a monk because of a scandal when he worked at the City Council. Despite his pervertedness, he has useful skills and can also give good advice.
Hideo Igarashi (五十嵐 英夫, Igarashi Hideo)
The oldest person in Makoto's group, who's rather slothful and unhelpful to the group since he was a rather successful business man and had a lot of workers working under him.

=== Yarai's group ===
Motoko Kurusu (操栖 モトコ, Kurusu Motoko)
One of the teachers on the trip, she is aware of Yarai's past and acts as a maternal figure toward him, hinting at deeper feelings. Though somewhat clumsy and naive, she is deeply caring toward her students. During a chalicotherium attack, she sustains injuries leading to internal bleeding. Yarai seeks help from Nishikori, who agrees to operate only if Yarai kills Akira. After Nishikori's defeat and revelation that he is not a doctor, Yarai prepares to operate himself until the group persuades the actual physician, Junichi Mutou, to successfully perform the surgery.
Saki Segawa (瀬川 咲, Segawa Saki)
A strong-willed girl from a refined, wealthy family, she is the school's second most popular idol after Rion. She initially resents Yarai for seemingly rejecting her love letter, but later discovers it was a misunderstanding and falls in love with him, viewing Kurusu as her rival. In an attempt to be useful, she captures an anomalochelys to eat, but instead adopts it as a pet named Mr. Lucky.

=== Other survivors ===
Hades (ハデス)
A mysterious student who wears a mask he bought in Guam. His true goals and identity are a mystery and tends to appear out of nowhere. He manipulated Kouhei into starting killing for no reason, and later saved him from drowning on a whim. It is implied that he discovered that the students have been sent into the future and went mad, resulting in him giving into any whim that crosses his mind as there are no more consequences. His fate at the end of the series is unknown.
Daigo Yashiro (社 大吾, Yashiro Daigo)
A man with a yakuza-like appearance, he is actually an adventure novelist. He first appears aiding Junichi in escaping Nishikori's tyranny. Later, he guides students to the pyramid but refuses to re-enter it. His extensive research for his novels proves valuable to the survivors' efforts.
Junichi Mutou (武藤 順一, Mutou Jun'ichi)
A man accompanying Yashiro, who at first only seemed to be a physical therapist, until the group found out that he is a surgeon. Five years ago, his 10-year-old son suffered a car accident and he had to operate him, but because of exhaustion, he committed a mistake and his son died, making him unable to hold a scalpel. He recovers the will to be a doctor thanks to some rough motivation from Yashiro and the support of everyone in the group, successfully operating Motoko, saving the teacher's life.
Takashi Nishikori (錦織 隆, Nishikiori Takashi)
Nishikori, the manipulative leader of the pyramid group, falsely presents himself as a doctor due to his knowledge of pressure points, diseases, and pharmaceuticals. Lacking empathy and deeply misogynistic, he controls others through psychological manipulation and by exploiting their desires. He seized power when the group fell ill, claiming to possess the only cure and callously allowing the former leader and his daughter to die. He orders Yarai to kill Akira in exchange for saving Motoko's life. After his defeat, he reveals he merely worked for a pharmaceutical company and is not a doctor. He survives but loses a leg during a Paraceratherium attack.
Ugen Kokonoe (九重 右弦, Kokonoe Ugen)
A chemistry teacher on the trip, he displays a general dislike for troublemakers. Despite being perverted and having blown up his classroom multiple times, he remains employed for unexplained reasons.

=== Island's creatures ===
Diatryma
One of the first creatures encountered by Akira, taking Kanako to its nest, until Sengoku, Mariya and Oomori manage to escape from it. Another Diatryma appears later, only to be killed by a Smilodon. It is revealed at the end of the series that it is one of the first creatures that was successfully recreated.
Ptilodus
A small, harmless, squirrel-like animal that takes a liking towards Kanako, occasionally surrounding her.
Smilodon
The sabre-toothed cat, that first appears fighting and killing a Diatryma. A pair of them are later seen killing a Macrauchenia. A pride appears later alongside the Titanis and Propleopus to attack the survivors' base at the Tower and one of them kills Shuu Hikime when he tries to get water. Akira and Aya scare off the pride by breaking the fragile teeth of one of its members.
Andrewsarchus
The biggest carnivorous land mammal on the island, that attacks the plane attracted by the fire, devouring several passengers. He reappears at the beach, crushing a Meiolania's shell like nothing. It devours Masanori Tanaka, but finds itself in pain when accidentally eats some of Masanori's instant glue, making it leave the beach.
Megatherium
The biggest sloth in history. A group of them appears to feed from the trees near where the plane landed, shaking and damaging it while Mariya, Rion and Oomori were still inside. Akira scares them off by setting the plane's fuel on fire.
Ambulocetus
A primitive whale that lives like a seal or a crocodile. It first appears trying to drown Rion, but Akira scares it away when he rips some of its whiskers, making it swim away. It is later seen stalking Kanako and Zaji while they were saving Mariya from drowning.
Basilosaurus
A huge, serpent-like whale. Mina Mukouda and Masakazu Yoshimoto hijacked a raft for themselves and headed towards the 'other island', leaving Akira's group to die, only to find out that it was just a rock. The Basilosaurus then emerged from the water, destroyed the raft and devoured both.
Arsinoitherium
A rhinoceros-like creature related to elephants and dugongs. While at first Akira believed it was docile, it is revealed that this individual was sick, poisoned with the same berries that were killing the survivors. Akira and Rion found the cure in the middle of a herd of them, a flower that neutralizes the poison, but the animals showed their true, aggressive nature when they got too close. Akira and Rion are saved from being trampled by Yarai.
Megaladapis
A huge lemur. A group of them appears when Ono, Itou and Mikoshiba (members of Yarai's first group) were bullying a baby, and Yarai fought them off until they recovered the youngster. One of them was still attacking Akira, which caused Yarai to start laughing at him, surprising everyone, including the lemur.
Nemegtbaatar
A cretaceous, mouse-like animal that eats the same poisonous berries as the Arsinoitherium, and also neutralizes it with the same flowers. Rion and Akira followed it to a herd of Arsinoitherium, where they found the cure.
Entelodon
The Pigs from Hell. A herd of them appears in stampede and they cause Akira and Oomori to separate from the group. The herd returns attracted by the smell of blood, killing several of the men that had killed Towa, but they got into a fight with a pack of Hyaenodons.
Hyaenodon
The rivals of the entelodonts. A large pack appeared attracted by the blood and carnage caused by the entelodonts and the murder of Miina's bodyguards, killing the other survivors and even fighting the entelondons for food. One of them finds Shinzou Karino, the man who had led the gang rape and murder of Towa, and ate him.
Dire Wolf
A pack of them is led by a scarred individual that Akira nicknames Ernest. Akira and his exploration party end up in their territory and find themselves in the middle of a fight between the wolves and the short-faced bears, with the wolves refusing to back down since Ernest's mate was pregnant. Akira's group and the pack of wolves reach some sort of understanding about not harming each other and they work together to scare off the Arctodus. Ernest later saves Akira by leading the others where he had fallen from a cliff.
Arctodus
The short-faced bear. One of them scarred Tooru and Akira's exploration party found themselves in the middle of a territorial fight between a trio of bears and the pack of dire wolves. The wolves and the survivors scare them away by attacking their noses, the most sensitive part of their bodies.
Argentavis
The biggest flying bird in history. A flock appears to attack the survivor's base and one nearly kills Suzuki. While the survivors manage to scare them away temporarily, it turned out they carried poisonous ticks that killed some of the students. The flock returned to attack when the survivors were washing the ticks off at the river, but Mariya realized that their bones are weaker than they appear, and when Maya killed one of them, the flock fled at the sight of their dead comrade.
Chalicotherium
A relative of the horse with a gorilla-like body and long claws. Despite being herbivores, they're really aggressive. A trio of them attacks Yarai and Saki when they intrude in their feeding grounds, and one injures Kurusu. Yarai scares them away by breaking the claw of one of them.
Pristichampsus
A terrestrial crocodilian with long legs adapted for hunting on land, it is a poor swimmer. Kyouko Nakayama, Mami's manager, releases a large group into Akira's plateau camp in an attempt to kill the survivors. Instead, the creatures devour her and most of her own group, sparing only Mami. Akira's group escapes by fleeing to the river.
Gigantopithecus
The biggest ape in history. A family kidnaps Oomori and Kirino to be used as practice prey for their youngster. One of them easily killed an Eusmilus with its strength and intelligence. When Mariya decided to help Zaji escape from them, they realized that the apes had already encountered other survivors, and one of them fatally injures Zaji. Mariya, Zaji and Miyauchi scare them away by setting on fire a Nerium oleander, a plant whose poisonous smoke makes them flee.
Titanis
The terror bird. This birds became capable of imitating human voices like parrots, and all they say is "help me" after hearing it many times from its victims. A flock comes to attack the survivors at their base at The Tower alongside the Propleopus and the Smilodon, and one of them tries to eat Suzuki, only to spit him out. Tokiwa and Sengoku bring them down by taking advantage of their inability to make sharp turns and some are finished off by the Smilodons.
Propleopus
Carnivorous kangaroos. A group comes to attack the survivors alongside the Titanis and the Smilodon. While Akira and Tokiwa were away taking care of the Smilodon and the Titanis, the kangaroos return to attack the survivors. Akira manages to lure them to the trap hole in the Tower, making them fall to their deaths.
Rodhocetus
A primitive whale that represents an evolutionary stage between Ambulocetus and Basilosaurus. A group of these creatures attacks Yarai's party during their investigation of the lighthouse. One breaches the structure and attempts to attack Saki, but she is saved by Kouichi's timely intervention.
Chimera
A monstrous failed experiment, it hibernated beneath The Tower until unearthed trap holes awakened it. The creature resembles a gigantic, three-headed Smilodon with an armored back, human-like arms, and an extremely long tongue. Its six eyes provide a 360-degree field of vision but poor depth perception and color distinction. It swallows Miina (Fake) whole, but Mariya deduces its organs remain impaired from prolonged hibernation. The group saves her by repeatedly stabbing its stomach until it collapses, after which Akira and Kouichi deliver the final blows.
Chimera II
A second failed experiment, it awakens simultaneously with the first. Resembling a demon with ram-like horns, an anteater-like tail, and goat legs, it is capable of leaping great distances. Kouhei drags it back into a trap hole to allow Akira's group to defeat the first creature. He blinds it, breaks one of its horns, and ultimately kills it.
Paraceratherium
The biggest land mammal that has ever lived, a gigantic giraffe-like rhinoceros.

== Publication ==
Written and illustrated by Yoshinobu Yamada, the manga Cage of Eden was serialized in Kodansha's shōnen manga magazine Weekly Shōnen Magazine from November 26, 2008, to January 23, 2013. Kodansha collected its chapters in twenty-three tankōbon volumes, released from February 17, 2009, to February 15, 2013.

On December 12, 2010, Kodansha USA announced that they had licensed the manga for English language release in North America.

=== Volumes ===
| No. | Original release date | Original ISBN | English release date | English ISBN |
|---|---|---|---|---|
| 1 | February 17, 2009 | 978-4-06-384106-0 | August 23, 2011 | 978-1-935429-25-8 |
1. "What a Wonderful World" (What a wonderful world:素晴らしきこの世界, Subarashiiki Kono Sekai); 2. "The Law of the Jungle" (The law of the jungle:ジャングルの掟, Janguru no Okite); 3. "Frenzy" (Fever:熱狂, Nekkyō); 4. "Freedom of the Beasts" (Freedom of the brute:獣たちの自由, Kemono-tachi no Jiyū)
Akira Sengoku and his friends were returning home from Guam school trip. During the midflight the whole Plane shakes and it starts to fall down. Akira tried to find Rion Akagami. Before he reaches her, he loses unconscious. The next morning he wakes up middle in the jungle and the plane is nowhere in sight.
| 2 | April 17, 2009 | 978-4-06-384131-2 | October 25, 2011 | 978-1-9354-2926-5 |
5. "Lord of the Underworld" (Lord of the other side:冥府の王, Meifu no Ō); 6. "The Underdog" (The underdog:負け犬, Makeinu); 7. "A Duty Towards Life" (Duty for all lives:生命への使命, Inochi e no Shimei); 8. "Light & Darkness" (Light & Darkness:光と闇, Hikari to Yami); 9. "The King of Hell" (Hell's bosshead:地獄の統治者, Jigoku no Tōchisha); 10. "Camaraderie" (Brotherhood:仲間, Nakama); 11. "Dead End" (Dead end:行き止まり, Ikidomari); 12. "Despair" (Cry out:切望, Zetsubō); 13. "Suggestive Lips" (Eloquent lip:思わせぶりな唇, Omowaseburi na Kichibiru)
| 3 | July 17, 2009 | 978-4-06-384166-4 | December 20, 2011 | 978-1-935429-27-2 |
14. "Sense of Foreboding" (Presentiment:悪い予感, Warui Kokan); 15. "Monkey Kin?" (Monkey mate?:仲間?, Nakama?); 16. "Outbreak" (Epidemic:悪病, Akubyō); 17. "Prayer" (Amazing Grace:祈り, Inori); 18. "Escaping Fate" (Run away from fate:脱出, Dasshutsu); 19. "The Victor" (Winner:勝者, Shōsha); 20. "Stairway to Heaven" (Stairway to Heaven:天国への階段, Tengoku e no Kaidan); 21. "Child of God" (Child of God:神の子, Kami no Ko); 22. "Ice Princess" (Iron Maiden:冷酷な乙女, Reikoku na Otome)
| 4 | September 17, 2009 | 978-4-06-384190-9 | February 28, 2012 | 978-1-61262-048-0 |
23. "The Secret Map" (Plan of secret:内緒の地図, Naisho no Chizu); 24. "Uprising" (Riot:蜂起, Hōki); 25. "Good Peeps" (Good fellows:仲間, Nakama); 26. "Liar, Liar" (Fibber:嘘つき, Usotsuki); 27. "The Arrival of Yuki (Brain Damage 1)" (Loss brain①:雪の訪れ, Yuki no Otozure); 28. "Underground World (Brain Damage 2)" (Loss brain②:アンダーワールド, Andā Wārudo); 29. "He Who Forges Ahead (Brain Damage 3)" (Loss brain③:先を行く男, Saki o Yuku Otoko); 30. "Rion & Yuki, Akira & the God of Death (Brain Damage 4)" (Loss brain④:りおんと雪、アキラと死神, Rion to Yuki, Akira to Shinigami); 31. "The Vanishing Eyes (Brain Damage 5)" (Loss brain⑤:消えてしまった目, Kieteshimatta Me)
| 5 | December 17, 2009 | 978-4-06-384226-5 | April 10, 2012 | 978-1-61262-049-7 |
32. "The Lost Brain" (Loss brain⑥:欠損した脳, Kessonshita Nō); 33. "It's All or Nothing! Stop Him!" (Loss brain⑦:体を張れ! ヤツを止めろ!!, Karada o Hare! Yatsu o Tomero!!); 34. "Dried-Up Heart" (Loss brain⑧:渇いた心, Kawaita Kokoro); 35. "Assembly" (Loss brain⑨:集結, Shūketsu); 36. "Sky of Light" (Loss brain⑩:光の空, Hikari no Sora); 37. "A Country of Children" (A juvenile state:子供の国, Kodomo no Kuni); 38. "The Dream the Flag Showed Us" (A flag of our future:旗が見せる夢, Hata ga Miseru Yume); 39. "Under a Magic Spell" (Enchanted:魔法にかけられて, Mahō ni Kakerarete); 40. "Union" (Union:団結, Danketsu)
| 6 | February 17, 2010 | 978-4-06-384253-1 | August 7, 2012 | 978-1-61-262050-3 |
41. "Two Blank Days" (Blank 2 days:空白の2日間, Kūhaku no Futsu-kakan); 42. "The Beginning of the End" (The start in end:終わりの始まり, Owari no Hajimari); 43. "Hairline Crack" (Hairline crack:小さなひび, Chiisana Hibi); 44. "Death" (Death:死, Shi); 45. "Clear the Way" (Clear the way:活路, Katsuro); 46. "Bridge Over Troubled Water" (Bridge Over Troubled Water:明日に架ける橋, Asa ni Kakeru Hashi); 47. "A Life or a Death" (A life or a death:生か死か, Sei ka Shi ka); 48. "Judgment from the Air" (Judgement from the air:審判, Shinpan); 49. "Omen" (Omen:前兆, Zenchō)
| 7 | June 17, 2010 | 978-4-06-384302-6 | October 2, 2012 | 978-1-61-262051-0 |
50. "A Long Shot" (A long shot:大いなる賭け, Ōinaru Kake); 51. "The Heart of a Hero" (Brave Heart:勇者の心, Yūsha no Kokoro); 52. "Knockdown!" (Knockdown!:倒れる!, Taoreru!); 53. "Flames of Departure" (Fire of departure:旅立ちの火, Tabidachi no Hi); 54. "Joie de Vivre" (Come to life:活気, Katsuki); 55. "A Misty Mountain" (A misty mountain:霧立つ山, Kiri Tatsu Yama); 56. "Return from Death" (Rise from the dead:黄泉返り, Yomigaeri); 57. "Resurrection of Friendship" (Resurrection of friendship:帰ってきた友情, Kaettekita Yūjō); 58. "Spectre Peak" (Mountain of the dead:死霊峰, Shiryōbō)
| 8 | July 16, 2010 | 978-4-06-384333-0 | December 18, 2012 | 978-1-61-262052-7 |
59. "Stigma" (Holy mark:傷痕, Kizuato); 60. "Abandon the Past" (Abandon the past:置いてきた過去, Oitekita Kako); 61. "A Glorious View" (A view in all its glory:素晴らしきこの眺め, Subarashiiki Kono Nagame); 62. "What a Guy!" (Fantastic guy:とんでもない男(ヤツ), Tondemonai Yatsu); 63. "Fight or Flight?" (Fight or Flight:ヤルか? 逃げるか?, Yaru ka? Nigeru ka?); 64. "Duel of the Beasts" (Duel of the brute:野獣対決, Yajū Taiketsu); 65. "Laplace's Demon" (Laplace's demon:ラプラスの悪魔, Rapurasu no Akuma); 66. "Beginning W" (Beginning W:始まりのW, Hajimari no W); 67. "Re-Awakening" (Re-awakening:目覚め, Mezame)
| 9 | September 17, 2010 | 978-4-06-384365-1 | February 19, 2013 | 978-1-61-262053-4 |
68. "Premonition" (Prognosis:予知, Yochi); 69. "Fantasy or Reality?" (Fantasy or Reality:夢か現実か, Yume ka Genjitsu ka); 70. "And Then There Were None" (And then there were none:そして誰もいなくなった, Soshite Dare mo Inakunatta); 71. "Premonition's Conclusion" (Upshot of the prevision:予知の結末, Yochi no Ketsumatsu); 72. "Forbidden Love" (Love his sweet-heart:横恋慕, Yokorenbo); 73. "A Confession?" (Confession?:告白?, Kokuhaku?); 74. "A Visitor from the Dark" (Visitor at the dark:闇からの来訪者, Yami kara no Raihōsha); 75. "Mr. Know-It-All" (Mr.Brain:知的なヤツ, Chiteki na Yatsu); 76. "Rift Between Friends" (Beating friends:仲間割れ, Nakamaware)
| 10 | December 17, 2010 | 978-4-06-384420-7 | May 21, 2013 | 978-1-61-262259-0 |
77. "Solitude" (Solitude:孤独, Kodoku); 78. "Family" (The tribe:家族, Kazoku); 79. "The End?" (The end?:終わり?, Owari?); 80. "The Opening" (Open the way:突破口, Toppakō); 81. "Sink or Swim!" (Sink or swim!:イチかバチか!, Ichi ka Bachi ka!); 82. "Long Goodbye" (Long good-by:長いお別れ, Nagai Owakare); 83. "Smile for Me" (Smile sweetly:笑ってよ‥, Waratte yo..); 84. "Relic" (Relic:遺物, Ibutsu); 85. "Disappearance" (Disappearance:消失, Shōshitsu)
| 11 | February 17, 2011 | 978-4-06-384447-4 | August 20, 2013 | 978-1-61-262260-6 |
86. "A Special Place" (Especial place:特別な場所, Tokubetsu na Basho); 87. "My Girl" (My girl:マイ・ガール, Mai Gāru); 88. "Charge!" (Forward, my men!:前へ進め!, Mae e Susume!); 89. "Mouth of the Earth" (Mouth of the earth:大地の口, Daichi no Kuchi); 90. "Pitfall" (Pitfall:落とし穴, Otoshi Ana); 91. "A Place to Survive" (Place for survive:生きるための場所, Ikiru Tame no Basho); 92. "A Man-Made Mountain" (A man-made mountain:人の造り給いし山, Hito no Tsukuri Tamaishi Yama); 93. "Guess Who's Coming to Dinner" (Guess Who's coming to Dinner:招かれざる客, Manekarezaru Kyaku); 94. "The Wish He Left Behind" (Strong will:友が残した思い, Tomo ga Nokoshita Omoi)
| 12 | May 17, 2011 | 978-4-06-384490-0 | November 12, 2013 | 978-1-61262-261-3 |
95. "Captive Birds" (Captive birds:逃げ場無し, Nigebanashi); 96. "Tomorrow" (Tomorrow:希望, Kibō); 97. "Truth or Nonsense" (Truth or nonsense:真実かデタラメか, Shinjitsu ka Detarame ka); 98. "Her Words Were True" (Her words were true:的中, Tekichū); 99. "Extermination" (Extermination:勝利, Shōri); 100. "Excavation" (Excavation:発見, Hakken); 101. "A Soliloquy" (A soliloquy:意味深な呟き, Imishin na Tsubuyaki); 102. "Salvation" (Salvation:施無畏, Semui); 103. "A Tower at the Shore" (A tower at the shore:もう一つの塔, Mō Hitotsu no Tō)
| 13 | July 15, 2011 | 978-4-06-384521-1 | February 18, 2014 | 978-1-61262-262-0 |
104. "A Mysterious Lady" (A mysterious lady:鍵, Kagi); 105. "The Map" (A map:地図, Chizu); 106. "A Maiden's Heart" (Jelly beans:乙女心, Otome Kokoro); 107. "Visitors" (Stranger:訪問者, Hōmonsha); 108. "The Deal" (Exchange:取引, Torihiki); 109. "Pyramid" (Pyramid:第三の塔, Dai-san no Tō); 110. "Whom Should I Choose?" (Whom should I choose?:選択, Sentaku); 111. "A Brief Separation" (A brief separation:出発, Shuppatsu); 112. "Coward" (Coward:いくじなし, Ikujinashi)
| 14 | October 17, 2011 | 978-4-06-384568-6 | May 27, 2014 | 978-1-61262-263-7 |
113. "The Tower of Terror" (The tower of terror:恐怖の塔, Kyōfu no Tō); 114. "Darkness and Death" (Darkness and death:闇と死, Yami to Shi); 115. "The Way to Go" (The way to go:進むべき道, Susumubeki Michi); 116. "Underground" (Underground:地下空間, Chika Kūkan); 117. "Profound Darkness" (A sense of sin:深い闇, Fukai Yami); 118. "B3" (B3:新たなる発見, Arata naru Hakken); 119. "Too Large" (Too large:オーバースペック, Ōbā Supekku); 120. "Deeper and Deeper" (Deeply deeply:深く 深く, Fukaku Fukaku); 121. "Strange Plants" (Strange plants:奇妙な植物, Kimyō na Shokubutsu)
| 15 | December 16, 2011 | 978-4-06-384602-7 | August 26, 2014 | 978-1-61262-264-4 |
122. "A Secret Garden" (A secret garden:秘密の園, Himitsu no Sono); 123. "Heroine" (Heroine:それも、これも, Soremo, Soremo); 124. "The Dark Room" (The dark room:漆黒の部屋, Shikkoku no Heya); 125. "Sygdommen til Døden" (Sygdommen til Døden:死に至る病, Shi ni Itaru Yamai); 126. "The Room 1" (The room 1:目指していた場所, Mezashiteita Basho); 127. "The Room 2" (The room 2:培養されしもの, Baiyōsareshi Mono); 128. "The Room 3" (The room 3:禁忌(タブー), Tabū); 129. "Unnatural Life" (Unnatural life:不自然な命, Fushizen na Inochi); 130. "Insanity" (Insanity:暴挙, Bōkyo)
| 16 | March 16, 2012 | 978-4-06-384645-4 | November 11, 2014 | 978-1-61262-560-7 |
131. "Time Limit" (Time limit:タイムリミット, Taimu Rimitto); 132. "Diagnosis" (Diagnosis:診断, Shindan); 133. "Ephemeral Life" (Death to approach:露命, Romei); 134. "Mami's Vision" (Unbelievable prediction:真実の視たもの, Mami no Mita Mono); 135. "We're Back" (Way back:ただいま, Tadaima); 136. "The Secret of 'Miina's Tower'" (Secret of the tower:「ミイナの塔」の秘密, "Miina no Tō" no Himitsu); 137. "The Big Gamble" (High play:大博打, Ōbakuchi); 138. "Yarai's Decision" (Decision:矢頼の決断, Yarai no Ketsudan); 139. "Strong Bond" (Strong bond:絆, Kizuna)
| 17 | May 17, 2012 | 978-4-06-384674-4 | February 17, 2015 | 978-1-61262-796-0 |
140. "The Fourth Tower" (The fourth tower:第四の塔, Dai-yon no Tō); 141. "The Sorrowful Fist" (Kill the friend:哀しき拳, Kanashiki Kobushi); 142. "Yarai's Past" (The past of a mad dog:矢頼の過去, Yarai no Kako); 143. "Kindness" (Weakness:優しさ, Yasashisa); 144. "The Awakening Monster" (Awakening monster:目覚めし怪物, Mezameshi Kaibutsu); 145. "The Chimera" (Horrifying failure:キメラ, Kimera); 146. "Arrival" (Arrival of the strongest man:到着, Tōchaku); 147. "Turned Tables" (Snake and frog:形勢逆転, Keisei Gyakuten); 148. "Miina, Dead?!" (Swallowing whole:ミイナ死す!?, Miina Shisu!?)
| 18 | August 17, 2012 | 978-4-06-384721-5 | August 18, 2015 | 978-1-61262-983-4 |
149. "Dangerous Strategy" (Dangerous strategy:危険な作戦, Kiken na Sakusen); 150. "Two Monsters" (Two monsters:二匹の怪物, Nihiki no Kaibutsu); 151. "The Man Underground" (Kohei Arita:地下の男, Chika no Otoko); 152. "Concerted Attack" (Cross fire:一斉攻撃, Issei Kōgeki); 153. "Light and Shadow" (Light and shadow:光と影, Hikari to Kage); 154. "Good Teacher" (Good teacher:救うべき命, Sukūbeki Inochi); 155. "The Most Fearsome Animal" (The most terrible animal:最も恐ろしい動物, Motto mo Osoroshii Dōbutsu); 156. "Surprise Attack" (Sudden assault:急襲, Kyūshū); 157. "New Strategy" (New strategy:新たな作戦, Arata na Sakusen)
| 19 | October 17, 2012 | 978-4-06-384751-2 | November 17, 2015 | 978-1-61262-984-1 |
158. "Battle of the Dark Night" (Battle of the dark night:闇夜の攻防, Yamiyo no Kōhō); 159. "Miina's Message" (Hidden message:ミイナのメッセージ, Miina no Messēji); 160. "The Devil's Poll" (Wicked vote:悪魔の投票, Akuma no Tōhyō); 161. "Execution" (The result of vote:処刑, Shokei); 162. "The Devil's Secret" (Secret of the devil:悪魔の秘密, Akuma no Himitsu); 163. "Who Is the Doctor?" (Who is the doctor?:医者は誰だ, Isha wa Dare da); 164. "Surgery of Darkness" (Dangerous operation:闇の手術, Yami no Shujutsu); 165. "Appealing to the Soul" (Desperate persuasion:魂の説得, Tamashii no Settoku); 166. "What the Stars Show" (The thing stars show:星が示すもの, Hoshi ga Shimesu Mono)
| 20 | December 17, 2012 | 978-4-06-384784-0 | May 17, 2016 | 978-1-63236-032-8 |
167. "The Two Drawings" (Two pictures:二つの絵, Futatsu no E); 168. "The Last Tower" (The last tower:最後の塔, Saigo no Tō); 169. "Inescapable Bonds" (The bonds of friendship:クサレ縁, Kusare En); 170. "Invisible Observer" (Invisible observer:見えない観察者, Mienai Kansatsusha); 171. "Mournful Lie" (Last request:哀しき嘘, Kanashiki Uso); 172. "God's Domain" (God's territory:神の領域, Kami no Ryōiki); 173. "Raika Island" (The name of island:ライカ島, Raika-tō); 174. "Photos" (Timeworn Photographs:写真, Shashin); 175. "The Observer's Identity" (Figure of the observer:観察者の正体, Kansatsusha no Shōtai)
| 21 | February 15, 2013 | 978-4-06-384823-6 | May 16, 2017 | 978-1-63236-125-7 |
176. "A Girl and The Encyclopedia" (A girl and illustrated book:少女と図鑑, Shōjo to Zukan); 177. "The God of Death" (The contents of the bottle:死神, Shinigami); 178. "Great Confusion" (Great confusion:大混乱, Dai Konran); 179. "Inference" (Inference:推理, Suiri); 180. "The Secret Weapon" (Repellent:秘密兵器, Himitsu Heiki); 181. "2307"; 182. "That Which Should Not Be There" (Memento:あるはずのないもの, Aru Hazu no Nai Mono); 183. "A Mother's Sorrow" (Sorrow of mother:母の悲しみ, Haha no Kanashimi); 184. "Project Eden" (The project of eden:エデン計画, Eden Keikaku); 185. "Hope" (The hope:希望, Kibō)

== Reception ==
Katherine Dacey of The Manga Critic reviewed the first manga volume saying while she disliked the characters for "doing and saying things that defy common sense", she praised the author for "populating the island with scary-looking monsters and staging thrilling action sequences that temporarily erase the memory of the clumsy dialogue and panty shots". Brigid Alverson of MTV Geek reviewed the first manga volume concluding, "The story has been told before, and Cage of Eden is no literary or philosophical masterpiece, but taken on its own terms as an action-suspense story, it delivers the goods and leaves the reader wanting more."

Rebecca Silverman of Anime News Network enjoyed the first manga volume and gave it a B, saying, "Despite its slow start, Cage of Eden becomes deeply engrossing, so that once a certain point is reached, it is nearly impossible to put down."

== See also ==
- Deathtopia, another manga series by the same author
- Satanophany, another manga series by the same author
