= Xianyuechelys =

Xianyuechelys Temporal range: Maastrichtian

Scientific classification
- Kingdom: Animalia
- Phylum: Chordata
- Class: Reptilia
- Order: Testudines
- Suborder: Cryptodira
- Family: †Nanhsiungchelyidae
- Genus: †Xianyuechelys; Ke et al., 2024
- Species: †X. yingliangi

Binomial name
- †Xianyuechelys yingliangi Ke et al., 2024

Extinct genus of reptiles

Xianyuechelys is an extinct genus of nanhsiungchelyid turtle that inhabited China during the Maastrichtian stage of the Cretaceous period.
