= Satanophany =

Japanese manga series

- First tankōbon volume cover

サタノファニ (Satanofani)
- Genre: Erotic suspense
- Manga
- Written by: Yoshinobu Yamada
- Published by: Kodansha
- Imprint: Young Magazine KC
- Magazine: Weekly Young Magazine (2017–2023); Yanmaga Web (2023–present)
- Original run: March 13, 2017 – present
- Volumes: 38
- icon

Satanophany (Japanese: サタノファニ, Hepburn: Satanofani) is a Japanese manga series written and illustrated by Yoshinobu Yamada. It was serialized in Kodansha's seinen manga magazine Weekly Young Magazine from March 2017 to July 2023, and later moved to the Yanmaga Web website and app in September 2023.

== Plot ==
A phenomenon called Medusa Syndrome sweeps across Japan, causing seemingly ordinary young women to develop murderous split personalities, while having no memory of what their murderous personality does. Chika Amagi is nearly raped when her Medusa Syndrome kicks in and she kills the attackers. She is disowned by her parents as she is arrested and sentenced to Haguro Island Prison along with other sufferers of Medusa Syndrome. Once there, she and other inmates are medically experimented on by a mysterious corporation to implant the mindsets of famous serial killers and mass-murderers via activation of so-called "mirror-neurons". The goal of the corrupt prison staff and corporate benefactors is to activate and weaponize these murderous personalities so they can become a team of elite assassins, each with a skillset tied to their implanted killer. After an initial training competition against one-another, they are sent on top-secret missions.

== Publication ==
Written and illustrated by Yoshinobu Yamada, Satanophany started in Kodansha's seinen manga magazine Weekly Young Magazine on March 13, 2017. In July 2021, it was announced that the manga had entered its final stage. The series finished in Weekly Young Magazine on July 28, 2023, and moved to the Yanmaga Web manga website and app on September 6 of the same year. Kodansha has collected its chapters into individual tankōbon volumes. The first volume was released on June 6, 2017. As of October 6, 2026, 38 volumes have been released.

=== Volumes ===
| No. | Japanese release date | Japanese ISBN |
|---|---|---|
| 1 | June 6, 2017 | 978-4-06-382979-2 |
| 2 | August 4, 2017 | 978-4-06-510073-8 |
| 3 | November 6, 2017 | 978-4-06-510345-6 |
| 4 | March 6, 2018 | 978-4-06-511101-7 |
| 5 | May 7, 2018 | 978-4-06-511449-0 |
| 6 | August 6, 2018 | 978-4-06-512412-3 |
| 7 | October 5, 2018 | 978-4-06-513116-9 |
| 8 | January 4, 2019 | 978-4-06-514215-8 |
| 9 | April 5, 2019 | 978-4-06-515193-8 |
| 10 | July 5, 2019 | 978-4-06-516368-9 |
| 11 | October 4, 2019 | 978-4-06-517345-9 |
| 12 | February 6, 2020 | 978-4-06-518491-2 |
| 13 | May 7, 2020 | 978-4-06-519598-7 |
| 14 | August 5, 2020 | 978-4-06-520459-7 |
| 15 | November 6, 2020 | 978-4-06-521331-5 |
| 16 | February 5, 2021 | 978-4-06-522280-5 |
| 17 | June 4, 2021 | 978-4-06-523346-7 |
| 18 | August 5, 2021 | 978-4-06-524345-9 |
| 19 | November 5, 2021 | 978-4-06-525855-2 |
| 20 | February 4, 2022 | 978-4-06-526832-2 |
| 21 | May 6, 2022 | 978-4-06-527801-7 |
| 22 | August 5, 2022 | 978-4-06-528794-1 |
| 23 | November 4, 2022 | 978-4-06-529798-8 |
| 24 | March 6, 2023 | 978-4-06-531062-5 |
| 25 | June 6, 2023 | 978-4-06-531977-2 |
| 26 | September 6, 2023 | 978-4-06-533011-1 |
| 27 | December 6, 2023 | 978-4-06-533929-9 |
| 28 | February 6, 2024 | 978-4-06-534609-9 |
| 29 | April 5, 2024 | 978-4-06-535366-0 |
| 30 | June 6, 2024 | 978-4-06-535824-5 |
| 31 | August 6, 2024 | 978-4-06-536539-7 |
| 32 | November 6, 2024 | 978-4-06-537448-1 |
| 33 | February 6, 2025 | 978-4-06-538458-9 |
| 34 | June 6, 2025 | 978-4-06-539943-9 |
| 35 | October 6, 2025 | 978-4-06-541154-4 |
| 36 | February 6, 2026 | 978-4-06-542520-6 |
| 37 | June 5, 2026 | 978-4-06-543822-0 |
| 38 | October 6, 2026 | 978-4-06-545177-9 |

== See also ==
- Cage of Eden, another manga series by the same author
- Deathtopia, another manga series by the same author
