= Deathtopia =

Japanese manga series

- Cover of the first volume
- Genre: Supernatural thriller
- Manga
- Written by: Yoshinobu Yamada
- Published by: Kodansha
- English publisher: NA: Kodansha USA (digital)
- Imprint: Evening KC
- Magazine: Evening
- Original run: April 22, 2014 – December 13, 2016
- Volumes: 8
- icon

Deathtopia (stylized in all caps) is a Japanese manga series written and illustrated by Yoshinobu Yamada. It was serialized in Kodansha's seinen manga magazine Evening from April 2014 to December 2016, with its chapters collected in eight tankōbon volumes.

== Publication ==
Written and illustrated by Yoshinobu Yamada, Deathtopia was serialized in Kodansha's seinen manga magazine Evening from April 22, 2014, to December 13, 2016. Kodansha collected its chapters in eight tankōbon volumes, released from July 23, 2014, to December 22, 2016.

In North America, Kodansha USA announced the English digital release of the manga in January 2017.

=== Volumes ===
No.	Original release date	Original ISBN	English release date	English ISBN
1	July 23, 2014	978-4-06-354523-4	January 24, 2017	—
2	November 21, 2014	978-4-06-354548-7	January 31, 2017	—
3	February 23, 2015	978-4-06-354557-9	August 29, 2017	—
4	June 23, 2015	978-4-06-354572-2	September 26, 2017	—
5	October 23, 2015	978-4-06-354592-0; 978-4-06-362313-0 (LE)	October 31, 2017	—
6	March 23, 2016	978-4-06-354609-5	November 28, 2017	—
7	July 22, 2016	978-4-06-354624-8	November 28, 2017	—
8	December 22, 2016	978-4-06-354650-7; 978-4-06-362349-9 (LE)	January 16, 2018	—

== See also ==
- Cage of Eden, another manga series by the same author
- Satanophany, another manga series by the same author
