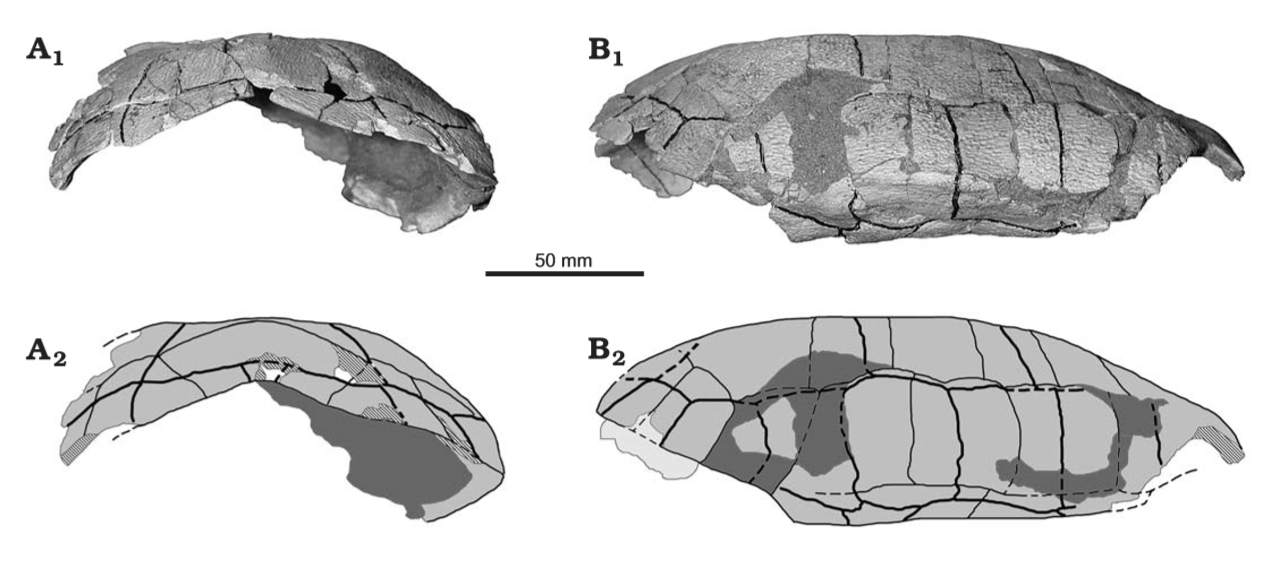
- Kharakhutulia kalandadzei, holotype

Scientific classification
- Kingdom: Animalia
- Phylum: Chordata
- Class: Reptilia
- Order: Testudines
- Suborder: Cryptodira
- Family: †Nanhsiungchelyidae
- Genus: †Kharakhutulia; Sukhanov, Danilov & Syromyatnikova, 2008

Type species
- †Kharakhutulia kalandadzei Sukhanov, Danilov & Syromyatnikova, 2008

= Kharakhutulia =

Kharakhutulia Temporal range: Cenomanian–Turonian, 99.7–84.9 Ma

Extinct genus of turtles

Kharakhutulia is a genus of nanhsiungchelyid turtle from the Upper Cretaceous. Its genus name refers to the location where it was found, namely the Khara Khutul fossil locality of Mongolia. Its species name refers to the scientist who collected the holotype specimen: Dr. Nikolai N. Kalandadze. Kharakhutulia has been found in rocks dating to the Cenomanian and Turonian subdivisions of the Late Cretaceous, and has thus far been exclusively found in Mongolia.
