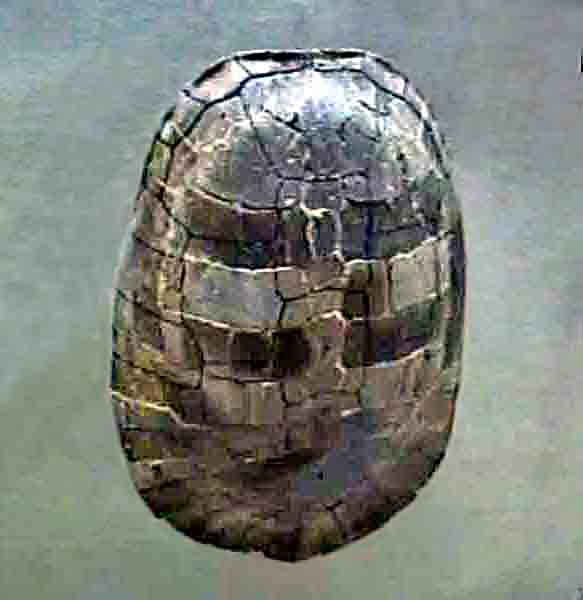
- Shell of Adocus beatus, Peabody Museum of Natural History

Scientific classification
- Kingdom: Animalia
- Phylum: Chordata
- Class: Reptilia
- Order: Testudines
- Suborder: Cryptodira
- Clade: †Adocusia
- Family: †Adocidae; Cope, 1869

Type species
- †Emys beatus Leidy, 1865

Subfamilies
- †Proadocus; †Adocinae Cope, 1869: †Adocus; †Shachemydinae Khosatzky, 1977: †Adocoides; †Ferganemys; †Isanemys; †Mlynarskiella; †Protoshachemys; †Shachemys; †Shineusemys

= Adocidae =

Adocidae Temporal range: Cretaceous–Paleogene

Extinct family of turtles

The Adocidae are an extinct family of aquatic and omnivorous turtles. They are freshwater cryptodiran turtles and are mainly known from Cretaceous and Paleogene Asia and North America.

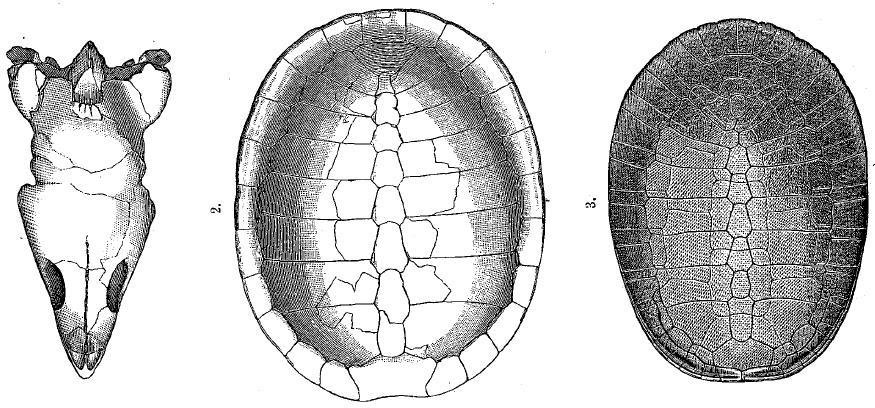
Skull and shell of Glyptops ornatus, and shell of Adocus beatus

== Taxonomy ==
Phylogeny modified from Danilov et al. (2013). Yehguia is most likely synonymous with Sinaspideretes, and is placed outside of Adocidae here for reasons proposed in Tong, Li & Ouyang (2013).

- Trionychoidea
  - Nanhsiungchelyidae
  - - Yehguia(=Sinaspideretes?)
    - Adocidae
      - - Ferganemys itemirensis
        - Ferganemys verzilini
        - Shachemys
          - Shachemys laosiana
          - - Shachemys ancestralis
            - Shachemys baibolatica
      - Adocus
        - Adocus beatus
        - Adocus bossi
        - Adocus kirtlandius
        - - Adocus inexpectatus
          - Adocus amtgai
          - Adocus aksary

== Distribution ==
Species of this genus are present in Oligocene of Kazakhstan, Paleocene of United States, and the Cretaceous of Canada, Japan, South Korea, Kazakhstan, Kyrgyzstan, Laos, Mexico, Mongolia, Tajikistan, Thailand, United States and Uzbekistan.
