= Anomalochelys =

Anomalochelys Temporal range: Upper Cretaceous

Scientific classification
- Domain: Eukaryota
- Kingdom: Animalia
- Phylum: Chordata
- Class: Reptilia
- Order: Testudines
- Suborder: Cryptodira
- Family: †Nanhsiungchelyidae
- Genus: †Anomalochelys; Hirayama et al., 2001
- Species: †A. angulata

Binomial name
- †Anomalochelys angulata Hirayama et al., 2001

Extinct genus of turtles

Anomalochelys (/əˌnɒməloʊˈkiːlɪs/) is an extinct genus of land turtle from the Upper Cretaceous of Hokkaido, Japan, Guangdong, China.
