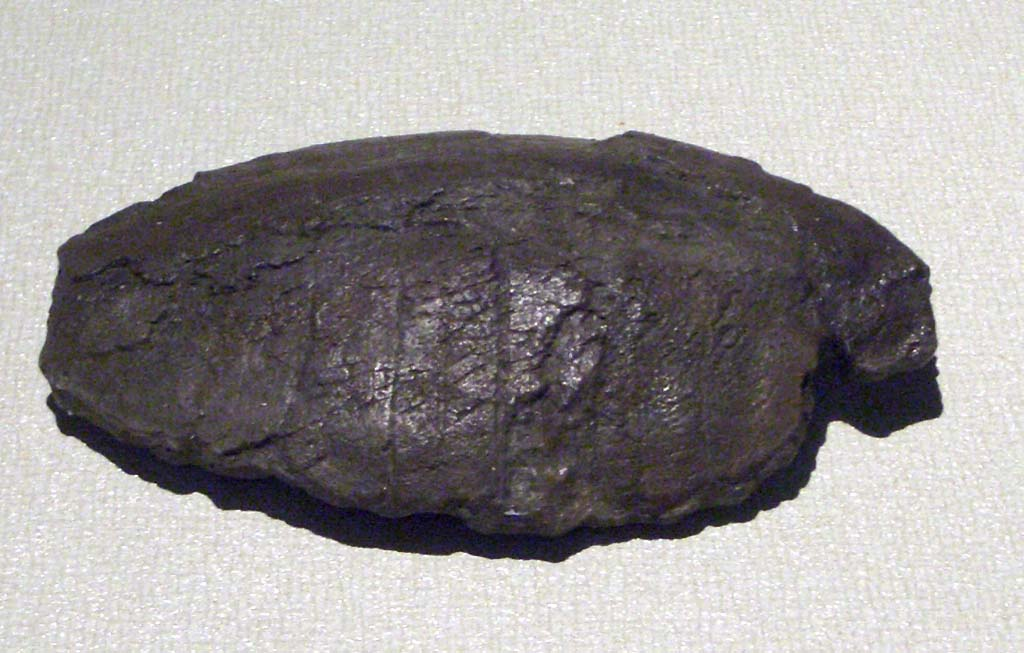
- Sinaspideretes wimani fossil displayed in Hong Kong Science Museum.

Scientific classification
- Domain: Eukaryota
- Kingdom: Animalia
- Phylum: Chordata
- Class: Reptilia
- Order: Testudines
- Suborder: Cryptodira
- Clade: Polycryptodira
- Superfamily: Trionychia
- Genus: Sinaspideretes; Young and Chow, 1953
- Species: S. wimani

Binomial name
- Sinaspideretes wimani Young & Chow, 1953

= Sinaspideretes =

Sinaspideretes Temporal range: Late Jurassic161.2–155.7 Ma

Extinct genus of turtles

Sinaspideretes is an extinct genus of turtle from the Late Jurassic of China, probably from the Shaximiao Formation. It is considered the earliest and most basal representative of the Trionychia, and is possibly the oldest known member of Cryptodira. In 2013, it was proposed that this animal and the genus Yehguia are in fact one and the same.

== Sources ==
- The Age of Dinosaurs in Russia and Mongolia by Michael J. Benton, Mikhail A. Shishkin, David M. Unwin, and Evgenii N. Kurochkin
- Chinese Fossil Vertebrates by Spencer G. Lucas
