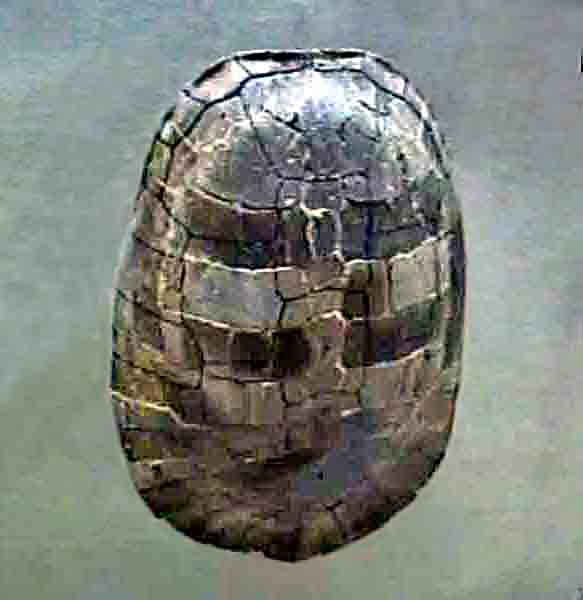
- Shell of Adocus beatus, Peabody Museum of Natural History

Scientific classification
- Kingdom: Animalia
- Phylum: Chordata
- Class: Reptilia
- Order: Testudines
- Suborder: Cryptodira
- Family: †Adocidae
- Subfamily: †Adocinae
- Genus: †Adocus; Cope, 1868

Type species
- †Adocus beatus Leidy, 1865

Species
- See text

= Adocus =

Adocus Temporal range: Early Cretaceous - Oligocene, 125–28 Ma

Extinct genus of turtles

Adocus is an extinct genus of aquatic turtles belonging to the family Adocidae.

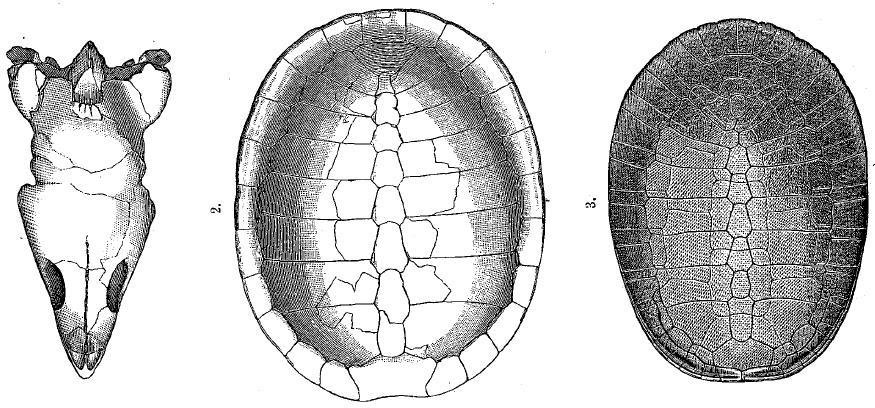
Skull and shell of Glyptops ornatus, and shell of Adocus beatus

== Description ==
Species of the genus Adocus had flattened and smoothly contoured shells with horny sculptured plates. The shells could reach a length of at least 50 centimetres (1.6 ft) for North American species, some species like A. kohaku had carapace length of 60 centimetres (2.0 ft). The largest species, A. kirtlandius had carapace reaching 113 centimetres (3.71 ft). These large freshwater turtles had an omnivorous diet. They lived from the Late Cretaceous to the Paleocene in North America, but in Asia, they were also present during the Oligocene.

== Distribution ==
These turtles have been found in Cretaceous to Paleogene of Canada, United States, Mongolia, China, Japan, Kazakhstan, Tajikistan, and Uzbekistan.

== Species ==
- Adocus agilis
- Adocus aksary
- Adocus beatus, type species (synonyms: A. punctatus, A. lacer)
- Adocus bossi
- Adocus bostobensis
- Adocus dzhurtasensis
- Adocus firmus
- Adocus foveatus
- Adocus hesperius
- Adocus kirtlandius
- Adocus kizylkumensis
- Adocus kohaku
- Adocus lineolatus
- Adocus onerosus
- Adocus orientalis
- Adocus pravus
- Adocus sengokuensis
- Adocus syntheticus
