= China-Canada Dinosaur Project =

1986-1991 dinosaur research mission

Canada-China Dinosaur Project / China-Canada Dinosaur Project
- Date: 1986–1991
- Location: Canada, China
- Participants: Canadian Museum of Nature, IVPP, Royal Tyrrell Museum of Palaeontology, Founding & Coordinating Organization - Ex Terra Foundation

The Canada-China Dinosaur Project / China-Canada Dinosaur Project (Chinese: 中国-加拿大恐龙计划; Pinyin: Zhōngguó-jiānádà kǒnglóng jìhuà; also known as Sino-Canadian Dinosaur Project) was a six-year series of palaeontological expeditions carried out by scientists from China and Canada.

== History ==
=== Background ===
In the 19th and early-20th centuries, foreign and domestic researchers, including Roy Chapman Andrews and Yang Zhongjian, made many dinosaur-related discoveries in China and Mongolia, particularly in the Gobi Desert. This changed with the rise of the Chinese Communist Party and establishment of the People's Republic of China in 1949, which saw Chinese academia reorganized and some fields, including anthropology, fall out of favour over their perceived ties to imperialism. The Institute of Vertebrate Paleontology and Paleoanthropology (IVPP) in Beijing had many of its students reassigned onto other projects, such as the Down to the Countryside Movement, but began to rebuild in the mid-1970s with the reestablishment of the institute's journal Vertebrata PalAsiatica and monumental discoveries like the Dashanpu bonebeds. Chinese palaeontologist Dong Zhiming became prominent in the organization following the death of Yang Zhongjian, his mentor and the "father of Chinese vertebrate paleontology."

The reform and opening up in China in the early 1980s led to scientific cooperation beginning between researchers in the country and abroad, drawing the attention of Canadian visionaries and researchers alike. In 1978 Provincial Museum of Alberta Palaeontologist Philip J. Currie was undertaking field reconnaissance at Dinosaur Provincial Park, where he met then-Park Interpretive Naturalist Brian Noble. The two shared a keen interest in the history of Dinosaur palaeontological expeditions lead by research institutions from both Canadian & Foreign nations. Noble and Currie together discussed the remarkable similarities of the dinosaur fauna known from southern Alberta and the Gobi Desert, leading to the shared idea of how to advance joint field expeditions to both fossil regions, in order to delve into biological-geological processes explaining those faunal similarities and differences.

Then, in 1982, while working together on establishing of the Tyrrell Museum of Palaeontology the conversation continued, with Noble, offering to work on a plan for a multi-pronged initiative that could bring the countries together, include various media projects, and assemble the ample funding that would be needed to fund such ambitious joint expeditions. Noble received an $8,300 CAD grant from the Canada Council Explorations Program, to undertake a feasibility study into this integrated scientifc-educational initiative. Noble won enthusiasm of Federal and Provincial Ministers, with further development support opening the way for of joint research missions by Canadian and Chinese palaeontologists. In 1984 Noble founded the Ex Terra Foundation, an Edmonton-based non-profit, chaired by cultural sector leader Julie Kehler. In that same year, Noble would travel to Tokyo and Beijing to meet and build strong relations with leading scientists from the Chinese Academy of Sciences, notably Prof. Zhang Meeman, Director of the IVPP (who was then visiting Japan’s National Museum of Science & Nature in Ueno Park).

Noble would remain Executive Director of Ex Terra, coordinating expedition plans with Scientific program leaders, further building support from multiple sources over his tenure until 1988. During this time Kevin Taft was brought on as CEO, serving from 1986 to 1991.

=== Creation ===
The “Canada-Canada Dinosaur Project (CCDP)” was formally launched by the Ex Terra Foundation in 1985 to organize cooperative expeditions between the Canadian Museum of Nature in Ottawa, the IVPP in Beijing, and the Tyrrell Museum of Palaeontology in Drumheller, Alberta with the support of the provincial government of Alberta, the federal government of Canada, the National Natural Science Foundation of China, and the Inner Mongolia Museum. Canadian Airlines International provided transportation to China for Canadian researchers involved in the project.

The stated mission of the Dinosaur Project was to improve the understanding of dinosaurs from North America and Asia by conducting field work in the Canadian Arctic, the Gobi Desert, the Junggar Basin, and other places of interest over the course of the following eight years. Philip J. Currie of the Tyrrell Museum of Palaeontology, Dong Zhiming of the IVPP, and Dale Russell of the Canadian Museum of Nature served as project leads for the CCDP. Dong Zhiming and Sun Ailing of the IVPP visited Alberta in October–November 1985. The project's official logo featured the English word "dinosaur" adjacent to its Chinese translation, "恐龙."

=== Field work ===
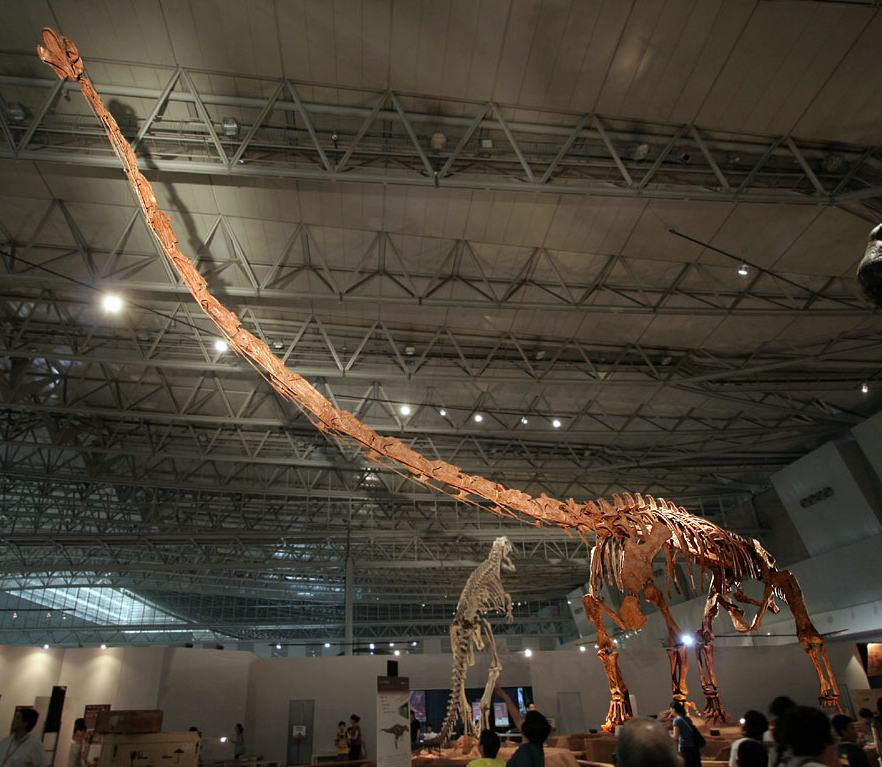
Mamenchisaurus sinocanadorum

Field work related to the Canada-China Dinosaur Project began in May 1986 with an eight-day expedition to the Gobi Desert, the first to involve Western scientists since 1930. In the early summer a larger-scale reconnaissance mission was led by Currie, Dong, and Russell in which they and their team travelled across the Gobi to identify sites of interest for dig teams in the future. This three-week excursion was the first major operation of the Dinosaur Project and marked the first use of eight Jeeps granted to the CCDP via Ex Terra by the Toronto-based Donner Canadian Foundation. The team also visited fossil sites in Alberta, Montana, and the Arctic, with their first fossil-collecting mission occurring in Dinosaur Provincial Park in July, where the project's first major find, a troodontid braincase, was made by Tang Zhilu.

The 1987 field season was extremely productive for the CCDP. Between August and October, the team uncovered fossils which would later serve as the holotypes for Mamenchisaurus sinocanadorum and Sinraptor dongi in China, and began work on the Devil's Coulee fossil site discovered earlier in the summer by Wendy Sloboda in Canada. Finds from that field attracted global media attention, garnered through media relations efforts of Ex Terra’s Brian Noble, including front page stories in the London Times and New York Times. That worldwide attention followed the Project over the ensuing years of expeditions and research.

In 1988, Dale Russell discovered the therizinosaurid Alxasaurus in the Gobi Desert. A team led by Phil Currie uncovered five juvenile Pinacosaurus at a site discovered by Brian Noble, and sixty-six protoceratopsians near the town of Bayan Mandahu, in addition to three dinosaur egg nests and an incomplete Alectrosaurus skeleton from the Iren Dabasu Formation. Two years later, further work at the site would uncover seven more juvenile Pinacosaurus in the same quarry.

The 1989 field season represented a turning point for the Dinosaur Project. Canadian researchers arrived in China and began work on dig sites in Xinjiang amid ongoing protests in Beijing's Tiananmen Square. Following the government crackdown against demonstrators on 4 June, the government of Canada ordered all of its citizens in China to return home, cutting that year's field season short. Canadian scientists returned to China again in 1990 to continue excavating at dig sites identified on earlier expeditions, and noteworthy discoveries were made on a near-daily basis. An extraordinarily well-preserved cycadophyte fossil was discovered near Urad Houqi in 1990, sixty years after the Sino-Swedish Expeditions (1927–1935) had uncovered fossils at the same site in 1930. By the time CCDP researchers returned to Canada in August, the organization had already determined there would be no further missions to China. Later that summer a handful of Canadian sites failed to produce any notable fossils. A final expedition was made to Dinosaur Provincial Park and Grande Cache in 1991, during one of the most successful field seasons in the history of the Royal Tyrrell Museum. Chinese researcher Tang Zhilu, who had made the first major discovery of the CCDP, made one of the last discoveries of the project when he uncovered an ankylosaurid skull belonging to Edmontonia.

With the conclusion of the 1991 field season, the China-Canada Dinosaur Project ended six years into their eight-year mandate. The CCDP produced an enormous amount of fossils, with over fifteen tonnes of fossil material collected in Canada and another sixty tonnes in China.

== Impact ==
=== Discoveries ===
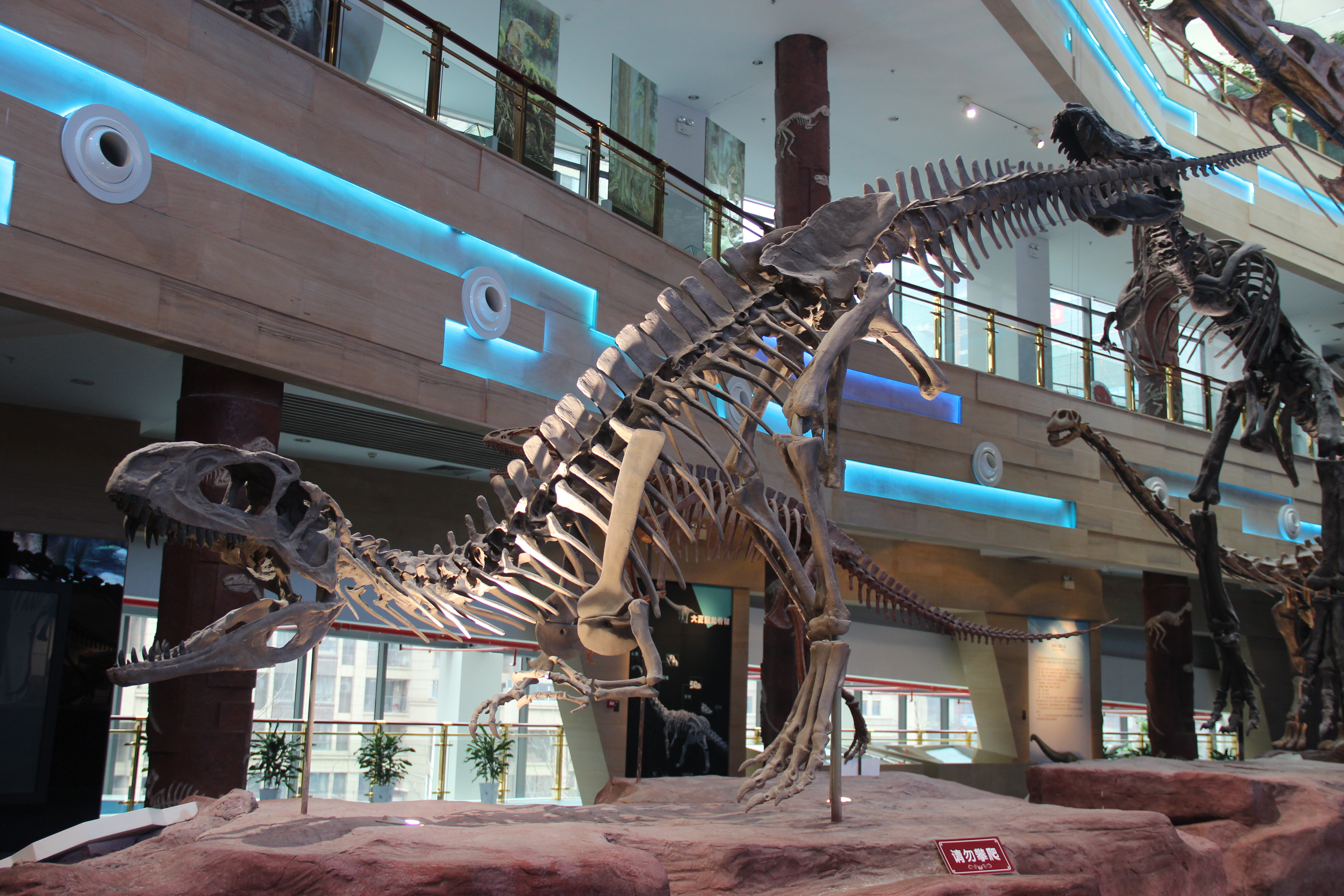
Sinraptor dongi

New dinosaur taxa described by the China-Canada Dinosaur Project include Alxasaurus, Bellusaurus, Mamenchisaurus sinocanadorum, Monolophosaurus, Sinornithoides, Sinraptor, and Wuerhosaurus ordosensis. An incomplete skeleton recovered from Pingfengshan in 1989 is believed to be an unidentified species of Euhelopus. The project also described non-dinosaurian fossils such as the turtles Khunnuchelys, Ordosemys, and Zangerlia neimongolensis; the crocodyliforms Rugosuchus and Sunosuchus junggarensis; the crocodilian Borealosuchus griffithi; the trace fossil Fictovichnus; and an unidentified atoposaurid tentatively assigned to the genus Theriosuchus. The CCDP also produced six distinct types of fossilized embryos believed to belong to the protoceratopsians Protoceratops and Bagaceratops.

In addition to specimens recovered in the field, CCDP researchers also reanalyzed fossil material that had gone ignored following earlier expeditions. This includes a partially-complete ankylosaur skull discovered in 1959 or 1960 by a multinational expedition made up of Chinese and Soviet researchers but which was placed into storage and never properly described. The skull was rediscovered while searching for fossils to feature in the Dinosaur Project's touring show; in 2001, it was made the holotype for a new genus of dinosaur: Gobisaurus.

A survey conducted of the Djadochta Formation during the CCDP dated the formation to the Campanian age of the Late Cretaceous.

=== Chinese response ===
The National Natural Science Foundation of China was founded in 1986 in conjunction with the China-Canada Dinosaur Project and reflected on the program's successes at an international palaeontology symposium which ran from 10 to 12 October 2001 to celebrate the foundation's fifteenth anniversary. Even after the CCDP ended, some Canadian and Chinese palaeontologists continued to work together, resulting in the description of newly named dinosaurs like Gobisaurus and the reevaluation of known genera such as Shanshanosaurus.

After the CCPD concluded, Chinese institutions were quick to begin collaborating with other foreign bodies, resulting in three additional dinosaur projects being launched in the 1990s: the Sino-Japan Silk Road Dinosaur Expedition (1992–1993), the China-Japan-Mongolia Mongolian Plateau Expedition (1995–1999), and the Sino-Belgium Dinosaur Project (1995–2001). Zhao Xijin and other participants in the CCDP continued to lead multinational expeditions to the Gobi Desert for years after the project ended.

Dale Russell, one of the CCDP's leaders, departed from the Canadian Museum of Nature in the years after the Dinosaur Project concluded and was replaced by fellow Dinosaur Project researcher Wu Xiaochun.

=== Western response ===
At the conclusion of the 1990 field season, Ex Terra Foundation CEO Kevin Taft was quoted as saying, "This concludes one of the biggest hunts in history." Peter Dodson, an American palaeontologist from the University of Pennsylvania, called the China-Canada Dinosaur Project "a very significant expedition." Phillip J. Currie, one of the project's leads, attributed the ongoing collaboration between Canadian and Chinese populations to the relationships established during the CCDP and referred to the project as a high point in the careers of all involved. Another project lead, Dale Russell, described working in the Gobi Desert as "like being on another planet. You have a wonderful feeling of time, of antiquity."

In recognition of shared customs between the Indigenous peoples in Canada and China, the Indian Association of Alberta (IAA) organized a symbolic exchange of tipis from the Peigen Reserve (now Piikani 147) and yurts from Kazakhs living in Inner Mongolia. The tipis were presented by Piikani elder Joe Crowshoe Sr. at a research site in China in September 1987 at a ceremony which, following the tipi raising, featured a series of cultural events including horse races and dancing. A lack of funding resulted in the IAA and the Ex Terra Foundation initially cancelling the event before additional funding was secured.

Less than five years after opening and after four years participating in the CCDP, the Tyrrell Museum of Palaeontology received the title "Royal" from Queen Elizabeth II on 28 June 1990 near the start of the 1990 field season.

The CCDP was the subject of the 1993 non-fiction book The Dinosaur Project by Wayne Grady.

In 1996, the Royal Tyrrell Museum put on a special exhibit entitled "Kong-Long: Dinosaurs from the Gobi" which covered discoveries made by the CCDP and other researchers in the Gobi Desert. To promote a 2013 Pacific National Exhibition attraction based on Genghis Khan, science journalist Don "Dino Don" Lessem travelled to China and Mongolia with the radio show Ideas and revisited the site where Mamenchisaurus sinocanadorum was discovered by the CCDP in 1987 as part of the program.

== Dinosaur Project World Tour ==
=== Preparation ===
One of the largest science exhibitions in history was organized by the Ex Terra Foundation to showcase dinosaur fossils from China and Canada, with a heavy focus on those discovered by the CCDP. The show was alternatively known as "The Dinosaur Project," "The Greatest Show Unearthed" and "The Dinosaur Project World Tour," and was meant to raise funding for non-fiction books and documentaries that covered the research done by the CCDP.

Work began on the touring show in 1986. A preliminary analysis conducted by the Harrison Price Company to determine the possible financial returns of the project was completed in 1989 and projected that the Dinosaur Project exhibition could draw 900 to 3,200 daily visitors in North American markets and 6,000 to 10,000 in Japan. In preparation for the show, Ex Terra acquired archived fossil material from historic expeditions in China, leading to the rediscovery of previously overlooked fossils such as a skull which was later made the holotype for Gobisaurus. Some names used to identify fossils featured in the show, such as "Gobisaurus" and "Sinornithoides," had not been published in academic literature at the time of the show. As a result, these names were considered nomen nudum until they were described in official publications.

=== Tour ===
The show was originally scheduled to tour Canada, the United States, Europe, Australia, and Japan in 1990, but was delayed multiple times. Officials announced in October 1990 that Edmonton would host the premiere showing of the Dinosaur Project World Tour from 15 May to 5 July 1992 before moving on to Toronto; other locales which had been considered to host the show were Calgary, Ottawa, and Winnipeg. The government of Alberta contributed $1.94 million CAD towards the Edmonton portion of the tour. Ultimately, the event was delayed again and went forward in 1993, premiering in Edmonton before travelling to Toronto. The show made its international debut in Osaka in 1994 and then appeared in Singapore and Vancouver in 1995 before moving on to Sydney for the summer of 1996–1997. The show also appeared in Dallas, Milwaukee, and Winnipeg. In 1997, the Ex Terra Foundation ended the tour and sold many of its assets to the Royal Tyrrell Museum. Of the eleven cities suggested as venues by a 1989 consultation with the Harrison Price Company, only Dallas and Toronto ever hosted the show.

The opening of the Edmonton show was attended by Ralph Klein, Premier of Alberta; Donald H. Sparrow, Minister of Economic Development and Tourism; Dianne Mirosh, Minister of Innovation and Science; and Tom Musgrove, MLA for the Bow Valley electoral district. Mirosh and Musgrove were critical of the show, saying it lacked sufficient recognition for Dinosaur Provincial Park's contributions to palaeontology. The show was also derided as "Bedrock meets Epcot" by critics as it toured Canada. However, Deputy Premier Ken Kowalski repeatedly defended the show and deemed it a success. During an October 1993 meeting of the Alberta Legislative Assembly, Kowalski deemed dinosaurs one of Alberta's primary tourist attractions:

Most of the reviews that are done clearly indicate that people are fascinated by three things in the province of Alberta. They're fascinated by RCMP with red serge coats, they're fascinated by the Rocky Mountains, and they're absolutely fascinated by dinosaurs. There's something international about a dinosaur, and of course Alberta is really the great home of the dinosaur.

=== Features ===
Fossils featured prominently in the tour included samples from a Centrosaurus bonebed, a Daspletosaurus skull, a well-preserved ornithomimid, a nearly-complete Prosaurolophus skeleton, a stone slab containing twelve juvenile Pinacosaurus, a Mamenchisaurus skeleton, and a Tyrannosaurus skeleton known as "Black Beauty." A number of artistic recreations were prepared for the tour, including a life-size Albertosaurus sculpture created by Canadian palaeoartist Brian Cooley. Many of the sculptures and other palaeoart used in the tour were acquired by the Royal Tyrrell Museum in 1997 and have been periodically reused by the museum and other touring exhibitions.

The exhibition was set up in each locale under large tents and consisted of several areas. The Great Hall, or "Boneworks," featured not only dinosaur fossils but an interactive centre for children and several tables where guests could engage with CCDP researchers. The final product also featured a recreation of one team's field camp.

== Formations visited by year ==
=== 1986 ===
- Eureka Sound Group, Ellesmere Island, Northwest Territories (now Nunavut)
- Isachsen Formation, Axel Heiberg Island, Northwest Territories (now Nunavut)
- Judith River Formation, Dinosaur Provincial Park, Alberta
- Shishugou Formation, Jiangjunmiao, Xinjiang

=== 1987 ===
- Ejinhoro Formation, Ordos, Inner Mongolia
- Tugulu Group, Xinjiang

=== 1988 ===
- Bayan Mandahu Formation, Urad Rear Banner, Inner Mongolia
- Bayin-Gobi Formation, Alxa League, Inner Mongolia
- Ejinhoro Formation, Ejin Horo Banner, Inner Mongolia
- Iren Dabasu Formation, Erenhot, Inner Mongolia
- Shishugou Formation, Jiangjunmiao, Xinjiang
- Tugulu Group, Xinjiang

=== 1989 ===
- Eureka Sound Group, Ellesmere Island, Northwest Territories (now Nunavut)
- Kanguk Formation, Bylot Island, Northwest Territories (now Nunavut)
- Shishugou Formation, Jiangjunmiao, Xinjiang
- Wucaiwan Formation, Jimsar, Xinjiang

=== 1990 ===
- Bayan Mandahu Formation, Urad Rear Banner, Inner Mongolia
- Ejinhoro Formation, Ordos, Inner Mongolia
- Gates Formation, Grande Cache, Alberta
- Iren Dabasu Formation, Erenhot, Inner Mongolia
- Shishugou Formation, Jiangjunmiao, Xinjiang

=== 1991 ===
- Judith River Formation, Dinosaur Provincial Park, Alberta
