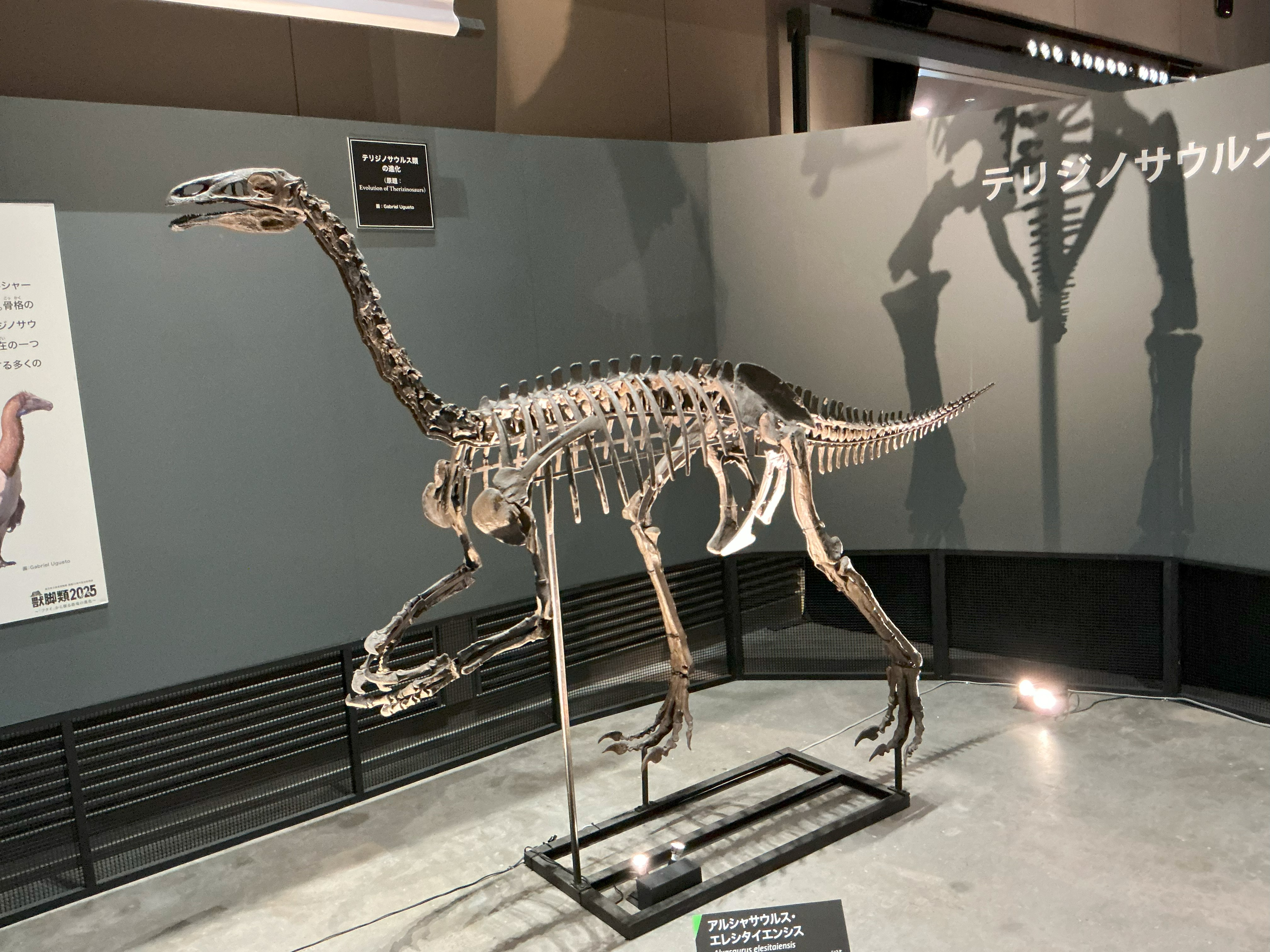
- Skeletal mount at the Fukui Prefectural Dinosaur Museum

Scientific classification
- Kingdom: Animalia
- Phylum: Chordata
- Class: Reptilia
- Clade: Dinosauria
- Clade: Saurischia
- Clade: Theropoda
- Clade: †Therizinosauria
- Superfamily: †Therizinosauroidea
- Genus: †Alxasaurus; Russell & Dong, 1993

Type species
- †Alxasaurus elesitaiensis Russell & Dong, 1993

= Alxasaurus =

Alxasaurus Temporal range: Albian, ~113–100.5 Ma

Therizinosauroid dinosaur genus from the Early Cretaceous

Alxasaurus (/ˌɑːlʃəˈsɔːrəs/; meaning "Alxa lizard") is a genus of therizinosauroid theropod dinosaurs from the Early Cretaceous (Albian age) Bayin-Gobi Formation of Inner Mongolia. It is known from five specimens, recovered from the Bayin-Gobi in 1988, as part of the China-Canada Dinosaur Project. During their preparation, palaeontologists Dong Zhiming and Dale Russell noted strong similarities to Segnosaurus. In 1993, they described Alxasaurus and named its type species, A. elesitaiensis. While therizinosaurs had previously been tentatively seen as late-surviving basal sauropodomorphs, the description of Alxasaurus lent credence to the idea that they were instead highly derived coelurosaurs.

While outside of Therizinosauridae itself, Alxasaurus had many of the traits characteristic of derived therizinosaurs, such as an abbreviated tail, shortened metatarsals and broad feet convergent with those of basal sauropodomorphs, and fairly long, recurved hand claws. Like related genera, it likely would have had a beak and a large gut, both adaptations for a herbivorous diet.

== History of discovery ==
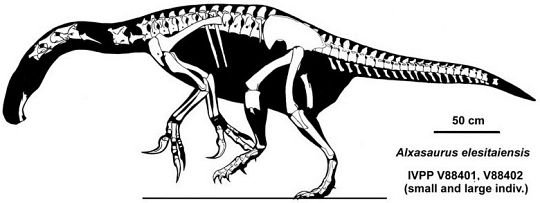
Skeletal composite of specimens

Between 21 August and 2 September 1988, an expedition to the Bayin-Gobi Formation, in Inner Mongolia, was carried out by as part of the China-Canada Dinosaur Project. The expedition uncovered five theropod specimens: IVPP 88402, actually two specimens (one larger and one smaller); IVP 88301, consisting of scattered axial elements; IVPP 88510, consisting of limb elements; and IVP 88501. The specimens were transported to the Institute of Vertebrate Paleontology and Paleoanthropology in Beijing. While the specimens were under preparation, Dong Zhiming noted similarities to Segnosaurus. This conclusion was supported by his Canadian colleague Dale Russell, who notified George Olshevsky that the specimen provided "conclusive evidence" that segnosaurs were derived theropods. This contradicted the contemporary view that segnosaurs were late-surviving basal sauropodomorphs. In a paper released in the last issue of the 1993 volume of the Canadian Journal of Earth Sciences, Russell and Dong described the Alxa specimens, assigning them the binomial name Alxasaurus elesitaiensis. The genus is named after the Alxa Desert of Inner Mongolia, also known as the "Alashan" desert, and the name also includes the Greek word sauros ("lizard"). Alxa (or Alashan) is also the name of the league, or administrative division, of the Inner Mongolia (Nei Mongol Zizhiqu) region of the People's Republic of China. The single known species, elesitaiensis, is named after Elesitai, a village found in this region, near which the fossil remains of Alxasaurus were located. The larger IVPP 88402 specimen was designated as the holotype, while the others were designated as paratypes. Together, they represent most of the species hypodigm, aside from the skull.

== Description ==
Size comparison

Alxasaurus is among the earliest known members of the Therizinosauroidea, but it already possessed the body shape — including the long neck, short tail, and relatively large claws — of later therizinosauroids. Like other members of this group, it was a bipedal herbivore with a large gut to process plant material. The five Alxasaurus specimens all vary in size. In 1993, Russell and Dong estimated a body length of 3.8 m (12 ft), a hip height of 1.5 m (4.9 ft), and a body mass of 380 kg (840 lb). In 2010, Gregory S. Paul estimated its length to be 4 m (13 ft), and its body mass to be 400 kg (880 lb).

=== Mandible and lower dentition ===
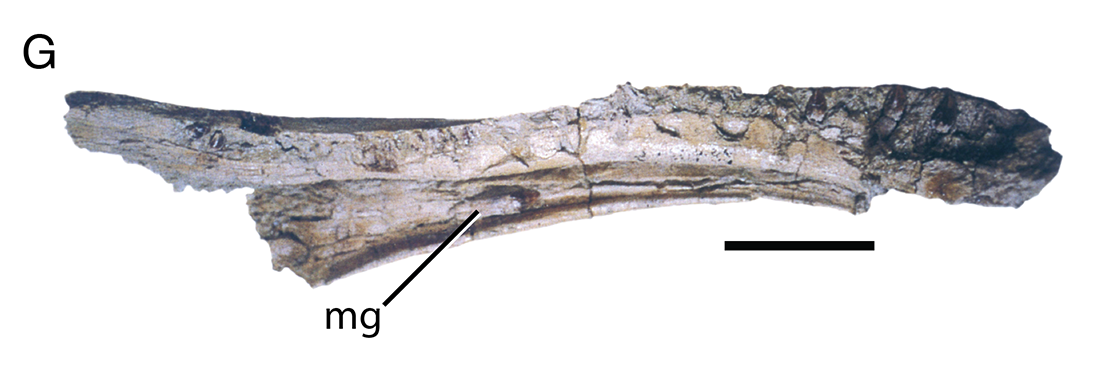
Left dentary of the holotype

The skull of Alxasaurus is represented solely by a moderately well-preserved right dentary, belonging to the holotype. The alveolar margin, the part of the dentary that bore teeth, measured 18.5 cm (7.3 in) in length. Several teeth, all partly erupted, are preserved, though there was room for around forty teeth (more than the thirty-one of Erlikosaurus and the twenty-four of Segnosaurus). The teeth in the anterior (front) half of the alveolar margin bore between eight and ten denticles on the anterior carinae; those posterior to (rearward of) those teeth had similar denticle shapes and sizes, though their exact number is unclear. Though poorly preserved, interdental plates appear to have been present. While not preserved in Alxasaurus, its presence in other therizinosaurs suggests that a beak likely would have been present.

=== Postcranial skeleton ===
The cervical (neck) vertebrae of Alxasaurus' holotype are badly crushed, though as far as can be gathered, their centra were amphiplatyan, meaning that their surfaces were relatively flat at both ends. Their neural spines were small and narrow. The zygapophyses, the articular processes of the vertebrae, were broad, and curved anteroventrally (forward and downward). From either side of the anterior (front) portion of the vertebral centra, alar processes extended, bearing capitular facets. The smaller IVPP 88402 specimen preserves three articulated vertebrae, two from the base of the neck, and one being the first dorsal (back) vertebra. The latter had a more robust neural spine than any of the preceding vertebrae, intermediate morphologically between the cervical and dorsal vertebrae. The zygapophyses of the dorsal vertebrae had planes of articulation that sloped medially, and the prezygapophyses were buttressed by the roof of the neural canal. The sacrum is very crushed. The sacral vertebrae have centra that are relatively flat ventrally (at the bottom), diminishing in size the more posterior they were. As in Segnosaurus, the sacral spines did not extend above the highest point of the ilium. Alxasaurus' caudal (tail) series is fairly well-preserved, though some of the distal (far) vertebrae are absent. From what can be gathered, the vertebral count was decreased. Like other therizinosaurs, the tail was short, relative to that of other theropods.

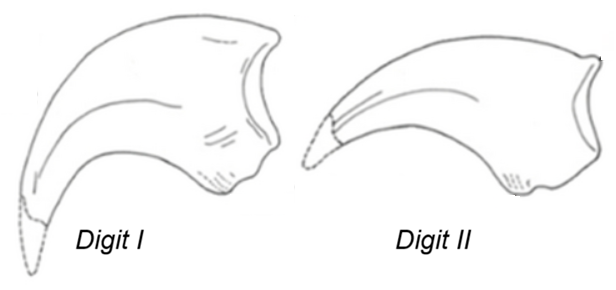
Manual ungual digits I and II of A. elesitaiensis

The scapula of Alxasaurus was long and slender, and its blade was only slightly extended distally. The anteroproximal (front, near the body axis) margin is not preserved. The posterior part of the coronoid was subcircular, tapering to a blunt point. The acrocoracoid process was situated close to the ventral margin of the glenoid articulation. The arm bones were crushed, and so details of the humerus, radius and ulna are difficult to discern. The manus (hand), on the other hand, is preserved in detail, though the manual phalanges (digit bones; in this case, finger bones) are disarticulated and have incomplete shafts. The distal carpals, the bones of the wrist closest to the hand itself, were similar to those of Therizinosaurus, though the second distal carpal had an additional articular lobe on its posterior surface. The metacarpals, the bones of the manus itself, were also very similar to those of Therizinosaurus, though less powerfully constructed. The phalanges bore ligament pits which extended to the medial surfaces, unlike in that genus. Overall, the phalanges were very similar to those of Segnosaurus. The unguals (claws) were badly crushed, partly because they were hollow proximally. They were similar in shape to those of Deinocheirus, but were narrower. In comparison to taxa like Therizinosaurus, they were small, and likely served a more generalised function.

The anterior portion of the ilium is unpreserved, as is the pubis. Dorsal to the posterodistal end of the ilium was a large crest, probably homologous to a rugose area found in the same position in Segnosaurus. Two flattened, strap-like elements are preserved, tentatively interpreted as ischia. The shaft of Alxasaurus' femur was slightly bowed laterally, unlike in Segnosaurus, where it was straight. The femoral head is inclined dorsomedially. The bones of the tarsus (ankle) are unknown. Many pedal (foot) elements are known, though identifications are largely dubious. The proximal end of the third metatarsal was probably broad, as in Segnosaurus. The metatarsus overall was abbreviated, converging on basal sauropodomorphs. The foot overall was likely quite broad.

== Classification ==
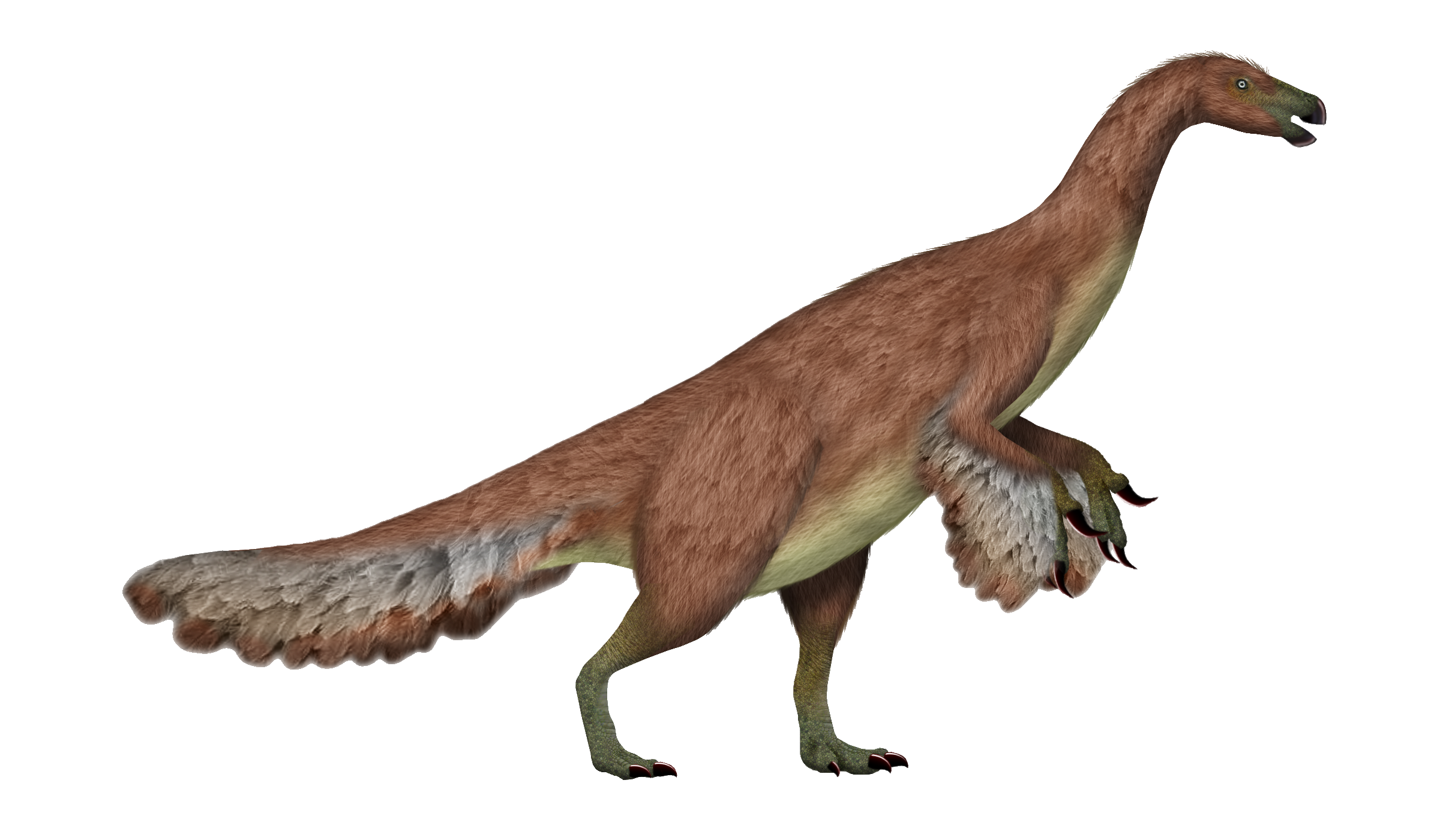
Life reconstruction

While exhibiting many typical therizinosaur features in overall body shape and in the teeth, the skeleton of Alxasaurus also shows several features present in more typical theropods, and the discovery of this animal provided significant evidence that therizinosaurs were aberrant theropods. Specifically, the semilunate carpal bone of the wrist is found only in maniraptoran theropods, which also include oviraptorosaurs, dromaeosaurs, troodontids, and birds. Even more basal therizinosaurs such as the feathered Beipiaosaurus and primitive Falcarius have since been discovered with more theropod features and have helped to solidify this arrangement. Alxasaurus is now thought to occupy a position between the early Beipiaosaurus and later therizinosaurids such as Erlikosaurus, Segnosaurus, or Therizinosaurus.

Although Rusell and Dong coined the Alxasauridae to contain Alxasaurus, the family has not been widely corroborated in most analyses. In 2010, Lindsay E. Zanno noted that, while technically still valid, the group currently consists of only a single species and is thus of dubious utility.

The following cladogram is based on the phylogenetic analysis conducted by Hartman et al., 2019:

- Therizinosauria
  - Falcarius
  - - Jianchangosaurus
    - Therizinosauroidea
      - Beipiaosaurus
      - - "Chilantaisaurus" zheziangensis
        - Enigmosaurus
        - Alxasaurus
        - Therizinosauridae

== See also ==
- Timeline of therizinosaur research
