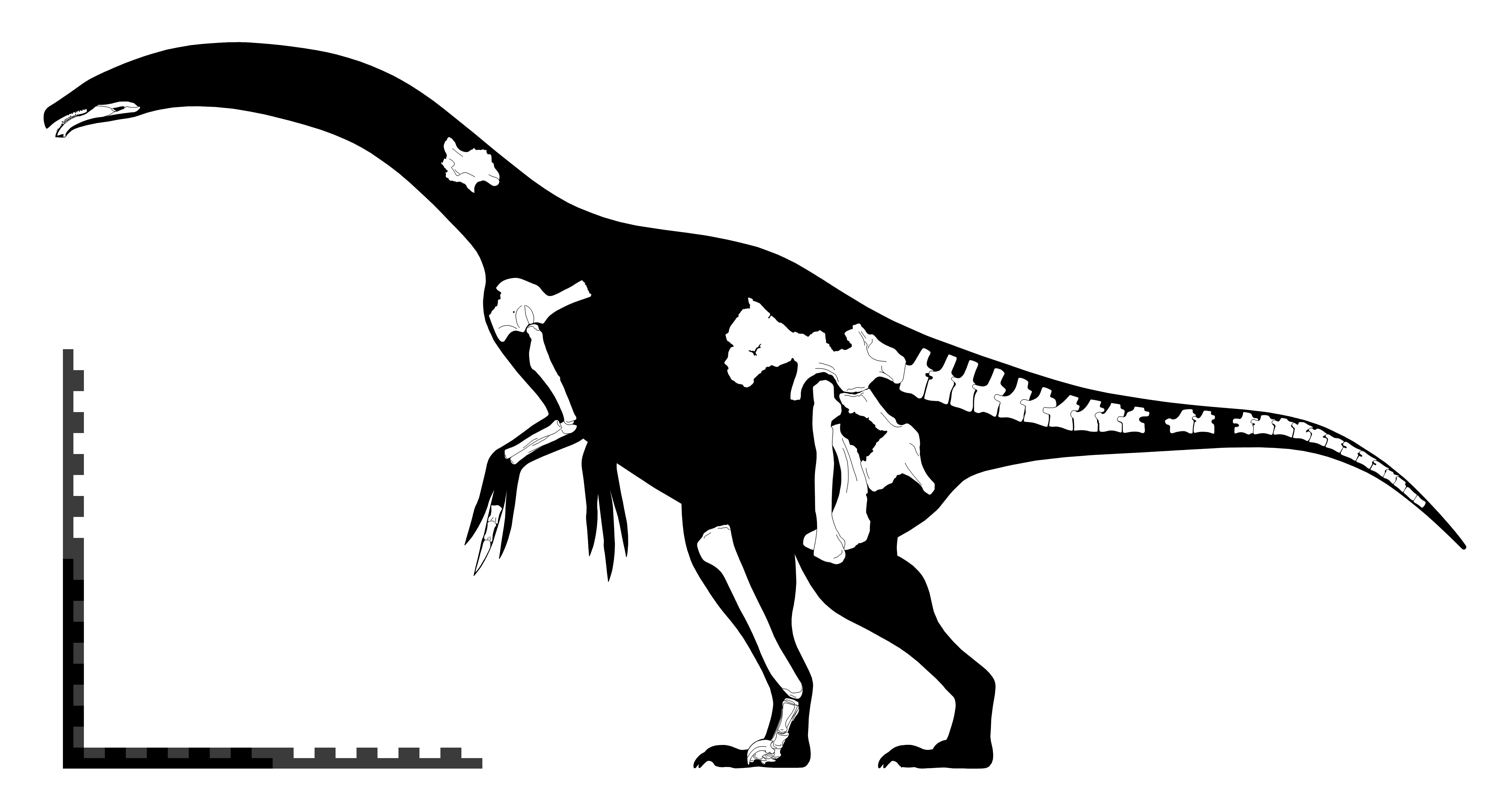
- Diagram showing known remains

Scientific classification
- Kingdom: Animalia
- Phylum: Chordata
- Class: Reptilia
- Clade: Dinosauria
- Clade: Saurischia
- Clade: Theropoda
- Family: †Therizinosauridae
- Genus: †Segnosaurus; Perle, 1979
- Species: †S. galbinensis

Binomial name
- †Segnosaurus galbinensis Perle, 1979

= Segnosaurus =

Segnosaurus Temporal range: Late Cretaceous, 90 Ma

Extinct genus of therizinosaurid dinosaur from late Cretaceous

Segnosaurus is a genus of therizinosaurid dinosaur that lived in what is now southeastern Mongolia during the Late Cretaceous, about 102–86 million years ago. Multiple incomplete but well-preserved specimens were discovered in the Gobi Desert in the 1970s, and in 1979 the genus and species Segnosaurus galbinensis were named. The generic name Segnosaurus means "slow lizard" and the specific name galbinensis refers to the Galbin region. The known material of this dinosaur includes the lower jaw, neck and tail vertebrae, the pelvis, shoulder girdle, and limb bones. Parts of the specimens have gone missing or become damaged since they were collected. Remains from Japan originally assigned to Allosaurus were reassigned to Segnosaurus sp. (of unspecified species) in 2025.

Segnosaurus was a large-bodied therizinosaur that is estimated to have been about 6–7 m (20–23 ft) long and to have weighed about 1.3 t (1.4 short tons). It would have been bipedal, with the trunk of its body tilted upwards. The head was small with a beak at the tip of the jaws, and the neck was long and slender. The lower jaw was down-turned at the front and the teeth were distinct in having additional denticles as well as third cutting edges in some of the hindmost teeth. The forelimbs were robust and had three fingers which bore large claws, and the feet had four toes supporting the foot—apart from therizinosaurs, all theropods had three-toed feet. The front of the pelvis was adapted to support the enlarged belly. The pubic bone was turned backwards, a feature that is only seen in birds and the dinosaurs most closely related to them.

The affinities of Segnosaurus were originally obscure and it received its own theropod family, Segnosauridae, and later when related genera were identified, an infraorder, Segnosauria. Alternative classification schemes were proposed until more complete relatives were described in the 1990s, which confirmed them as theropods. The new fossils also showed Segnosauridae was a junior synonym of the earlier named family Therizinosauridae. Segnosaurus and its relatives are thought to have been slow-moving animals that, as indicated by their unusual features, were mainly herbivorous, whereas most other theropod groups were carnivorous. Therizinosaurs probably used their long forelimbs, long necks, and beaks when browsing, and large guts for processing food. Segnosaurus is known from the Bayan Shireh Formation, where it lived alongside the fellow therizinosaurs Erlikosaurus and Enigmosaurus; these related genera were probably niche partitioned.

== History of discovery ==
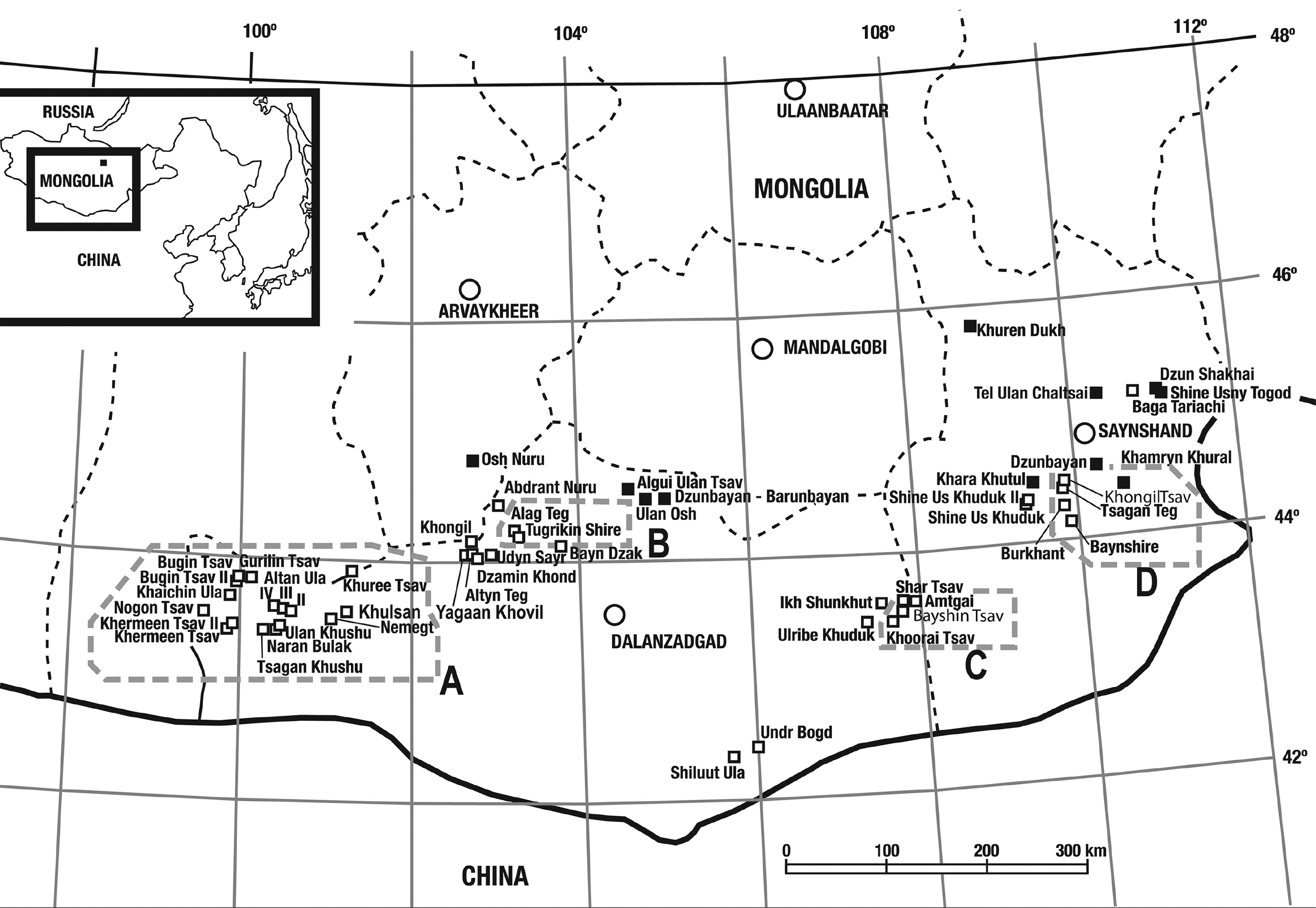
Cretaceous-aged dinosaur fossil localities of Mongolia; Segnosaurus was found by areas C and D (right, Amtgay and Khara-Khutul localities).

In 1973, a joint Soviet–Mongolian expedition investigating the Bayan Shireh Formation at the Amtgay locality in the Gobi Desert of southeastern Mongolia discovered fossils that included the partial skeleton of an unknown dinosaur. Through 1974 and 1975, more remains were uncovered at the Amtgay and Khara-Khutul localities; though the skeletons were incomplete, the recovered bones were well-preserved. Other localities listed in the literature include Bayshin-Tsav and Urilbe-Khuduk. These fossils were scientifically described in 1979 by the paleontologist Altangerel Perle, who named the new genus and species Segnosaurus galbiensis. The generic name is derived from the Latin word segnis ("slow") and the Ancient Greek sauros ("lizard"). The specific name refers to the Galbin region of the Gobi Desert.

The holotype specimen from the Amtgay locality is housed at the Mongolian Academy of Sciences under the specimen number IGM 100/80 (Mongolian Institute of Geology, formerly GIN). It includes the mandible (lower jaws), an incomplete humerus, a complete radius and ulna (lower arm bones), phalanges of the fingers, a forelimb ungual (claw bone), an almost-complete pelvis, an incomplete right femur, six sacral vertebrae, ten caudal vertebrae from the front of the tail, fifteen from the hindmost part of the tail, the first gastral rib, and fragments of the dorsal ribs. Two more specimens were designated as paratype specimens; specimen IGM 100/82 from the Khara Khutul locality includes a femur, tibia and fibula (leg bones), tarsals and metatarsals, five toe phalanges including a foot ungual, rib fragments, complete ilia, the upper portion of an ischium, and the lower portion of a pubis. Specimen IGM 100/83 includes a left scapulocoracoid (shoulder girdle), a radius, an ulna, forelimb unguals, and a fragment of a cervical (neck) vertebra. In 1980, Perle and the paleontologist Rinchen Barsbold assigned another specimen to Segnosaurus; IGM 100/81 from the Amtgay locality included a left tibia and fibula.

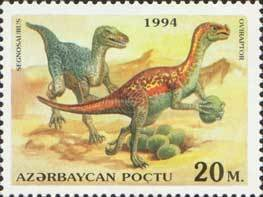
1994 stamp of Azerbaijan with an outdated life restoration of Segnosaurus (left) and Oviraptor based on the fragmentary remains known at the time

In 1983, Barsbold listed additional specimens GIN 100/87 and 100/88. In 2010, however, the paleontologist Lindsay E. Zanno suggested these may refer to paratypes IGM 100/82 and IGM 100/83 (which had already been listed in 1979) because the Russian-to-English translation of Barsbold's article has several typographical errors in regard to specimen numbers. Zanno also noted that by the time of her study, there were numerous problems with the Segnosaurus IGM specimens, including damage caused since collection, the disappearance of elements of the holotype, incorrect identification of assigned elements, and more than one individual bearing the same specimen number. Holotype elements Zanno was able to access in 2010 included a severely damaged ilium, a sacrum missing the left sacral ribs with damage so it could not conjoin well with the rest of the ilium, and a pubic bone and ischium missing their upper portions. More bones bearing the specimen number IGM 100/82 were located but were not mentioned in Perle's description, while the whereabouts of some paratype elements was unknown. In a 2016 re-description of the holotype mandible, which had been little studied since 1979, Zanno and colleagues reported the majority of the tooth crowns had been damaged after collection, and most of them were missing their tips. Of the two hemimandibles (halves of the lower jaw), the right is nearly complete; only the hindmost part and the upper front of its mandibular symphysis (the area where the halves of the mandible meet) was missing. The left hemimandible is fragmented and preserves the front part with some displacement of bone due to crushing.

In 1991, the paleontologist Minoru Tamura and colleagues reported vertebrae, limb bones, and teeth from the Late Cretaceous Jobu Formation of Kumamoto, Japan, which they assigned to Allosaurus sp. (of unspecified species), which would make it the youngest representative of that genus. The paleontologists André Burigo and Octávio Mateus instead found the femur similar to that of to Segnosaurus in 2025, and noted that other therizinosaur remains were known from the site, and they therefore reassigned these remains to Segnosaurus sp.

== Description ==
Size compared to a human

Segnosaurus was a large-bodied therizinosaur that is estimated to have been about 6–7 m (20–23 ft) long and to have weighed about 1.3 t (1.4 short tons). Campione & Evans in 2020, however, calculated its body mass at 4.17 metric tons (4.60 short tons). Segnosaurus is incompletely known, but as a therizinosaurid, it would have been bipedal and robustly built with the trunk of the body tilted upwards compared to other theropods. The head would have been small with a rhamphotheca (horny beak) at the tip of the jaws, and a long, slender neck. The fingers were not particularly long, but bore large claws. The front of the pelvis was adapted to support the enlarged belly. Therizinosaurs are known to have had simple, primitive feathers as evidenced by fossils of the basal (or "primitive") genera Beipiaosaurus—the second-known non-bird dinosaur preserved with such integuments after Sinosauropteryx—and Jianchangosaurus. Since most therizinosaurs are incompletely known, it is uncertain how many of the anatomical features that are used to distinguish Segnosaurus are widespread among the group; many genera cannot be directly compared because the equivalent bones are not preserved.

=== Mandible and lower dentition ===
The mandible of Segnosaurus was low and elongated, yet relatively robust and shapeless compared to that of Erlikosaurus, which was more gracile. The nearly complete right hemimandible (half of the mandible) is 379 mm (14.9 in) long from front to back, 55.5 mm (2.19 in) at the highest point, and 24.5 mm (0.96 in) at the lowest. The dentary bone, the tooth-bearing bone forming most of the mandible's front part, was complex in shape compared to those of early therizinosaurs. The tooth-bearing part was almost rectangular and sloped downwards in side view with a pronounced arc throughout the upper length of the front end—more extreme than what is known in other therizinosaurs. The front-most part of the dentary was strongly deflected downwards at about a 30-degree angle, a unique feature for this genus. When each hemimandible is articulated with the other, they form a broadly U-shaped, toothless mandibular symphysis that projects upwards towards the front as in Erlikosaurus and Neimongosaurus. The expansive, toothless front region of the dentary spans 25.5 mm (1.00 in) on the right hemimandible of the holotype. Proportionally, the toothless part of the dentary is 20% of its tooth row, which is 150.3 mm (5.92 in) long. By comparison, the toothless region of Erlikosaurus was about 12% of the tooth row's length and was almost absent in Jianchangosaurus. The height of the dentary diminished towards the hindmost extend of the tooth row, whereafter it sharply fanned out to contact the surangular bone behind it; by contrast, the hind part of the dentary in Erlikosaurus gradually approached the surangular in a gentle arc.

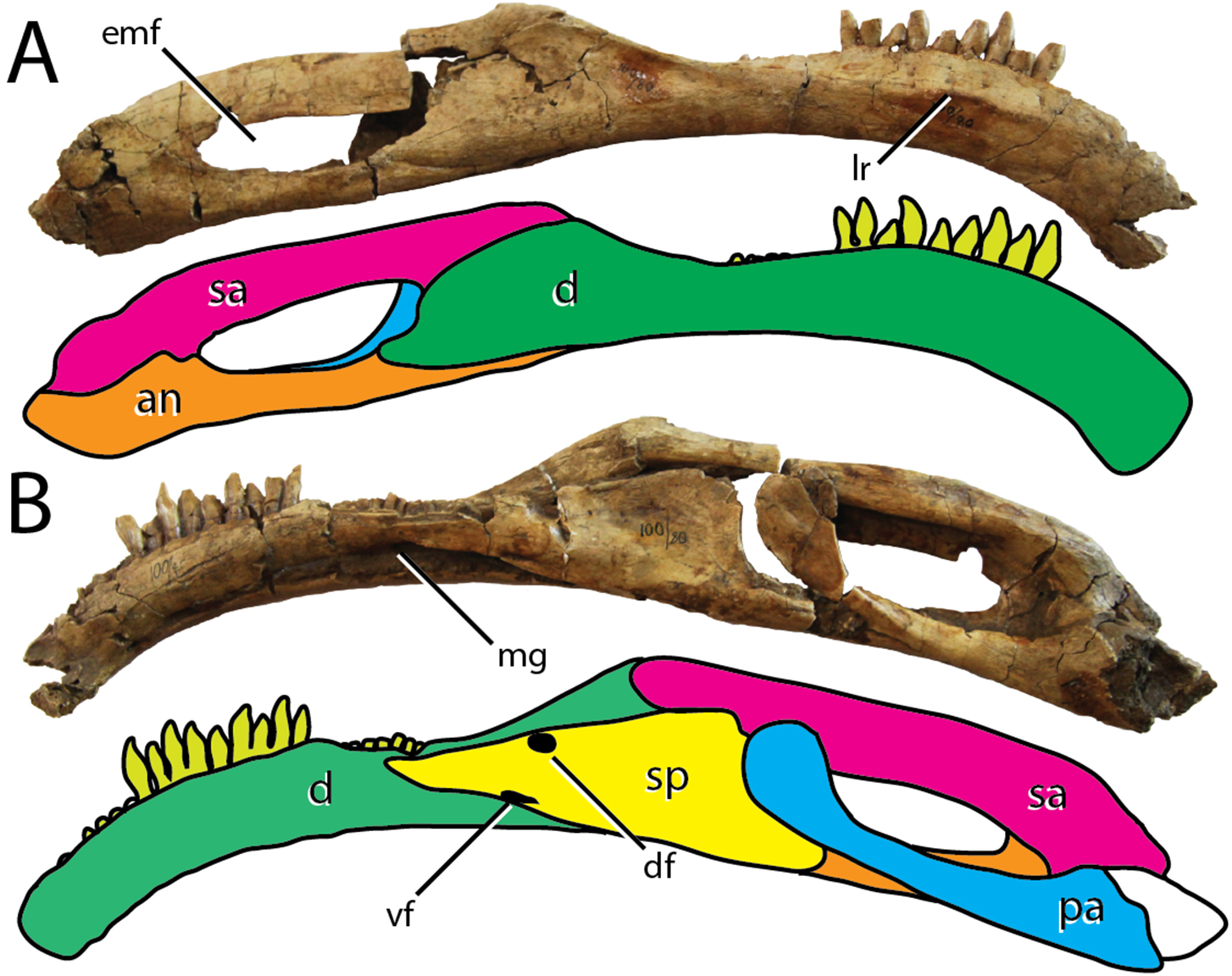
Right half of the holotype mandible in outer and inner view, with component bones marked by different colors; the dentary bone (green) bore the teeth.

Segnosaurus was distinct among therizinosaurs in that the hindmost part of the dentary was toothless. The teeth were restricted to the front two-thirds of the dentary, which bore 24 alveoli (tooth sockets) in a manner similar to Jianchangosaurus but different from Erlikosaurus, in which nearly the entire dentary was toothed, bearing 31 alveoli. The tooth row of Segnosaurus was inset and demarcated by a shelf on the outer side as it was in all derived (or "advanced") therizinosaurs. Unlike in other related taxa, the shelf was restricted to the hind part of the dentary and the raised rim that defined it was not as pronounced. Segnosaurus was unique in having a low ridge rising between the fifth and fourteenth alveoli that divided the dentary into two almost-equally sized front and hind parts. Just above this ridge, the dentary was pierced by a row of foramina as in Jianchangosaurus and Alxasaurus, which became less regular by the region around the mandibular symphysis, where the two halves of the mandible met at the front. This row was instead directly in line with and on the side of the ridge in Erlikosaurus. The Meckelian groove that ran along the inner side of the mandible, was placed further down than in Erlikosaurus and had a consistent depth until the thirteenth tooth position, whereafter it widened. The lower jaw elements behind the dentary (the splenial, surangular, angular, and prearticular bones) were distinct from those of other therizinosaurs, being gracile and linear, and contributing to the hind part of the hemimandible being elongate and almost rectangular. The surangular was long and sword-shaped, the angular was wing-like in shape, the prearticular was narrow and curved, and the splenial was thin and triangular in outline. The external mandibular fenestra, an opening at the outer side of the mandible, was larger than that of Erlikosaurus because the surangular was shallow from top to bottom.

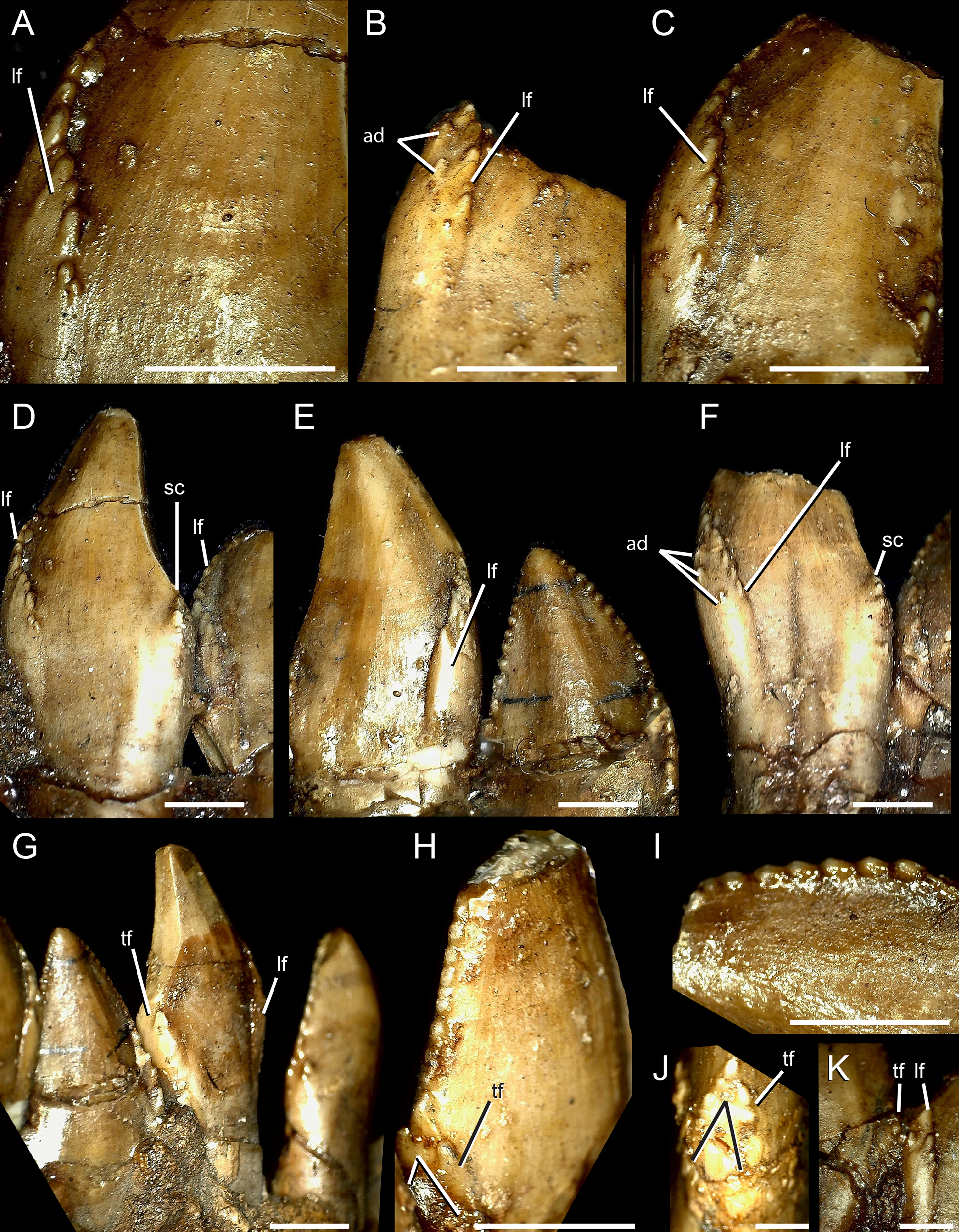
Frontmost dentary teeth, showing folded carinae (lf) and accessory denticles (ad)

Segnosaurus had the fewest teeth in the dentary; 24 in each half determined from the number of sockets, as well as the largest teeth known among therizinosaurs. The dentary teeth were foliodont (leaf-shaped) and bore enlarged, relatively tall, sideways compressed crowns with a slight recurvature at the upper margin of the tips. By comparison, the teeth of Erlikosaurus were smaller, symmetrical, and simpler. The bases of the crowns increased slightly in size hindwards across the tooth row, which reflected a decrease in sideways compression. The front surfaces of the crowns and outward-facing sides were convex while the inward-facing sides were concave. A thickened ridge ran along the longitude of the inward-facing side near the upper half of the crown, which was flanked by weak grooves near the front and back edges of the teeth, reaching almost to the cervix (neck; the transition between the crown and root) of the teeth. In general, the 18 front-most teeth were relatively homodont (of the same type), though the crown of the second tooth was relatively shorter and more tapered; this may also have been true for the first tooth, but it was not preserved. The teeth further back in the row also decreased in relative height hindwards. By comparison, the front four to five dentary teeth of Erlikosaurus were conidont (cone-shaped) with a gradual transition to foliodont teeth.

The dentary teeth were tightly packed, but not pressed closely together, with the tooth crowns approaching each other at mid-length. The denticles (serrations) were large and bulbous, diminishing slightly in size towards the tooth tips, with about 5–6 denticles per 3 mm (0.12 in). The front carinae (cutting edges) folded upwards to overlap the inner surface of the crowns on the third to eighteenth teeth, but such folds were absent on the second and probably first crowns. The denticles were roughly perpendicular with the tip of the tooth crowns but parallel to the crown height on the front side fold and triangular facet on the hind side. There was a series of accessory denticles (in addition to those on the carinae) that projected from the front surfaces of the carinal folds, which made the front edges of the crowns more broadly roughened. The carinae of the hind edges were also very modified, and bifurcated (split in two) near the cervix, where they formed a flattened triangular, raised facet, which projected from the tooth crown and contacted or approached the folded carinae on the front edge of the crowns behind them (this arrangement is present in teeth 2–12). Such split carinae are known from other tetanuran theropods, where they are considered abnormalities caused by trauma, aberrant tooth replacement, or genetic factors. Though the condition in Segnosaurus was similar, it was uniformly expressed across the teeth of both dentaries, and does not appear to have been an abnormality, but served to roughen the contacts between tooth bases.

The 22nd and 23rd dentary teeth of Segnosaurus were significantly smaller than the rest, almost conidont, and had an additional third carina with denticles on their inner sides. Most of the other hindmost tooth crowns are damaged so their complete features are unknown. The additional carina on tooth 23 appears to have been fully denticulated while the denticles were restricted to the basal side of the crown in tooth 22. Segnosaurus was unique among all known theropods in possessing triple carinae. The 14th alveolus on the right dentary of the holotype is walled over by seemingly pathological (due to injury or disease) bone growth but the teeth in that part of the dentary are damaged so it is not possible to determine how the teeth were affected by this. The teeth in the same area of the left dentary bear triple carinae, though this dentary has no external indications of pathology that could have led to this condition, thus it cannot be concluded nor ruled out that this feature is the result of a pathology. Segnosaurus replaced its teeth in waves running from back to front of the jaws, that encompassed two to three erupting crowns. Some of the fully erupted teeth have wear on the carinae of their hind sides, unlike what is seen in other therizinosaurs. The texture of the enamel appears to have been broadly irregular and the roots of the teeth were almost circular.

=== Postcranial skeleton ===
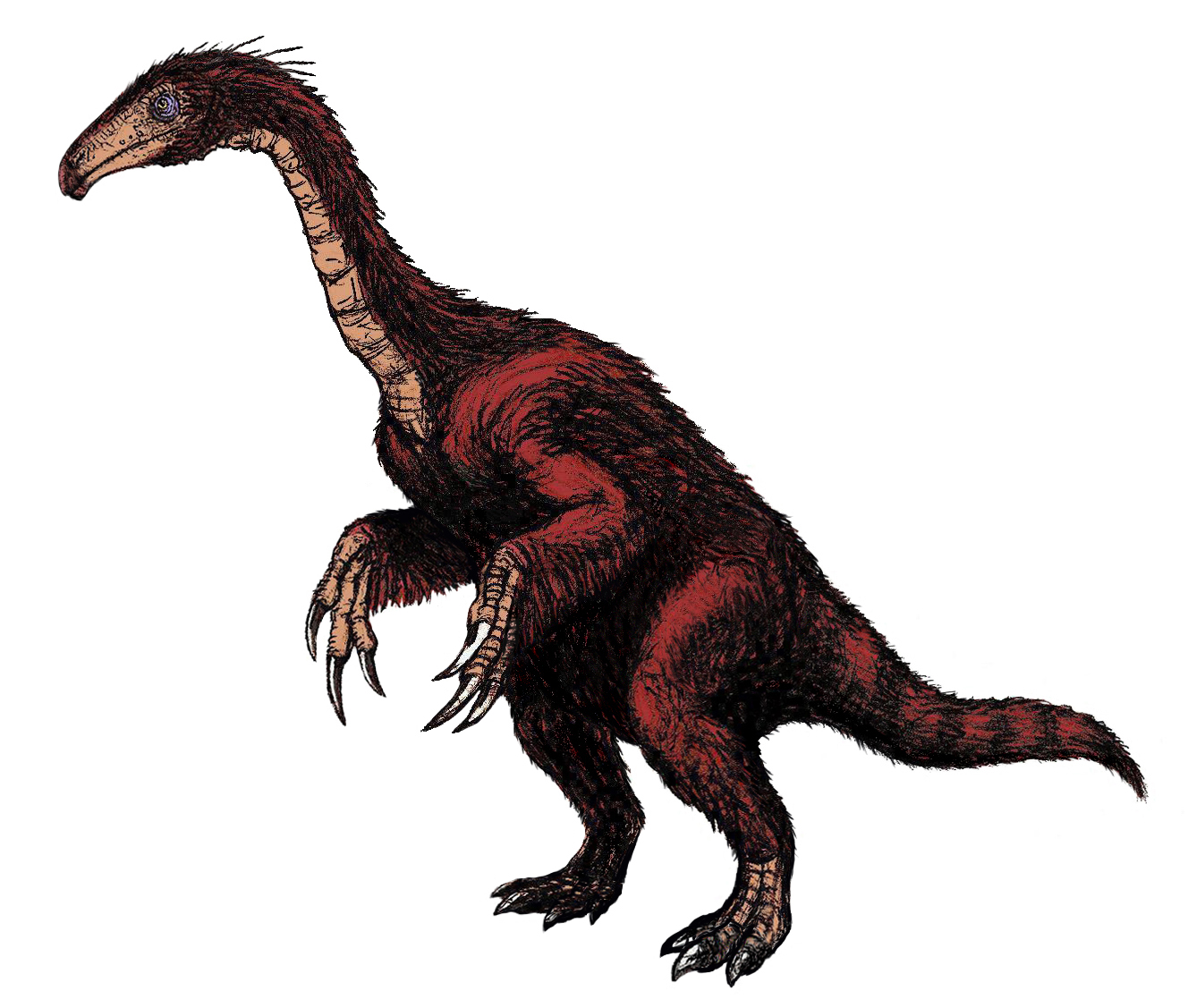
Life restoration

The scapula (shoulder blade) of Segnosaurus was straight and flat at the upper end, and was fused to the coracoid bone, forming the scapulocoracoid. The coracoid was very wide, rectangular in outline and thick at the middle. The massive humerus was 560 mm (22 in) in length; it had an almost-cylindrical shaft and well-defined condyles for articulation with the radius and ulna of the lower arm. The deltopectoral crest, where the deltoid muscle was attached to the upper front of the humerus, was well-developed. The humerus was distinct from those of other therizinosaurs, being straight rather than sigmoid shaped and not expanded or deflected forwards at its upper end. The humerus was also not expanded at the middle, and the entepicondyle was not well-developed. The lack of these features was more similar to ornithomimosaurs and troodontids than to other therizinosaurs. The radius was also massive—about 60 percent of the humerus—with a straight shaft. The ulna was thicker than the radius and slightly longer—about 70 percent of the humerus—and slightly twisted along its middle axis. The hand was tridactyl (three-fingered). The phalanx bones of the fingers were flattened from top to bottom and the articular depressions on their sides were not very developed. The first phalanx of the first finger was long and thin while the first and second phalanxes of the second finger were short. The ungual of the third finger was somewhat longer than the second phalanx and quite flat from top to bottom, which may have been a unique feature of Segnosaurus. This ungual was sharpy curved, very pointed, and compressed from side to side. The lower tubercle, where the flexor tendons attached to the ungual, was thick and robust.

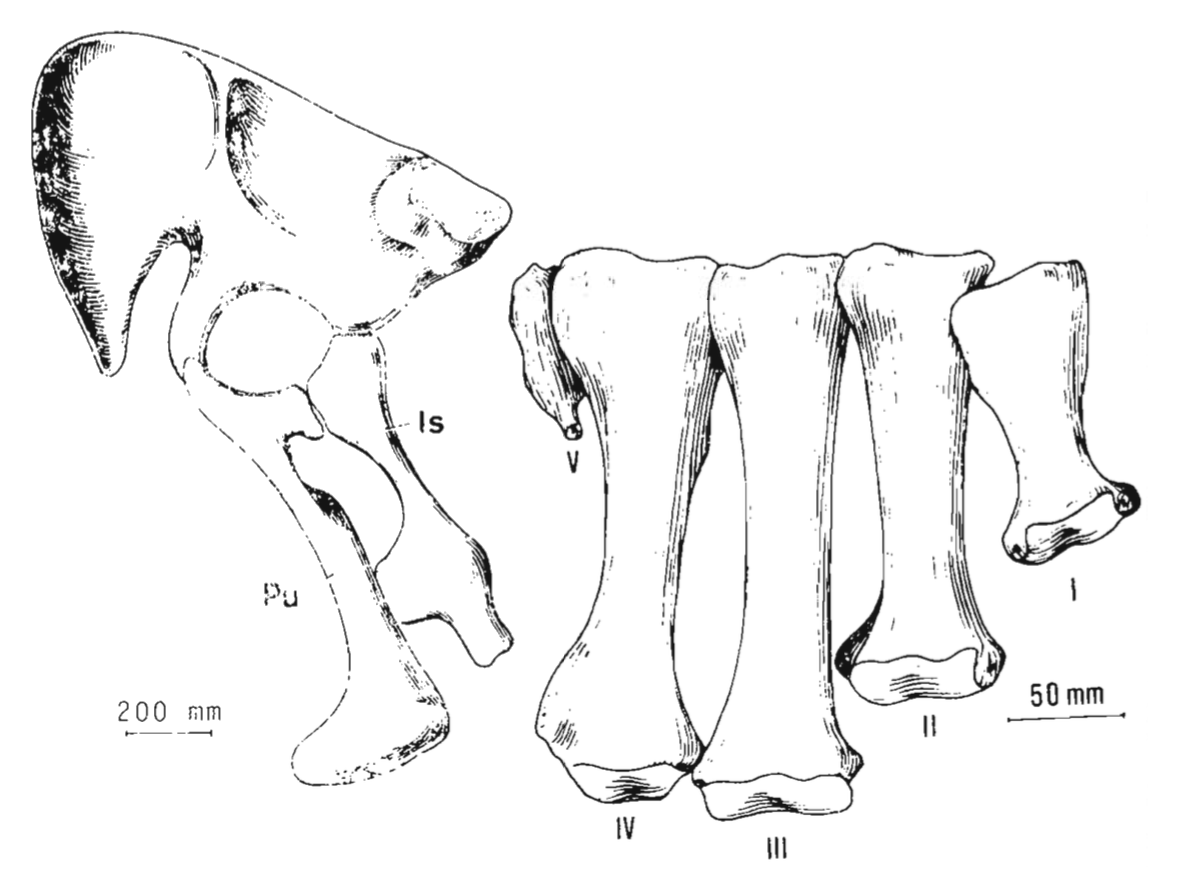
Reconstructed holotype pelvis in left side view and metatarsus in top view

The pelvis of Segnosaurus was robust and had sharply sideways-directed lobes at the front. The pelvis was shortened at the front, a feature found among bird-like theropods but uncommon among theropods as a whole. The pubic bone was directed backwards and down in parallel with the ischium; this backwards orientation of the pubic bone is known as the opisthopubic condition. This feature is only known from birds and their closest coelurosaurian relatives while other theropod dinosaurs had forwards-directed pubic bones. The pubic bone was elongated, flattened sideways, and had an ellipsoid projection or "boot" at the front of its lower end. The pelvis was distinct from those of other therizinosaurs in that the upper margin of the ilium had a pronounced overhang on the lower side and that the hindwards projecting process of the ischium was extensive, almost 50 percent of the front-to-back length of the obturator process. Some features of the pelvis were similar to that of Nothronychus, particularly the ischia, but it is uncertain whether these similarities were due to them having a common ancestor to the exclusion of other derived therizinosaurids, or because they retained basal features since lost in other relatives. The ischium of Segnosaurus was distinct from that of Nothronychus in that it had an almost-rectangular obturator process and an almost-circular obturator foramen. The pelvis was distinct from that of Enigmosaurus by its deep obturator process not fusing with its counterpart at the middle, by its unfused pubic boot, and because the lower part of the pubic shaft was wide from front to back. Segnosaurus was distinct from both Nothronychus and Enigmosaurus in having a deep brevis fossa (a groove where the caudofemoralis brevis muscle of the tail originated) and because its pubic boot lacked a well developed hindwards projection.

The femur was straight with an oval cross-section and was 840 mm (33 in) in length. The head of the femur was placed on a long "neck" and the lower condyles were well-defined. The tibia was straight, slightly shorter than the femur, and twisted along its axis. The fibula was long and narrowed towards its lower end. The metatarsus of the foot was short, massive, and consisted of five bones—four of which functioned as support elements and terminated in four toes. Functionally tetradactyl (four-toed) feet were unique to derived therizinosaurs; basal therizinosaurs and all other theropods had tridactyl feet in which the first toe was short and did not reach the ground. Externally, the metatarsus was similar to, though proportionally larger than, those of prosauropods, an early evolutionary grade of sauropodomorphs. The epiphyses on the upper metatarsals were hypertrophied (enlarged), a distinctive feature of the genus. The first toe was shorter than the others but was of equal functional importance; the second and third toes were equally long while the fourth was thinnest. The toe ungual was robust, sharply curved, flat at the side, and more pointed than those of prosauropods. The lower tubercle where the flexor ligaments attached was robust. While the lack of strong compression of the toe unguals distinguished Segnosaurus from Erlikosaurus from the same formation, the lack of compression was common among therizinosaurs and therefore not unique to Segnosaurus. The cervical vertebrae were platycoelous and had large, massive centra (bodies) and low neural arches. The sacrum consisted of six, firmly fused vertebrae; the centra of these vertebrae were broadened and relatively elongated, and each centrum was slightly longer than their width. The neural spines here were not very long but surpassed the level of the ilia. The caudal (tail) vertebrae closest to the body were massive, high, and somewhat compressed from side to side. The neural arch was low with a small neural canal. The caudal vertebrae closer to the tip of the tail were platycoelous and had short, massive centra. The transverse processes of the caudal vertebrae and the ribs were robust and elongated.

== Classification ==
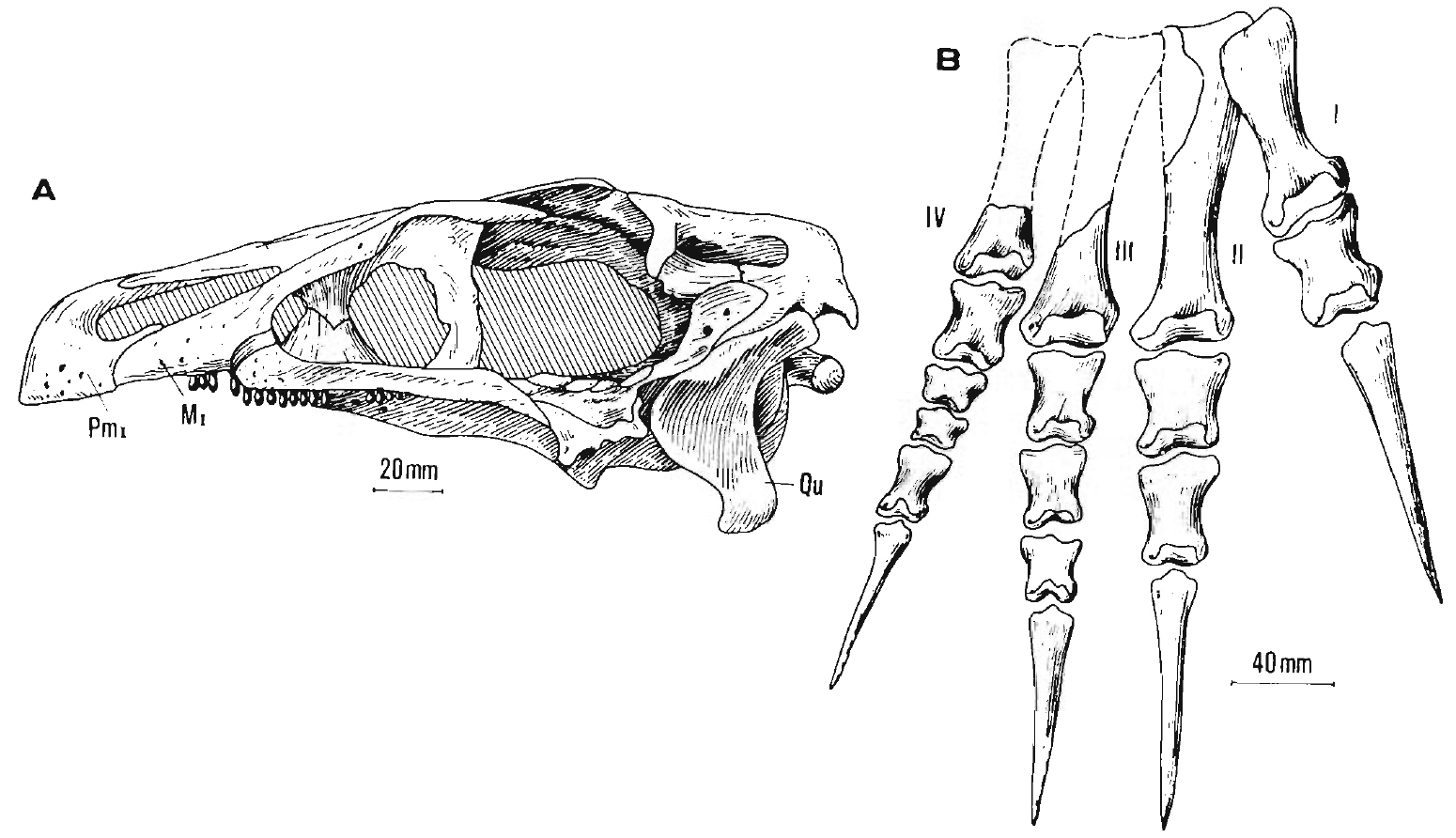
Skull and foot bones of Erlikosaurus, which together with Segnosaurus (both from Mongolia) became the basis of the new infraorder Segnosauria; this group is now a junior synonym of Therizinosauria.

Segnosaurus and its relatives, which are now recognized as therizinosaurs ("scythe reptiles"), were long considered an enigmatic group. Their mosaic of features resembling those of different dinosaur groups and the scarcity of their fossils led to controversy over their evolutionary relationships for decades after their initial discovery (the forelimb elements of Therizinosaurus itself were originally identified as belonging to a giant turtle when described in 1954). In 1979, Perle noted the Segnosaurus fossils were possibly representative of a new family of dinosaurs, which he named Segnosauridae, Segnosaurus being the type genus and sole member. He tentatively classified Segnosauridae as theropods, traditionally thought of as the "meat-eating" dinosaurs, pointing to similarities in the mandible and its front teeth. Using features of their humeri and hand claws, he distinguished Segnosauridae from the theropod families Deinocheiridae and Therizinosauridae, which were then only known from the genera Deinocheirus and Therizinosaurus, respectively, mainly represented by large forelimbs found in Mongolia. Later in 1979, Barsbold and Perle found the pelvic features of segnosaurids and dromaeosaurids were so different from those of "true" theropods that they should be separated into three taxa of the same rank, possibly at the level of infraorder within Saurischia, one of the two main divisions of dinosaurs—the other being Ornithischia.

In 1980, Barsbold and Perle named the new theropod infraorder Segnosauria, containing only Segnosauridae. In the same article, they named the new genus Erlikosaurus (known from a well-preserved skull and partial skeleton)—which they tentatively considered a segnosaurid—and reported a partial pelvis of an undetermined segnosaurian, both from the same formation as Segnosaurus. The specimens provided relatively complete data on this group; they were united by their opisthopubic pelvis, slender mandible, and the toothless front of their jaws. Barsbold and Perle stated that, though some of their features resembled those of ornithischians and sauropods, these similarities were superficial and distinct when examined in detail. While they were essentially different from other theropods—perhaps due to diverging from them relatively early—and warranted a new infraorder, they did show similarities with the theropods. Because the Erlikosaurus specimen lacked a pelvis, the authors were unsure that the undetermined segnosaurian could belong to the same genus, in which case they would consider it part of a separate family. Though Erlikosaurus was difficult to compare directly to Segnosaurus because its remains were incomplete, Perle stated in 1981 there was no justification for separating it into another family.

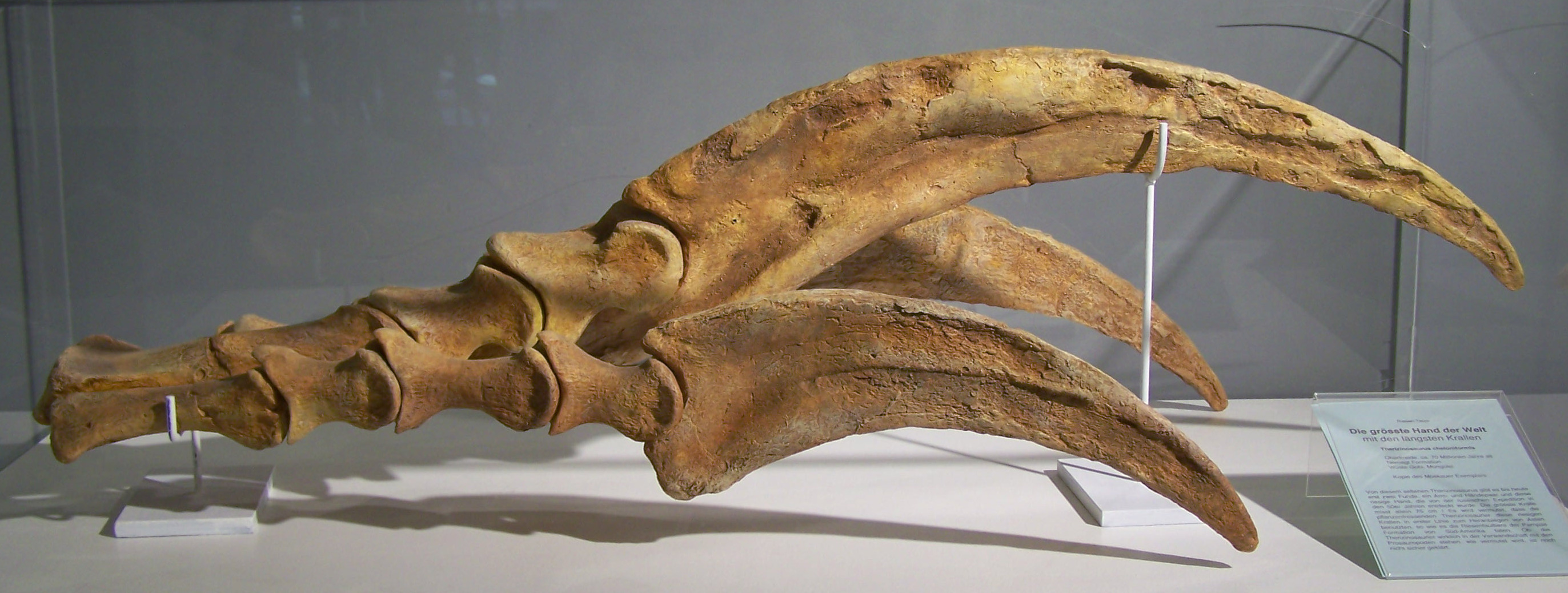
Therizinosaurus, the first known therizinosaur, was originally known only from forelimb bones from Mongolia (cast shown here, in Aathal Dinosaur Museum), which created confusion about its affinities with other theropods.

In 1982, Perle reported the discovery of hindlimb fragments similar to those of Segnosaurus and assigned them to Therizinosaurus, whose forelimbs had been found in almost the same location. He concluded that the Therizinosauridae, Deinocheiridae, and Segnosauridae, which all had enlarged forelimbs, represented the same taxonomic group. Segnosaurus and Therizinosaurus were particularly similar, leading Perle to suggest they belonged in a family to the exclusion of Deinocheiridae (today, Deinocheirus is recognized as an ornithomimosaur). Barsbold retained Segnosaurus and Erlikosaurus in the family Segnosauridae in 1983 and named the new genus Enigmosaurus based on the previously undetermined segnosaurian pelvis. The structure of the pelvis of Erlikosaurus was unknown but Barsbold considered it unlikely the Enigmosaurus pelvis belonged to it because Erlikosaurus and Segnosaurus were so similar in other respects while the pelvis of Enigmosaurus was very different from that of Segnosaurus. Barsbold found that segnosaurids were so peculiar compared to more typical theropods that they were either a very significant deviation in theropod evolution, or were possibly outside the group; he nevertheless retained them within Theropoda. Later in 1983, Barsbold stated the segnosaurian pelvis deviated significantly from the theropod norm and found the configuration of their ilia generally similar to those of sauropods.

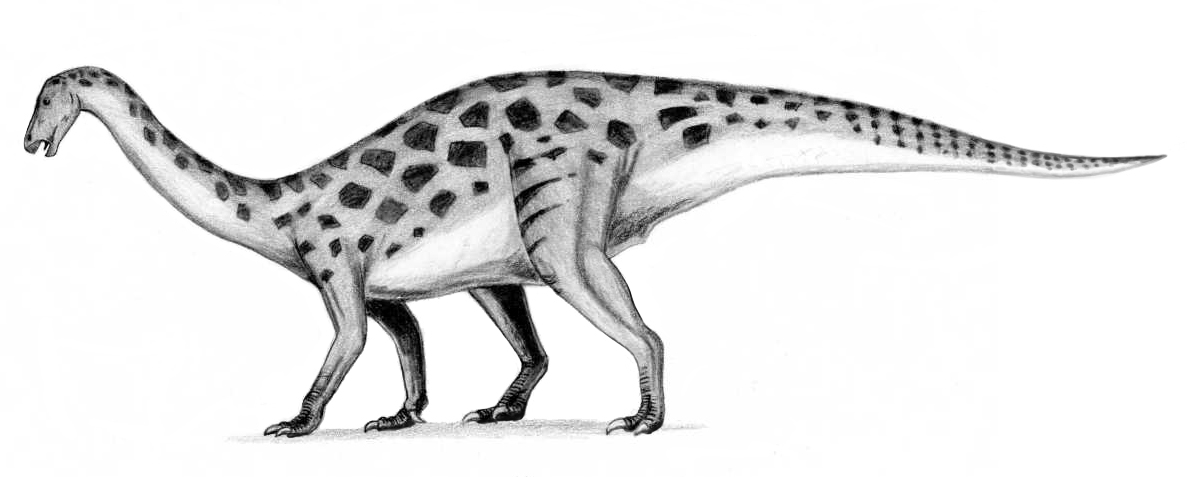
Outdated restoration of a prosauropod-like, quadrupedal Erlikosaurus. "Segnosaurs" were often depicted this way until they were definitively identified as theropods.

Gregory S. Paul concluded in 1984 that segnosaurs had no theropodan features but were derived, late-surviving Cretaceous prosauropods with adaptations similar to those of ornithischians. He found segnosaurs to be similar to prosauropods in the morphology of their snout, mandible, and hindfoot; to ornithischians in their cheek, palate, pubis, and ankle; and to early dinosaurs in other respects. He proposed that ornithischians were descended from prosauropods and that the segnosaurs were an intermediate relic of this transition, which supposedly took place during the Triassic period. In this way, he considered segnosaurians to have a comparable position to herbivorous dinosaurs in general, as monotremes have to mammals. He found it unlikely but did not rule out that segnosaurs could have derived from theropods or that segnosaurs, prosauropods and ornithischians were each independently derived from early dinosaurs. David B. Norman considered Paul's idea contentious and "bound to provoke much argument" in 1985. In 1988, Paul maintained that segnosaurs were late-surviving, ornithischian-like prosauropods and proposed a segnosaurian identity for Therizinosaurus. He also placed segnosauria within Phytodinosauria, a superorder that Robert Bakker had created in 1985 to contain all plant-eating dinosaurs. In a 1986 study of the inter-relationships of saurischian dinosaurs, Jacques Gauthier concluded segnosaurs were prosauropods. While he conceded they had similarities with ornithischians and theropods, he proposed these features had evolved independently. In a 1989 conference abstract about sauropodomorph inter-relationships, Paul Sereno also considered segnosaurs to be prosauropods, based on skull features.

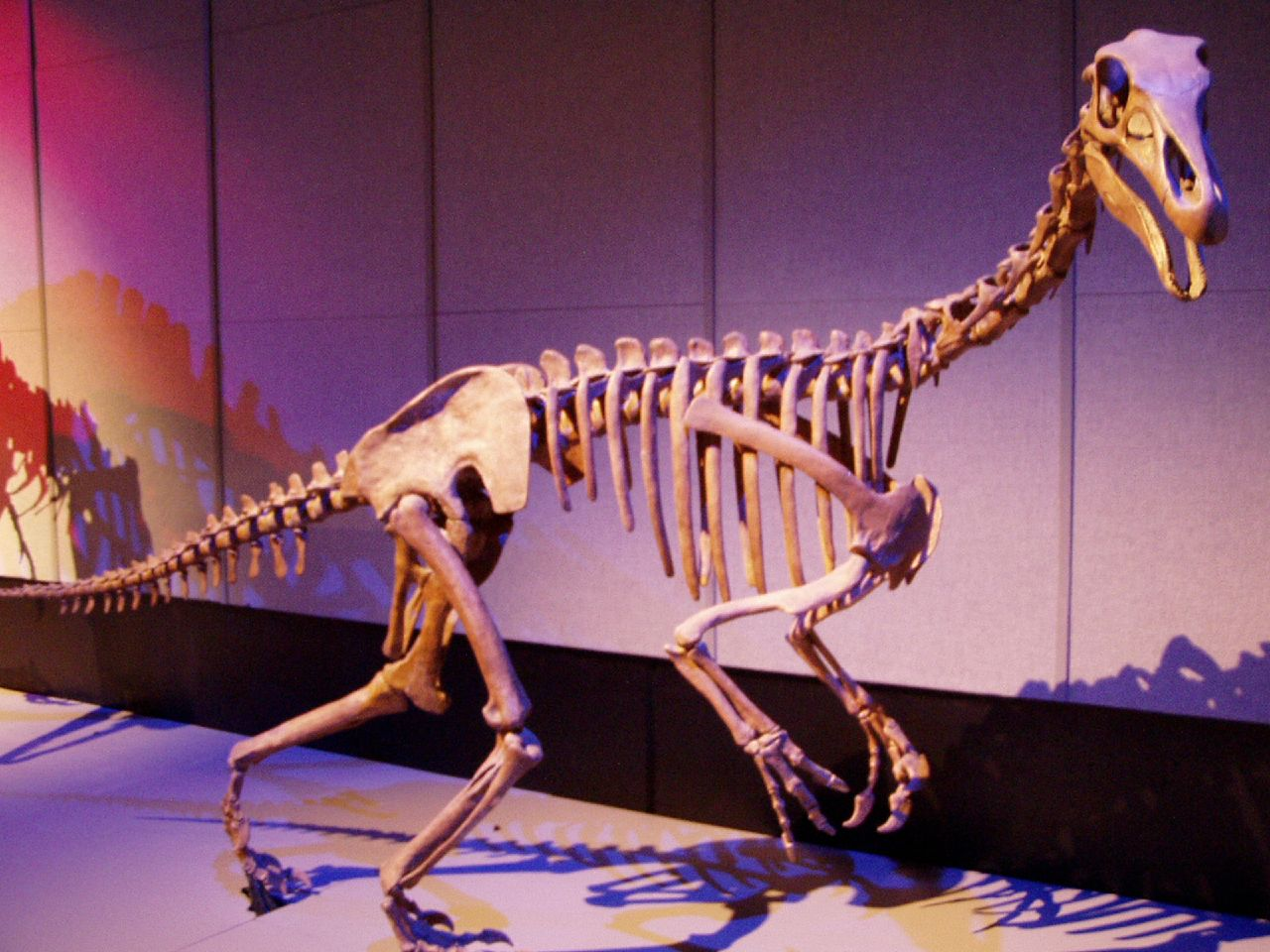
Reconstructed skeleton of Alxasaurus from China in Royal Tyrrell Museum, the completeness of which confirmed therizinosaurs as theropods

In a 1990 review article, Barsbold and Teresa Maryańska found Segnosauria to be a rare and aberrant group of saurischians in an unresolved position among sauropodomorphs and theropods, and probably closer to the former. Accordingly, they listed them as Saurischia sedis mutabilis (position subject to change). They agreed the hindlimbs assigned to Therizinosaurus in 1982 were segnosaurian but did not consider this a sufficient justification for Therizinosaurus itself being a segnosaur because it was only known from forelimbs. In 1993, Dale A. Russell and Dong Zhi-Ming described the new genus Alxasaurus from China; at the time this was the most complete large theropod from its time and place. While Alxasaurus was similar in some respects to prosauropods, the detailed morphology of its limbs linked it to Therizinosaurus and segnosaurs. Because its fore and hindlimbs were preserved, Alxasaurus showed that Perle's assignment of segnosaurian hindlimbs to Therizinosaurus was probably correct. Russell and Dong, therefore, proposed that Segnosauridae was a junior synonym of the older name Therizinosauridae, and that Alxasaurus was the most completely known representative so far. They also named the new higher taxonomic rank Therizinosauroidea to contain Alxasaurus and Therizinosauridae because the new genus was somewhat different from its relatives. They concluded that therizinosaurs were tetanuran theropods, most closely related to ornithomimids, troodontids, and oviraptorids, which they placed together in the group Oviraptorosauria (because they found Maniraptora—the conventional grouping of these—invalid, and the higher-level taxonomy of theropods was in flux).

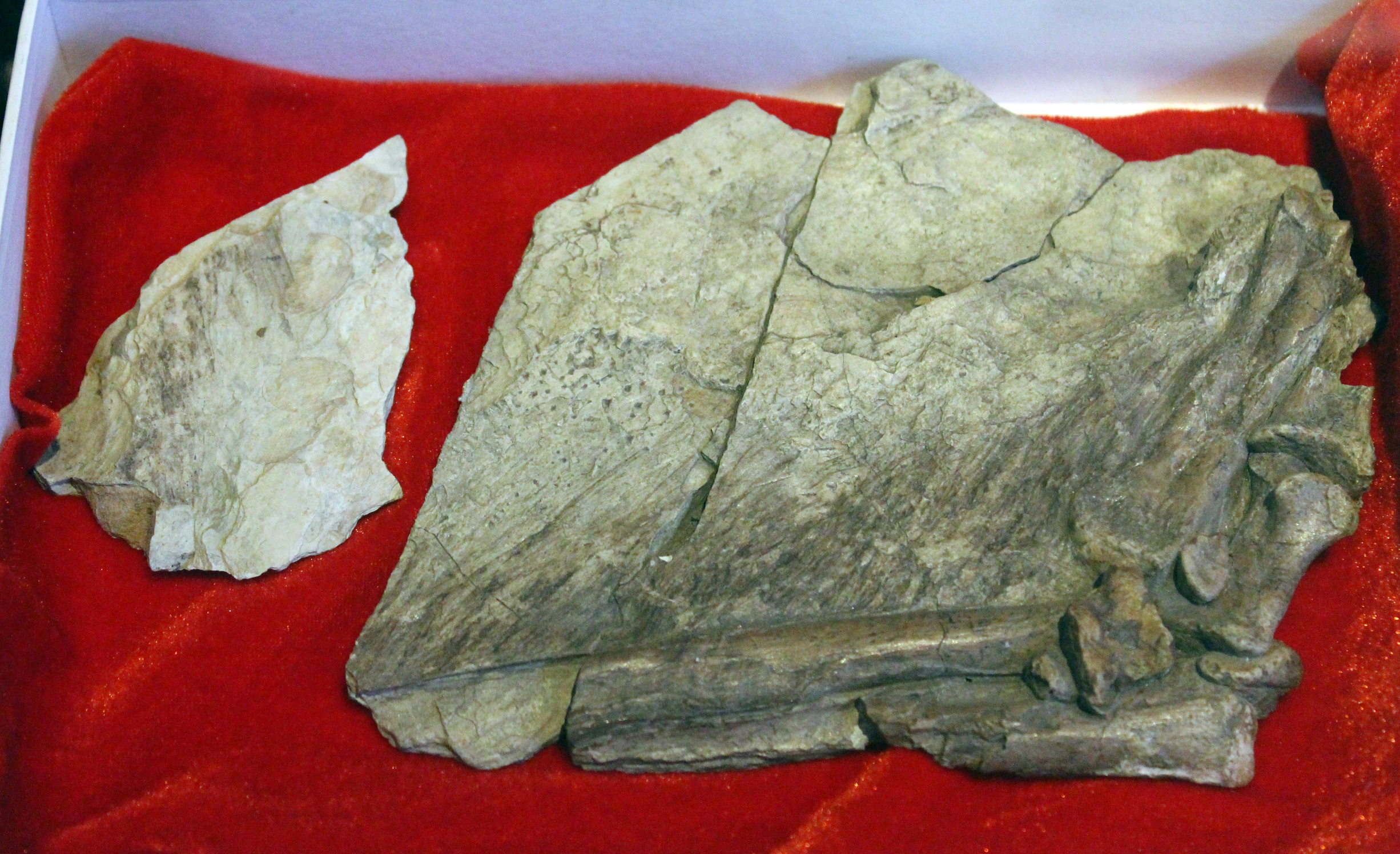
Partial forelimb of the basal therizinosaur Beipiaosaurus with impressions of feather-like structures, Paleozoological Museum of China

Perle and his co-authors of a 1994 redescription of Erlikosaurus's skull accepted the synonymy of Segnosauridae with Therizinosauridae and they considered therizinosaurs to have been maniraptoran theropods, the group that also includes modern birds (because they did find Maniraptora to be valid through their analysis). They also discussed the alternative previous hypotheses for therizinosaur affinities and demonstrated faults with them. In 1995, Lev A. Nessov rejected the idea therizinosaurs were theropods; he considered them a distinct group within Saurischia. In 1996, Thomas R. Holtz Jr. found therizinosaurs to group with oviraptorosaurs in a phylogenetic analysis of coelurosaurian theropods. Russell coined the name Therizinosauria for the wider group in 1997. In 1999, Xing Xu and colleagues described Beipiaosaurus, a small, basal therizinosaur from China, which confirmed the group belonged among the coelurosaurian theropods, and that similarities with prosauropods had evolved independently. They published the first cladogram showing the evolutionary relationships of Therizinosauria and demonstrated Beipiaosaurus retained features of more basal theropods and coelurosaurs, which linked them with therizinosaurs. The preservation of feather-like structures in Beipiaosaurus also suggested this feature was more widely distributed among theropods than previously thought.

By the early 21st century, many more therizinosaur taxa had been discovered—including some outside Asia—the first being Nothronychus from North America in 2001. Basal taxa that helped illuminate the early evolution of the group, such as Falcarius in 2005, had also been discovered. Therizinosaurs were no longer considered as rare or aberrant but more diverse in features—including size—than previously thought and their classification as maniraptoran theropods was generally accepted. The placement of Therizinosauria within Maniraptora continued to be unclear; in 2017, Alan H. Turner and colleagues found them to group with oviraptorosaurs while in 2009 Zanno and colleagues found them to be the most basal clade within Maniraptora, bracketed by Ornithomimosauria and Alvarezsauridae. Despite the additional fossil material, the interrelations within the group were also still uncertain by 2010, when Zanno conducted the most detailed phylogenetic analysis of the Therizinosauria to that point. She cited the inaccessibility, damage, potential loss of holotype specimens, scarcity of cranial remains, and fragmentary specimens with few overlapping elements as the most significant obstacles to resolving the evolutionary relationships within the group. The position of Segnosaurus and those of some other Asian therizinosaurids was affected by these factors; Zanno stated more well-preserved specimens and the rediscovery of missing elements would be necessary. Zanno also revised Therizinosauroidea to exclude Falcarius and retained it in the wider clade Therizinosauria, which became the senior synonym of Segnosauria. By 2015, Segnosaurus remained one of the best known therizinosaurs, according to Christophe Hendrickx and colleagues.

The following cladogram shows the relationships within Therizinosauria according to a 2013 study by Hanyong Pu and colleagues, which was based on Zanno's 2010 analysis, with the addition of the basal genus Jianchangosaurus:

- Therizinosauria
  - Falcarius
  - unnamed
    - Jianchangosaurus
    - Therizinosauroidea
      - Beipiaosaurus
      - unnamed
        - Alxasaurus
        - Therizinosauridae
          - Erliansaurus
          - Nanshiungosaurus
          - Neimongosaurus
          - - Segnosaurus
            - Erlikosaurus
            - Suzhousaurus
            - Enigmosaurus
            - Therizinosaurus
            - Nothronychus

=== Paleobiogeography ===
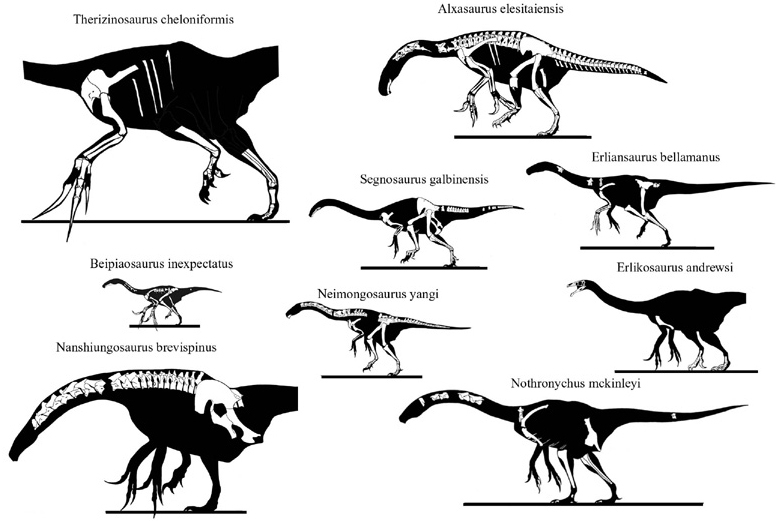
Known elements of various therizinosaurs shown to scale, with Segnosaurus in the upper middle

The basalmost definite therizinosaur is Falcarius from the Early Cretaceous of North America; it showed the pelvis and dentition were the first features that were modified away from the more general maniraptoran plan in therizinosaurs, probably reflecting their transition from carnivory to herbivory. Therizinosaurs are mainly known from the Cretaceous of Asia and North America, and possible remains from other ages and places are controversial. Since therizinosaurs are known to have lived across the supercontinent Laurasia (which consisted of what are now North America, Europe, and Asia), Zanno suggested two scenarios for their paleobiogeographic distribution in 2010. One possibility is they dispersed through vicariance, whereby therizinosaurs were present in the areas that became Asia and North America before the rifting that divided these areas in the Late Triassic. The other possibility is that basal therizinosaurs dispersed between Asia and North America via Europe after the rifting event but before the middle Barremian; between 132 and 138 million years ago, a temporary land bridge connected North America and Europe, whereafter the landmasses were again isolated from each other, explaining why the basal therizinosaurs Beipiaosaurus from Asia and Falcarius from North America were so morphologically divergent from each other, though coeval. The presence of the derived therizinosaurid Nothronychus, which was most-closely related to Asian genera, in North America during the Turonian stage of the early Late Cretaceous also shows there would have been a faunal interchange between North America and Asia via a late-Early Cretaceous land bridge before that (during the Aptian/Albian), which is also seen in some other dinosaur groups.

== Paleobiology ==
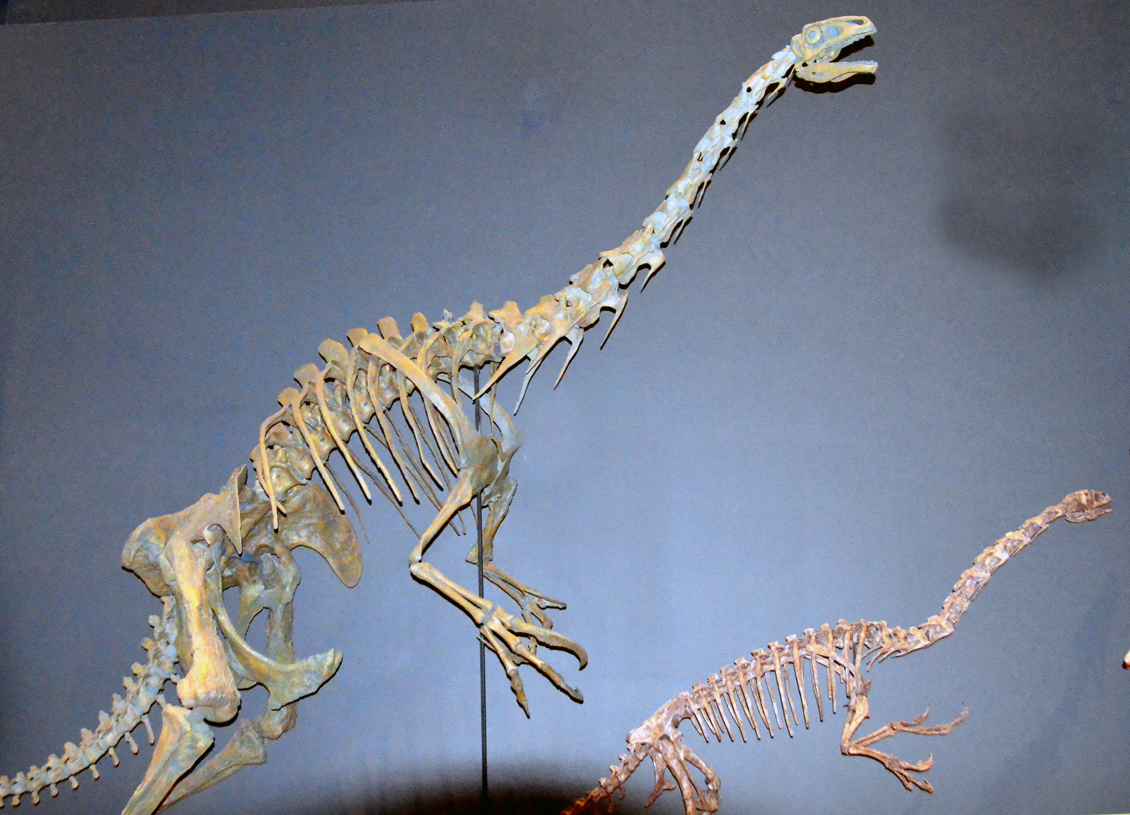
Reconstructed skeletons of the North American therizinosaurs Nothronychus (large) and Falcarius, in modern, bipedal postures, Natural History Museum of Utah

In 1979 and 1981, Barsbold and Perle said the short, massive metatarsus and unusually large, splayed toes indicated that Segnosaurus and its relatives were not adapted for rapid locomotion, perhaps because it was not required by their lifestyle; Barsbold and Perle suggested they could have been amphibious. Barsbold and Maryańska agreed in 1990 the short, broad feet and bulky trunks of the group indicated they were slow-moving animals. Paul depicted a prosauropod-like "segnosaur" skeleton (a composite of various genera) in a quadrupedal posture in 1988. Based on the more complete remains of Alxasaurus and the articulation of its vertebral column, Russell concluded in 1993 that Paul's skeletal restoration was inaccurate and that the arms of therizinosaurs were held clear off the ground. In 1995, Nessov suggested the elongated claws of therizinosaurs were used for defense against predators and that their young could have used their claws for arboreal locomotion along trunks and in tree crowns in a similar manner to sloths.

In a 2012 study of the endocranial anatomy of Erlikosaurus and other therizinosaurs that preserve braincases, Stephan Lautenschlager and colleagues found these dinosaurs had well-developed senses of smell, hearing, and balance. The former two senses may have played a role in foraging, predator evasion, and social behavior. These senses were also well-developed in earlier coelurosaurs, so therizinosaurs may have inherited these traits from their carnivorous ancestors and used them for different dietary purposes. In a 2014 study of the function of therizinosaur hand claws, Lautenschlager found that these would not have been used for digging, which would have been done with the foot claws because, since as in other maniraptorans, feathers on the forelimbs would have interfered with this function. He could neither confirm nor disregard that the hand claws could have been used for defense, combat, stabilization by grasping tree trunks during high browsing, sexual display, or gripping mates during copulation. He largely ruled out that they dug burrows, due to their size.

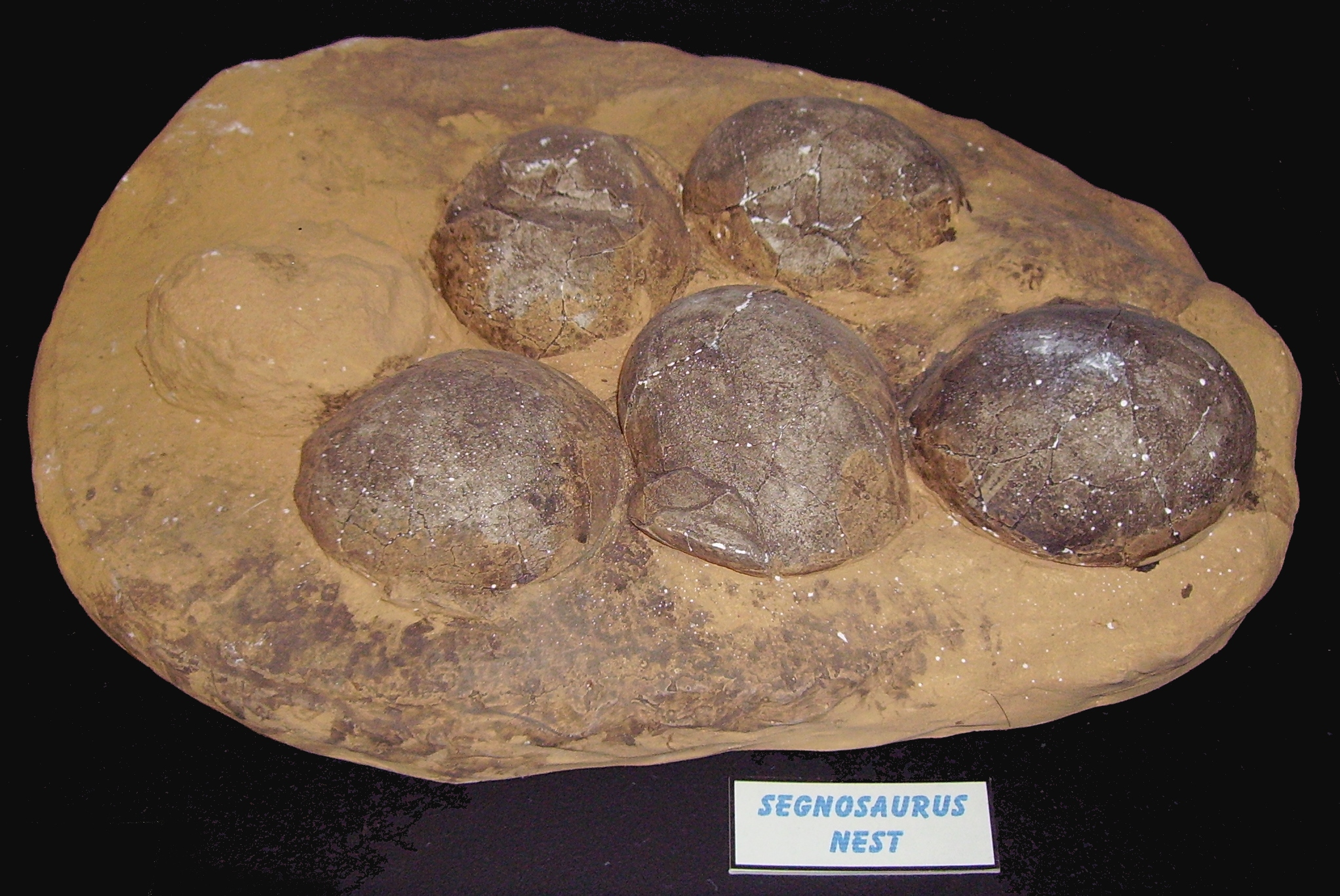
Nest attributed to therizinosaurs, Dinosaurland Fossil Museum

Dinosaur eggs with embryos of the Dendroolithidae type from the Nanchao Formation of China were identified as belonging to therizinosaurs and described by Martin Kundrát and colleagues in 2007. The development of the embryos and the fact that no adults were found in association with the nests indicate that therizinosaur hatchlings were precocial (capable of locomotion from birth) and able to leave their nests to feed alone, independently of their parents. In a 2013 conference abstract, Yoshitsugu Kobayashi and colleagues reported a nesting ground of theropod dinosaurs from the Javkhlant Formation of Mongolia that contained at least 17 egg clutches within an area 22 by 52 meters (72 ft × 171 ft). Each clutch contained eight spherical eggs with rough surfaces; the eggs were in contact with each other and arranged in a circular structure with no central opening. The researchers identified the eggs as dendroolithid, and therefore therizinosaurian. Though therizinosaurs are not known from the formation, it overlies the Bayan Shireh Formation where Segnosaurus, Erlikosaurus, and Enigmosaurus were found. The multiple clutches indicate some therizinosaurs were colonial nesters like hadrosaurs, prosauropods, titanosaurs, and birds. The eggs were found in a single stratigraphic layer, suggesting the dinosaurs nested at the site on a single occasion and did not exhibit site fidelity (always returning to the same site to breed).

=== Diet and feeding ===
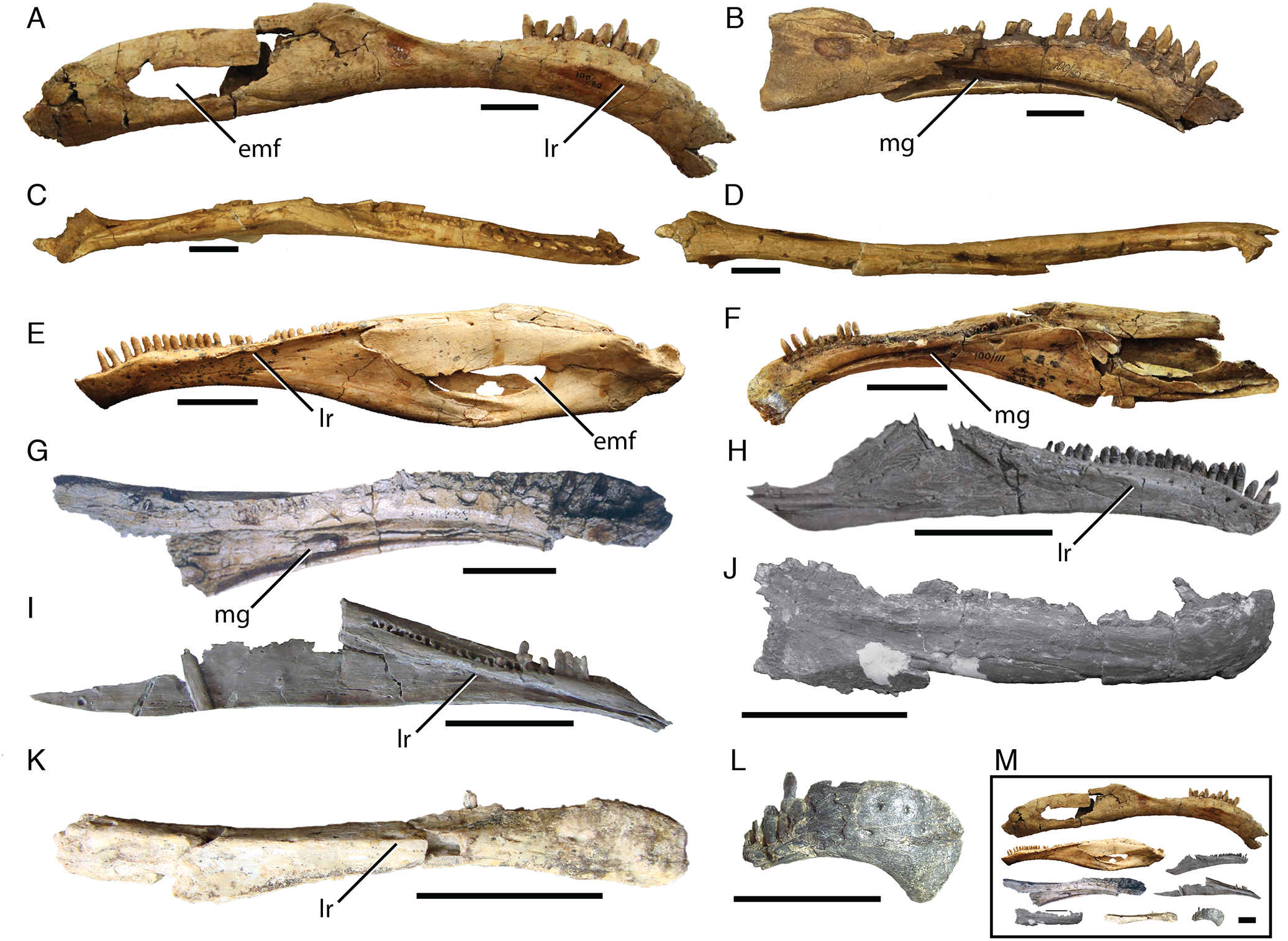
Right half of the holotype mandible shown from the inner side (A), the top (C), and bottom (D), and the left half shown from the inner side (B), compared with the mandibles of other therizinosaurs (to scale in lower right)

The unusual features of therizinosaurs have led to several interpretations of their feeding behavior; there is no direct evidence of their diet, such as stomach contents and feeding traces. In 1970, Anatoly K. Rozhdestvensky suggested Therizinosaurus—the only member of the group known at the time—used its large claws to open termite mounds or gather fruits from trees. Barsbold and Perle pointed out in 1979 and 1980 that their peculiar features probably reflected a different evolutionary direction than those of more typical theropods, many of which were considered effective, active predators. Their delicate jaws, small, weak teeth and beaks, and short, compact feet indicated they would not have used the armaments of other theropods to procure food but could have preyed on fish. In 1983, Barsbold said the horny beak at the front of the jaws and weakened teeth at the back were common features among herbivorous dinosaurs but not of carnivorous theropods, and speculated this might indicate segnosaurs had shifted to herbivory. In 1984, Paul suggested they were herbivorous due to the similarities of their skulls to those of prosauropod and ornithischian dinosaurs, which include horny beaks, inset rows of teeth, and a shelf at the side of the jaws that indicated the presence of cheeks. Like ornithischians, they could, therefore, crop, manipulate, and chew plants in a sophisticated manner. He also suggested the ilia of the pelvis had sideways-flaring blades at the front similar to those of sauropods to support a large gut that was used to ferment and process food. Norman stated in 1985 the possibility Segnosaurus was an aquatic fish-eater could explain its small, pointed teeth and broad and perhaps webbed feet, but found it mysterious why it should have a horny beak.

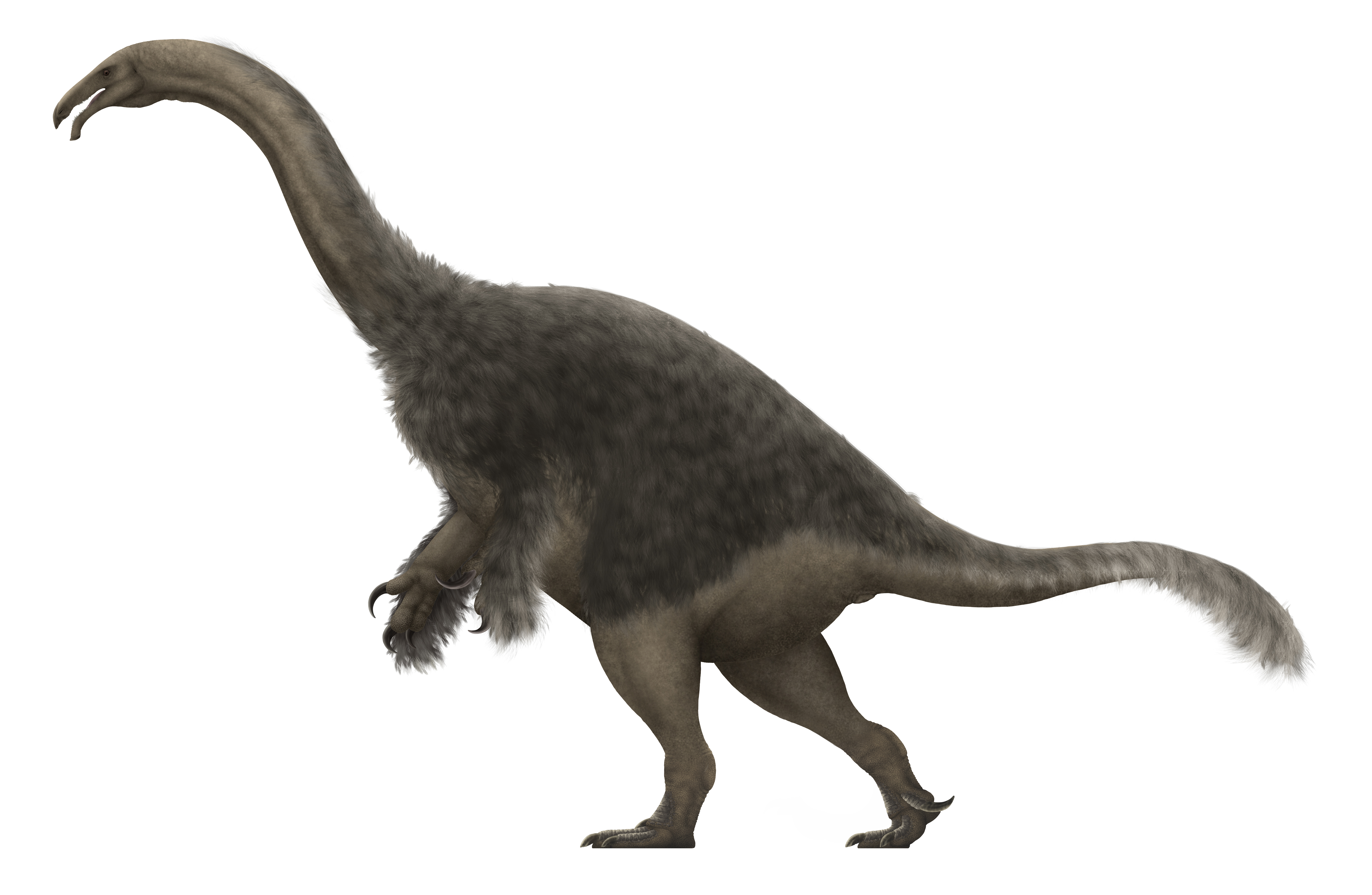
Restoration showing large area behind the legs caused by the backwards directed pubic bone; therizinosaurs may have "sat" on their pelvises during feeding

In 1993, Russell and Dong considered the small size of the head, blunt beaks and large body weights of therizinosaurs consistent with herbivory. In 1993 and 1997, Russell suggested therizinosaurs would have "sat" on their pelvises and supported their bodies on their hind limbs while using their long arms, claws, and flexible necks to reach leaves from trees and bushes with their beaks. They could have reached even higher while standing and browsing bipedally. This parallels the way some herbivorous mammals use their forelimbs to manipulate vegetation; Russell considered the extinct chalicotheres and ground sloths, as well as gorillas, adaptively convergent with therizinosaurs. Because therizinosaur remains are often found in sediments deposited in river and lake environments, Russell said they may have browsed on riparian bushes and trees. Based on the assemblage of fossils in the Bissekty Formation of Uzbekistan, Nessov suggested in 1995 that therizinosaurs could have been part of its nutrient-rich aquatic ecosystems, though perhaps indirectly, by feeding on wasps which had themselves fed on carrion of aquatic vertebrates. He found this consistent with Rozhdestvensky's suggestion that therizinosaurs may have fed on social insects. In a 2006 conference abstract, Sara Burch presented the inferred range of motion in the arms of the therizinosaur Neimongosaurus and concluded the overall motion at the glenoid-humeral joint at the shoulder was roughly circular, and directed sideways and slightly downwards, which diverged from the more oval, backwards-and-downwards-directed ranges of other theropods. This ability to extend their arms considerably forwards may have helped therizinosars reach and grasp for foliage.

In 2009, Zanno and colleagues stated therizinosaurs were the most-widely regarded candidates for herbivory among theropods and listed features associated with this diet. These included small, densely packed, coarse serrations; lanceolate (lance-shaped) teeth with a low replacement rate; a beak at the front of the jaws; an inset tooth row that suggests fleshy cheeks; an elongated neck; a small skull; a very large gut capacity as indicated by the rib circumference at the trunk and the outwards flaring processes of the ilia; and the loss of cursorial (related to running) adaptations in the hind limbs, including development of functionally tetradactyl feet. Zanno and colleagues found the clades at the base of Maniraptora—Ornithomimosauria, Therizinosauria, and Oviraptorosauria—had either direct or morphological evidence for herbivory, which would mean either this diet evolved independently multiple times in coelurosaurian theropods or that the primitive condition of the group was at least facultative herbivory with carnivory only emerging in more derived maniraptorans. Zanno and Peter J. Makovicky found, in 2011, therizinosaurs and some other groups of herbivorous dinosaurs that had beaks and retained teeth were unable to lose their teeth completely because they lacked gastric mills (gizzards) and needed the teeth to process food, and that the high-fiber folivorous (leaf-based) diet of therizinosaurs and other archosaurs may also have precluded the evolution of a complete beak. Lautenschlager found in 2014 the hands of therizinosaurs would have had to be able to extend the range of the animal to a point that could not be reached by the head if they were used for browsing and pulling down vegetation. In genera where both neck and forelimb elements are preserved, however, the necks were equal in length or longer than the forelimbs, so pulling vegetation would only make sense if lower parts of long branches were pulled down to access out-of-reach parts of trees.

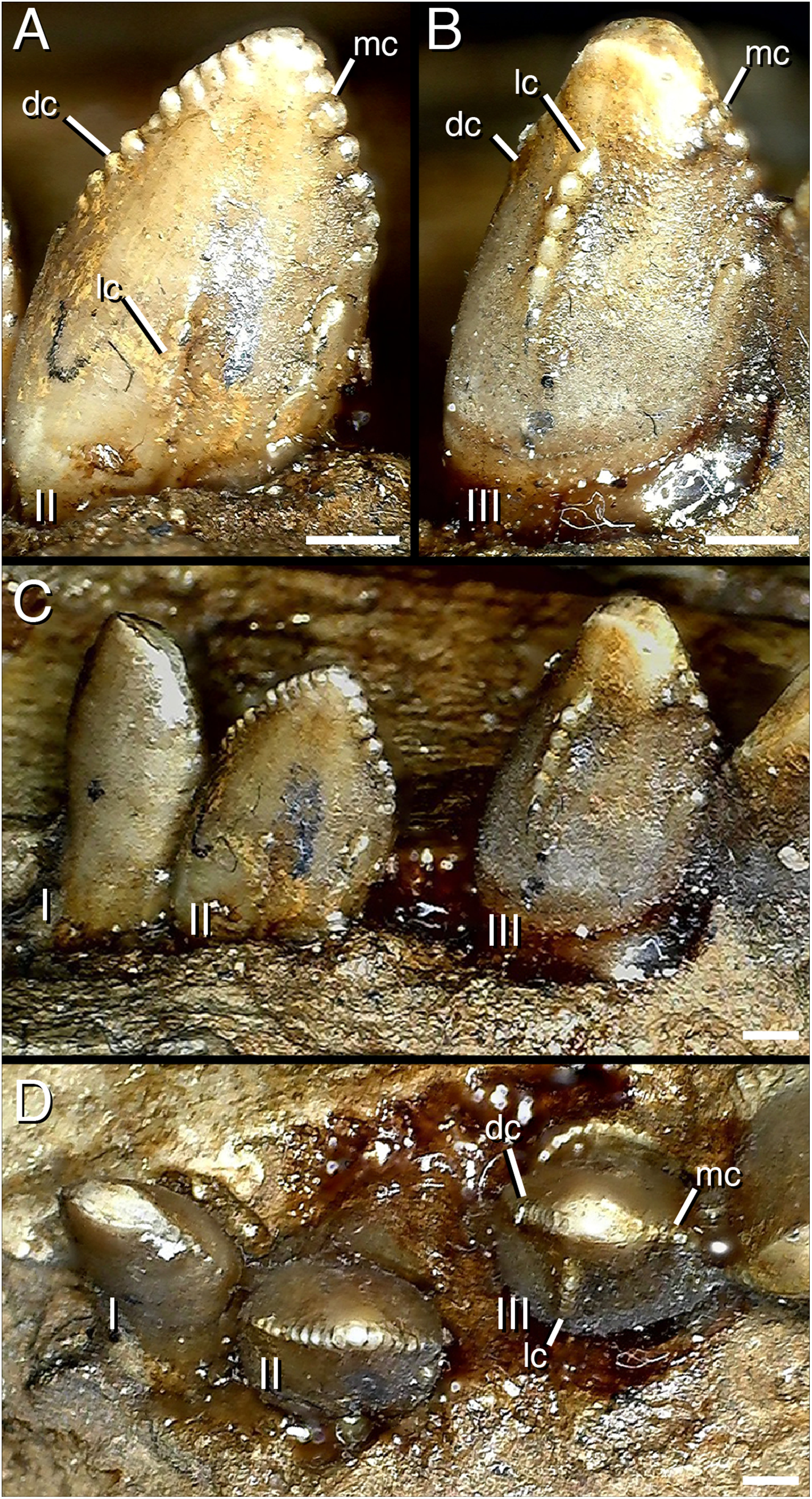
Hindmost dentary teeth showing the third cutting edge (lc), unique to Segnosaurus among theropods

Zanno and colleagues stated in 2016 that therizinosaurs were generally accepted to fall within the spectrum of omnivory and herbivory, with a trend towards intensified herbivory. While various anatomical features have been used to support this idea, tooth morphology had been considered relatively simplistic and with few unique specializations compared to other herbivorous dinosaurs. The few modifications include the increased symmetry in the teeth of Erlikosaurus and the enlargement of denticles in Segnosaurus. Zanno and colleagues identified novel, complex features in the dentary teeth of Segnosaurus, including the presence of additional carinae and folded carinae with denticulated front edges, which indicate Segnosaurus had a higher degree of oral food processing than other therizinosaurs. These traits together created a roughened, shredding surface near the base of the tooth crowns that was unique to Segnosaurus and suggest it consumed unique food resources or used highly specialized feeding strategies. Because multiple geological formations show evidence of sympatric therizinosaur species—related species that lived in the same area at the same time—it is possible niche partitioning between them could have played a role in the group's evolutionary success. This is supported by Segnosaurus with its highly specialized dentition being a contemporary of Erlikosaurus with its relatively indistinct teeth, indicating their partitioning in food acquisition, processing, or resources. This conclusion is also strengthened by the large difference in estimated body masses of sympatric therizinosaurs in the Bayan Shireh Formation, which was up to 500%.

In a 2017 study of niche partitioning in therizinosaurs through digital simulations, Lautenschlager found the dentaries of Segnosaurus experienced one of the lowest stress magnitudes during extrinsic feeding scenarios. Segnosaurus and Erlikosaurus were aided by the down-turned tip of the lower jaws and symphyseal regions, and probably also by beaks, which are known to mitigate stress and strain. By contrast, the straighter and more elongated dentaries of basal therizinosaurs—typical of their coelurosaurian ancestors—had the highest magnitudes of stress and strain. A downwards-pulling motion of the head while gripping vegetation was more likely than a sideways or upwards movement, though such behavior would be more likely in Segnosaurus and Erlikosaurus with their stress-mitigating jaws. Difference in relative bite force between the sympatric Segnosaurus and Erlikosaurus show the former would have been able to feed on tougher vegetation while the overall robustness of the latter suggests greater flexibility in its manner of feeding, because stress levels stayed low across feeding simulations. Lautenschlager agreed the two taxa were adapted to different modes of feeding and food selection; Segnosaurus was more adapted to using its dentition to procure or process food while Erlikosaurus mostly used its beak for cropping and its neck musculature while foraging. The difference in size between Segnosaurus and Erlikosaurus (the former of which is estimated to have weighed more than the latter) indicates these effects were increased and that there were further mechanisms partitioning their resources, such as different heights. Because other therizinosaur taxa were more divided in time and space, other factors than competition within their group may also have contributed to their variation, such as adaptations to different flora and competition with other kinds of herbivores.

In 2018, Loredana Macaluso and colleagues pointed out that the hips of therizinosaurs were peculiar because the shaft of the pubic bone was rotated backwards whereas the pubic boot was strongly projected forwards. While the larger gut associated with herbivory was able to push the shaft backwards, they suggested the pubic boot was restrained by ventilatory muscles that were crucial for cuirassal ventilation—breathing with extra air sacs—which shows the importance of this mode of respiration. In a 2019 study of jaw musculature, Ali Nabavizadeh concluded therizinosaurs were mainly orthal feeders—moving their jaws up and down—and raised their jaws isognathously whereby the upper and lower teeth of each side occluded (contacted each other) at once. The origin and insertion sites of their jaw muscles also added strength to their jaw closure. David J. Button and Zanno found in 2019 herbivorous dinosaurs mainly followed two distinct modes of feeding, either processing food in the gut—characterized by gracile skulls and low bite forces—or the mouth, characterized by features associated with extensive processing. Segnosaurus, along with diplodocoid and titanosaur sauropods, deinocheirid and ornithomimid ornithomimosaurs, and caenagnathids, was found to be in the former category, whereas Erlikosaurus was more similar to some sauropodomorph and ornithischian taxa, indicating these two therizinosaurs were functionally separated and occupied different niches.

== Paleoenvironment ==
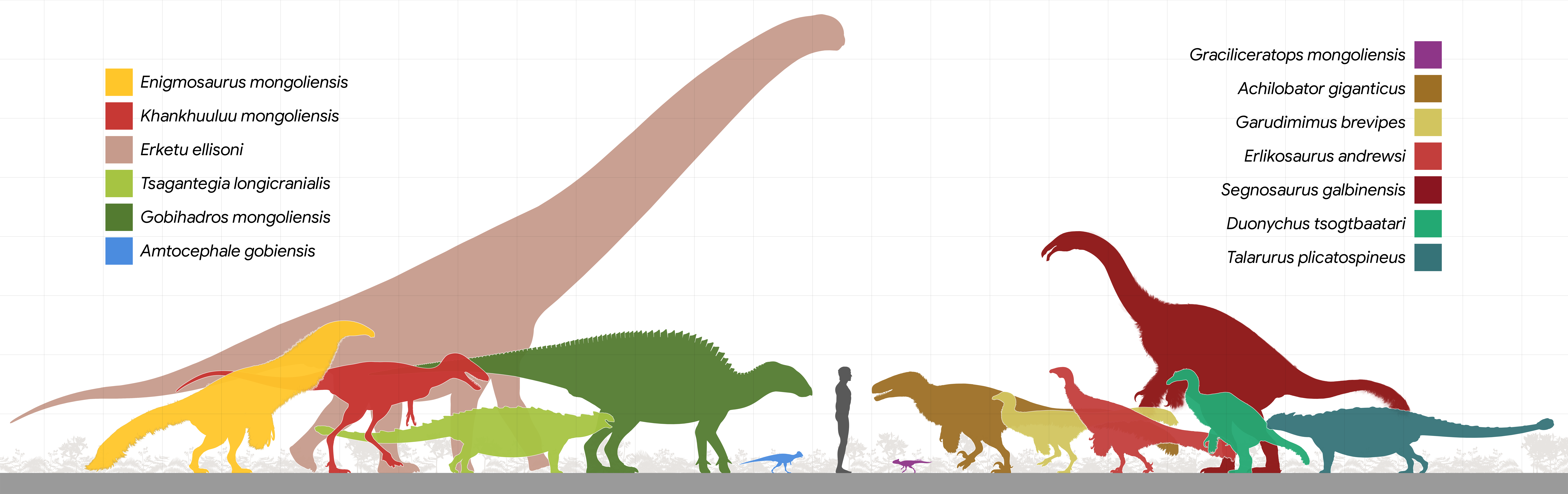
Dinosaurs from the Bayan Shireh Formation compared in size (Segnosaurus fifth from right, in dark red)

Fossils of Segnosaurus have been recovered from the Bayan Shireh Formation in Mongolia, which has been dated to about 102–86 million years ago during the Cenomanian to Turonian stages of the Late Cretaceous period, based on paleomagnetic analysis and U–Pb measurements of calcite. The remains were found in poorly cemented, gray sands containing intraformational conglomerates, gravel, and gray claystone. The Bayan Shireh Formation overlies the Baruunbayan Formation and underlies the Javkhlant Formation. The sediments of these formations were deposited by meandering rivers and lakes on an alluvial plain (flat land consisting of sediments deposited by highland rivers) with a semi-arid climate.

Therizinosaurs were the most abundant theropods in the Bayan Shireh Formation in terms of biodiversity; in addition to Segnosaurus, members of the group included Erlikosaurus, Enigmosaurus, and Duonychus. Other theropods included the tyrannosaur Khankhuuluu, the ornithomimosaur Garudimimus, and the dromaeosaur Achillobator. Other dinosaurs included the ankylosaur Talarurus, the hadrosaur Gobihadros, the sauropod Erketu, and the ceratopsian Graciliceratops. Dinosaur eggs, some of which were identified as Dendroolithidae, as well as footprints of dinosaurs and crocodyliforms, have also been found. The formation is distinctive for its variety and abundance of turtles, and invertebrates include ostracods and freshwater molluscs. The Bayan Shireh Formation is possibly coeval with the Iren Dabasu Formation of the Inner Mongolia region of China, from where therizinosaur fossils similar to those of Segnosaurus and Erlikosaurus have also been found.

== See also ==
- Timeline of therizinosaur research
