= Bayin-Gobi Formation =

Geological formation in China

- Stratigraphic range: Albian
- Type: Geological formation
- Unit of: Yin-E Basin
- Underlies: Suhongtu Formation
- Overlies: Permian metamorphic basement
- Thickness: 100-2120 m

Lithology
- Primary: Mudstone, Siltstone, Conglomerate
- Other: Sandstone

Location
- Region: Asia
- Country: China
- Extent: Inner Mongolia

The Bayin-Gobi Formation (simplified Chinese: 巴音戈壁组; traditional Chinese: 巴音戈壁組; pinyin: Bāyīn Gēbì Zǔ) (also known as Bayan Gobi, or Bayingebi Formation) is a geological formation in Inner Mongolia, north China, whose strata date back to Albian of the Early Cretaceous period. Dinosaur remains are among the fossils that have been recovered from the formation.

== Fossil content ==
Color key: Taxon / Reclassified taxon / Taxon falsely reported as present / Dubious taxon or junior synonym / Ichnotaxon / Ootaxon / Morphotaxon	Notes; Uncertain or tentative taxa are in small text; ~~crossed out~~ taxa are discredited.

=== Dinosaurs ===
==== Ornithischians ====
Ornithischians of the Bayin-Gobi Formation
Genus	Species	Location	Stratigraphic position	Material	Notes	Image
Bayannurosaurus	B. perfectus	Chulumiao	Middle section of the upper half	Nearly complete and semi-articulated skeleton	A large styracosternan iguanodontian	
Penelopognathus	P. weishampeli	Qiriga Village		Isolated right dentary	A hadrosauroid ornithopod	
Ornithischia indet.	Indeterminate	Guaizihu	Upper part	A sacral rib and several partial caudal vertebrae	An ornithischian with vertebral proportions similar to Psittacosaurus	
Psittacosaurus	P. gobiensis	Suhongtu		Skull and skeletons of multiple specimens	A psittacosaurid ceratopsian	

==== Theropods ====
Theropods of the Bayin-Gobi Formation
Genus	Species	Location	Stratigraphic position	Material	Notes	Image
Alxasaurus	A. elesitaiensis	Elesitai Village		Partial skeletons of several specimens	A therizinosauroid theropod	
Bannykus	B. wulatensis	Chaoge		Partial and articulated skeleton lacking skull	A alvarezsauroid theropod	
Dromaeosauridae indet.	Indeterminate	Balongwula		Partial hindlimbs, isolated manual ungual, and ribs	A dromaeosaurid theropod; possibly a microraptorine	

== See also ==
- List of dinosaur-bearing rock formations
