= Copala =

Copala may refer to:

Mexico

- Copala, Guerrero, city in southwestern Mexico
- Copala (municipality) in the State of Guerrero, southwestern Mexico
- Copala, Sinaloa, also known as San José de Copala, 400-year-old silver mining town near Mazatlan in northwestern Mexico
- San Juan Copala, an indigenous Triqui community and autonomous municipality in Oaxaca state

Other

- Copala, a fabled mythical city of gold sought by Spanish conquistadors such as Francisco de Ibarra
- Copala Trique, a variant of the Trique language spoken in San Juan Copala, Oaxaca

== See also ==
- Coppola (disambiguation)
- Copula (disambiguation)
- Cupula (disambiguation)
- Cupola (disambiguation)
