= Coppola (surname) =

Coppola (Italian pronunciation: [ˈkɔppola]) is a common Italian surname. Notable people with the surname include:

== Music ==
- Anton Coppola (1917–2020), American composer and conductor, brother of Carmine Coppola
- Carmine Coppola (1910–1991), American composer, father of August Coppola, Francis Ford Coppola, and Talia Shire
- Carolyn Coppola (Googie) (1950–2008), American singer-songwriter, lead singer for jazz rock band Air
- Piero Coppola (1888–1971), Italian conductor
- Tom Coppola (1945–2023), American musician

== Film and television ==
Listed alphabetically by first name

- Alicia Coppola (born 1968), American television actress
- August Coppola (1934–2009), American author and film executive
- Christopher Coppola (born 1962), American director and digital media entrepreneur
- Eleanor Coppola (1936–2024), American filmmaker
- Francis Ford Coppola (born 1939), American film director, husband of Eleanor Coppola
- Gia Coppola (born 1987 as Gian-Carla Coppola), American filmmaker
- Gian-Carlo Coppola (1963–1986), American film producer
- Horacio Coppola (1906–2012), Argentine photographer and filmmaker
- Nicolas Cage (born 1964 as Nicolas Kim Coppola), American actor
- Roman Coppola (born 1965), American filmmaker
- Sofia Coppola (born 1971), American film director
- Talia Shire (born 1946 as Talia Rose Coppola), American actress

== Sports ==
- Carmine Coppola (footballer) (born 1979), Italian footballer
- Diego Coppola (born 2003), Italian footballer
- Ferdinando Coppola (born 1978), Italian football goalkeeper
- Guillermo Coppola (footballer) (born 1969), Argentine footballer
- Mario Coppola (footballer) (born 1990), Italian footballer

== Crime ==
- Frank J. Coppola (1944–1982), American man executed for murder
- Mike Coppola (mobster) (1900–1966), American mobster in New York City known as "Trigger Mike"
- Mikey Coppola (born 1946), American mobster in New Jersey known as "Mikey Cigars"

== Other fields ==
- Ginny Coppola (born 1949), American politician in Massachusetts, wife of Michael J. Coppola
- Giuseppe Coppola (1821-1902), Italian patriot and revolutionary leader from Erice, Sicily.
- Guillermo Coppola (born 1949), Argentine businessman
- Mario Coppola (1937–2011), Italian physicist
- Michael J. Coppola (1942–2005), American politician in Massachusetts

== See also ==
- Coppola family tree
- Coppola (disambiguation)
