= Mario Coppola =

Mario Coppola may refer to:

- Mario Coppola (footballer) (born 1990), Italian professional footballer
- Mario Coppola (physicist) (1937–2011), Italian physicist active
