= Michael Coppola =

Michael Coppola may refer to:

- Michael J. Coppola (1942–2005), member of the Massachusetts House of Representatives
- Mike Coppola (mobster) (1900–1966), Michael "Trigger Mike" Coppola, member of the Genovese crime family
- Mikey Coppola (born 1946), Michael "Mikey Cigars" Coppola, member of the Genovese crime family

== See also ==
- Coppola (surname)
