= Cupola (disambiguation) =

A cupola is a relatively small, most often dome-like, tall structure on top of a building.

Cupola may also refer to:

== Science, mathematics, and technology ==
- Cupola (cave formation), a recess in the ceiling of a lava tube
- Cupola (geology), a type of igneous rock intrusion
- Cupola (geometry), a geometric solid
- Cupola (ISS module), an observation dome on the International Space Station
- Cupola (military), a small gun turret mounted on a larger one
- Cupola gecko, a species of gecko
- Cupola sign, in medicine, a radiologic sign
- Cupola furnace, a variety of small blast furnace
- Reverberatory furnace, for smelting some non-ferrous metals
- Cupola, an observation area on top of a railway caboose

== Other uses ==
- Sicilian Mafia Commission or Cupola, a body of Sicilian Mafia leaders
- The Cupola (mountain), Tasmania, Australia
- The Cupola, the yearbook of Western New England University, Springfield, Massachusetts, US
- "Cupola", a 2001 song by Zeromancer from Eurotrash

== See also ==
- Cupola House (disambiguation)
- Copala (disambiguation)
- Coppola (disambiguation)
- Copula (disambiguation)
- Cupula (disambiguation)
