= Cupule =

A cupule is a small structure shaped like a cup, including:

- In archeology, rock cupules are circular man-made hollows on the surface of a large rock or a rock slab
  - On a smaller artifact they are called a cupstone.
- In botany: the base of an acorn, see calybium and cupule.
- In entomology, a sucker on the feet of some flies.

== See also ==
- Cupula (disambiguation)
- Copula (disambiguation)
- Cupul
