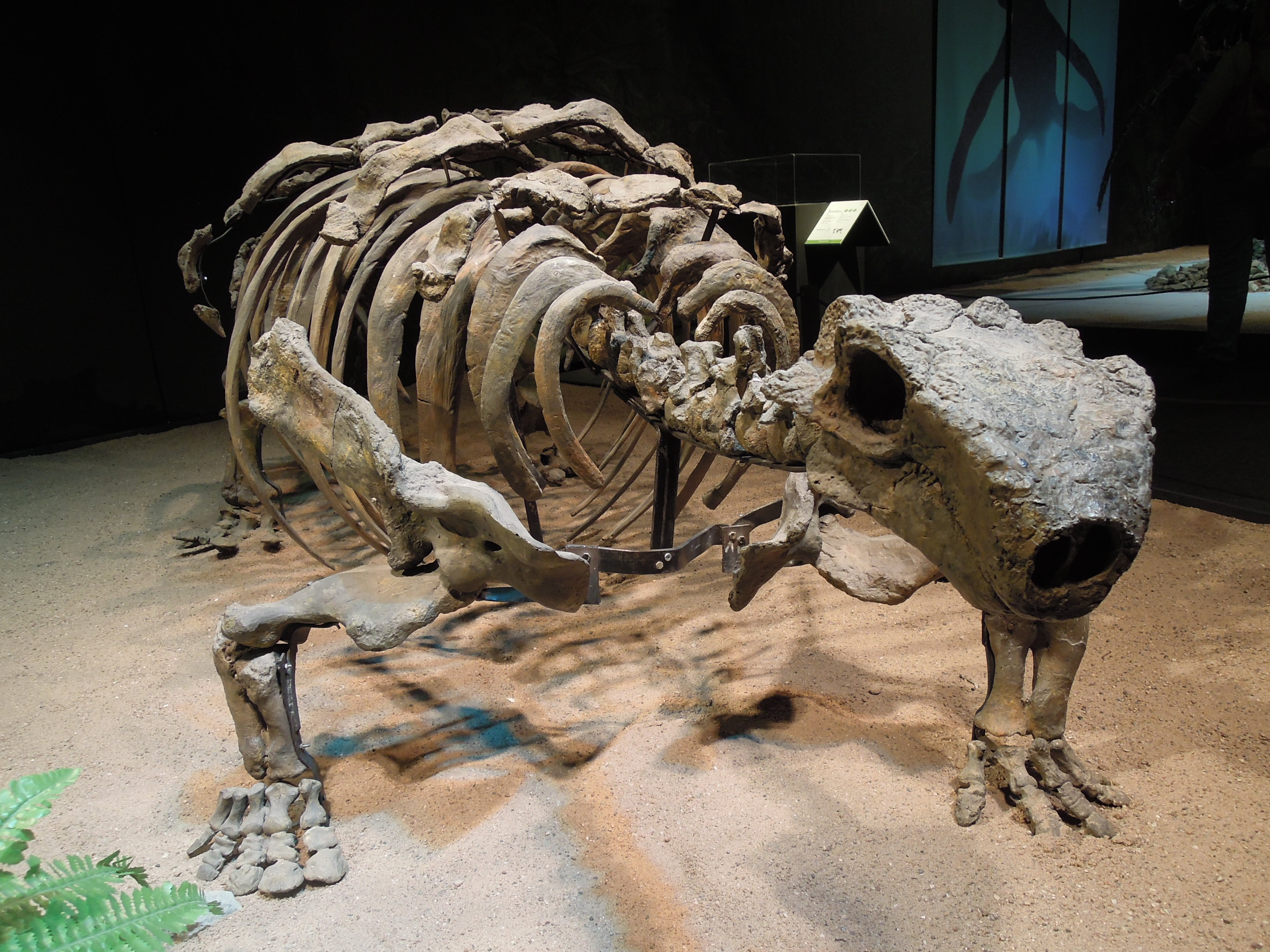
- Frontal view of the mounted skeleton cast in Czech Republic

Scientific classification
- Kingdom: Animalia
- Phylum: Chordata
- Class: Reptilia
- Clade: Dinosauria
- Clade: †Ornithischia
- Clade: †Thyreophora
- Clade: †Ankylosauria
- Family: †Ankylosauridae
- Subfamily: †Ankylosaurinae
- Tribe: †Ankylosaurini
- Genus: †Talarurus; Maleev, 1952

Type species
- †Talarurus plicatospineus Maleev, 1952

= Talarurus =

Talarurus Temporal range: Late Cretaceous, ~96–89 Ma

Ankylosaurid dinosaur genus from the Late Cretaceous

Talarurus (/ˌtæləˈrʊərəs/ TAL-ə-ROOR-əs; meaning "basket tail" or "wicker tail") is a genus of ankylosaurid dinosaur that lived in Asia during the Late Cretaceous period, about 96 million to 89 million years ago. The first remains of Talarurus were discovered in 1948 and later described by the Russian paleontologist Evgeny Maleev with the type species T. plicatospineus. It is known from multiple yet sparse specimens, making it one of the most well known ankylosaurines, along with Pinacosaurus. Elements from the specimens consists of various bones from the body; five skulls have been discovered and assigned to the genus, although the first two were very fragmented.

It was a medium-sized, heavily built, ground-dwelling, quadrupedal herbivore, that could grow up to 5–6 m (16–20 ft) long and weighed about 454 to 907 kg (1,001 to 2,000 lb), nearly a ton. Like other ankylosaurs it had heavy armour and a club on its tail, limiting its speed. Talarurus is classified as a member of the Ankylosauria, in the Ankylosaurinae, a group of derived ankylosaurs. Talarurus is known from the Bayan Shireh Formation, being likely niche partitioned with Tsagantegia, as indicated by its muzzle, which has a rectangular shape specialized for grazing. These represent the oldest known ankylosaurines from Asia, although they are not very closely related to each other. It appears that the closest relative of Talarurus was Nodocephalosaurus, an ankylosaurin with similar facial osteoderms.

Most of the skeletal mounts of Talarurus are outdated by numerous issues, such as the ribs pointing downward instead of to the sides, as in most ankylosaurs; an inaccurate skull cast which is mainly based on related species and not on the available skull material; very splayed arms and legs; four digits on the feet, which in reality only had three as indicated by related ankylosaurines. All of these mistakes were made by anatomical misunderstandings since ankylosaurs were not fully known at that time, also, Talarurus is not known from a complete skeleton.

== History of discovery ==
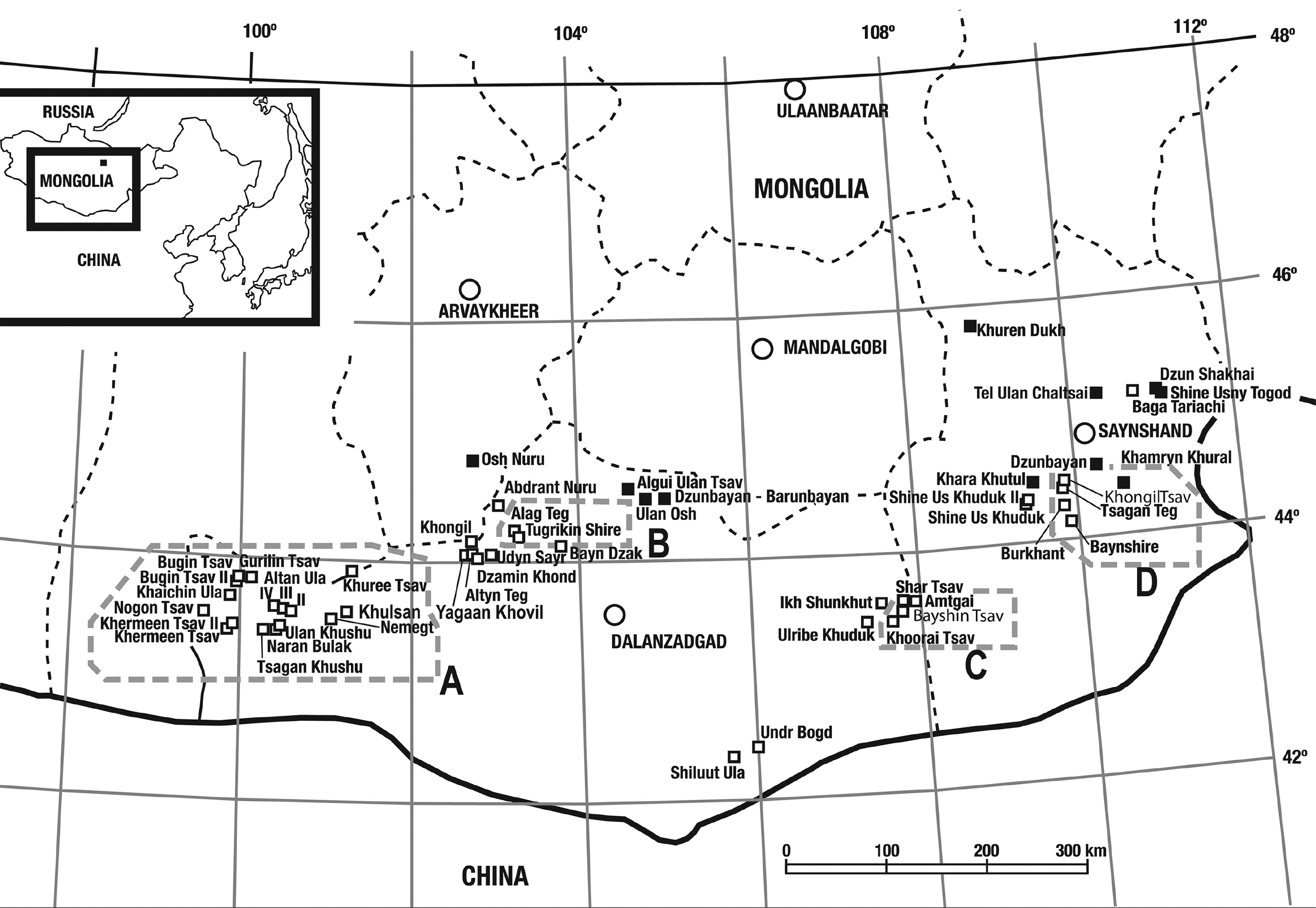
Fossil localities in Mongolia. Talarurus is mainly known from Baynshire and Bayshin Tsav localities.

Talarurus remains have been discovered in the southeastern parts of the Gobi Desert in what is now Mongolia. The holotype specimen PIN 557-91 was discovered in 1948 by the Joint Soviet-Mongolian Paleontological Expedition, and unearthed from sandy, red calcareous claystone at the Baynshire locality of the Bayan Shireh Formation. Talarurus was described and named by the Russian paleontologist Evgeny Maleev in 1952. Specimen PIN 557, the original holotype designated by Maleev, included a fragmentary skull with the posterior part of the skull roof, including the occipital region and the basicranium, numerous vertebrae, several ribs, a scapulocoracoid, a humerus, a radius, an ulna, a nearly complete manus, a partial ilium, an ischium, a femur, a tibia, a fibula, a nearly complete pes, and assorted armor and scutes. The generic name, Talarurus, is derived from the Greek τάλαρος ("tálaros", meaning basket or wicker cage) and οὐρά ("ourā́", meaning rear or tail), in a reference to the club end of the tail which bears resemblance to a wicker basket, and the length of the tail which consists of interlaced bony struts, reminiscent of the weave that is employed when making wicker baskets. The specific name, "plicatospineus", is derived from the Latin plicātus (meaning folded) and spīneus (meaning thorny or spiny), in a reference to the numerous osteoderms that gave form to its armor in life. In fact it consisted of fragmentary remains of six individuals discovered at the site. In 1977, Teresa Maryańska chose PIN 557-91, a posterior rear of the skull, as the holotype, given the irregularities of the combined individuals. Also, she renamed Syrmosaurus disparoserratus into a second species: Talarurus disparoserratus. However, in 1987, this was remade into the separate genus Maleevus. Elements of all these specimens were combined into a skeletal mount exhibited at the Orlov Museum. Although very complete, in several aspects the mount is strongly inaccurate. The type and only valid species known today is Talarurus plicatospineus.

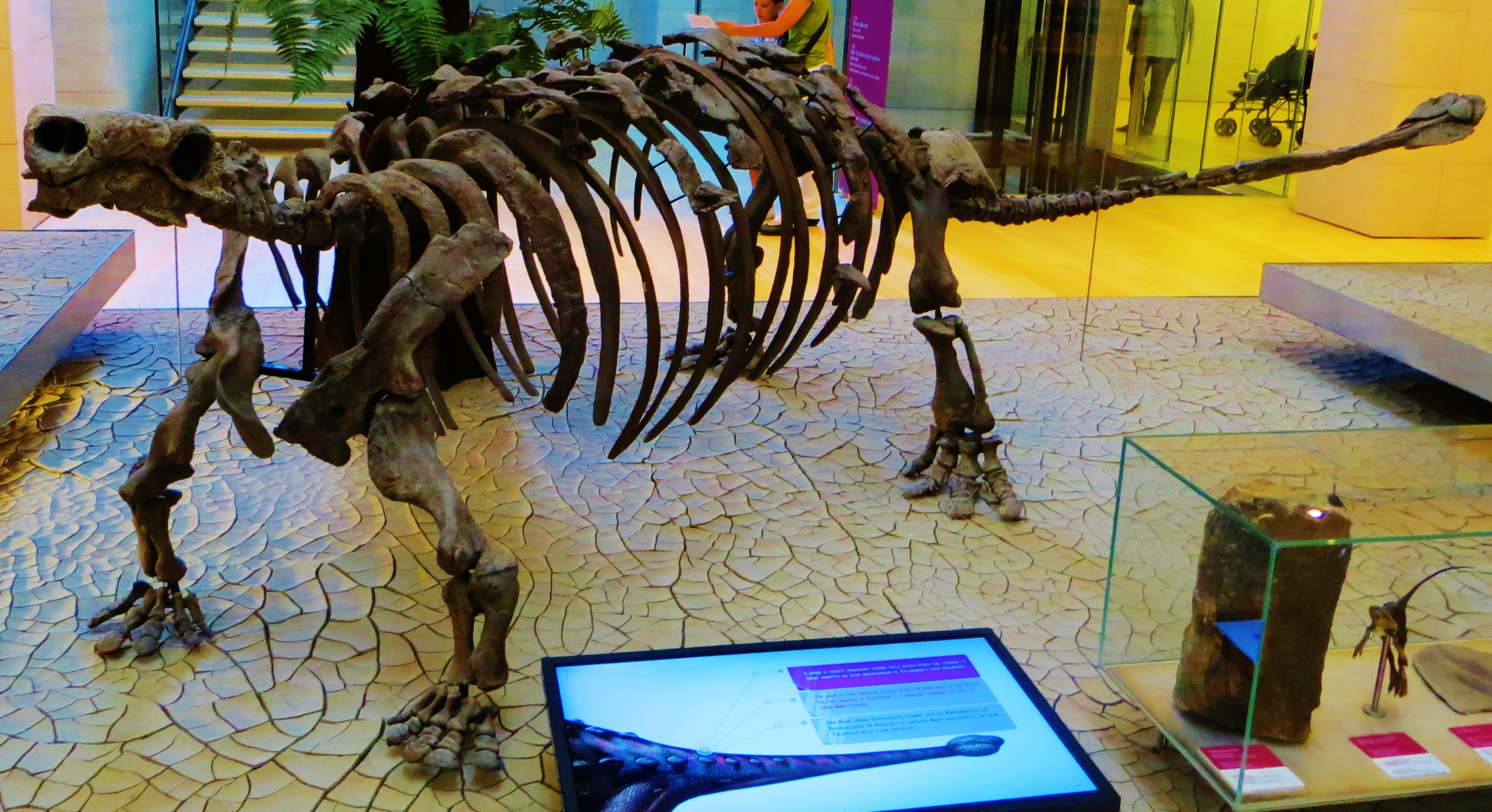
Complete view of the mounted skeleton at MUSE - Science Museum in Trento, featuring unusual traits.

Talarurus is now known from at least a dozen individual specimens from various localities. Specimen PIN 3780/1 was collected from terrestrial sediments at the Bayshin-Tsav locality of the Bayan Shireh Formation, by a joint Soviet-Mongolian Paleontological Expedition in 1975 and is now reposited at the Paleontological Institute, Russian Academy of Sciences, in Moscow. This material was assigned to Talarurus and is also considered to date from the Turonian stage of the Cretaceous. This specimen consists of the top of a skull and a fragmentary skeleton. Since 2006, in the context of the Korea-Mongolia Joint International Dinosaur Project, numerous additional specimens have been referred to Talarurus, found at the Baynshire and Shine Us Khuduk localities. These in 2014 were still undescribed. Another specimen referred to this genus from the Bayshin Tsav locality is composed of an (undescribed) incomplete skull with cranial roof, occipital part and braincase. A second undescribed specimen, collected at the Baga Tarjach locality, consists of a fragment of a maxilla with eight teeth. Arbour have listed many of the referred and additional material for Talarurus.

Even more additional material has been found. In 2007 during the Korea-Mongolia International Dinosaur Expedition, specimens MPC-D 100/1354, MPC-D 100/1355, and MPC-D 100/1356 were collected from the eastern part of the Gobi Desert, at the Bayn Shire locality in the Bayan Shireh Formation. These specimens were described on detail in 2019, consisting of three medium-preserved skulls with additional anatomical and ecological data for Talarurus. This new material is now permanently housed at the Institute of Paleontology and Geology of the Mongolian Academy of Sciences.

== Description ==
Initially, Maleev described Talarurus as having four digits on the foot. However, the foot was not found in articulation; the mounted foot is a composite, and three is the more likely number as all other known ankylosaurids show three toes; earlier reports that Pinacosaurus also possessed four are incorrect. Another presumed characteristics: the osteoderms had a furrowed ornamentation, making a specially formidable armor, with each plate adorned with additional pleated spines. These were also based on a misunderstanding. These were segments of the halfrings protecting the neck, with their typical low keels. The mount has the further peculiarity that it shows Talarurus as built like a hippopotamus, with a barrel-shaped thorax, not with the characteristic ankylosaurid low and wide body type, and the forelimbs are strongly splayed. This was caused by an incorrect positioning of the ribs as if they were appending instead of sticking out sideways; this mistake also prevented a mounting of the wide upper pelvic elements.

=== Size and distinguishing traits ===
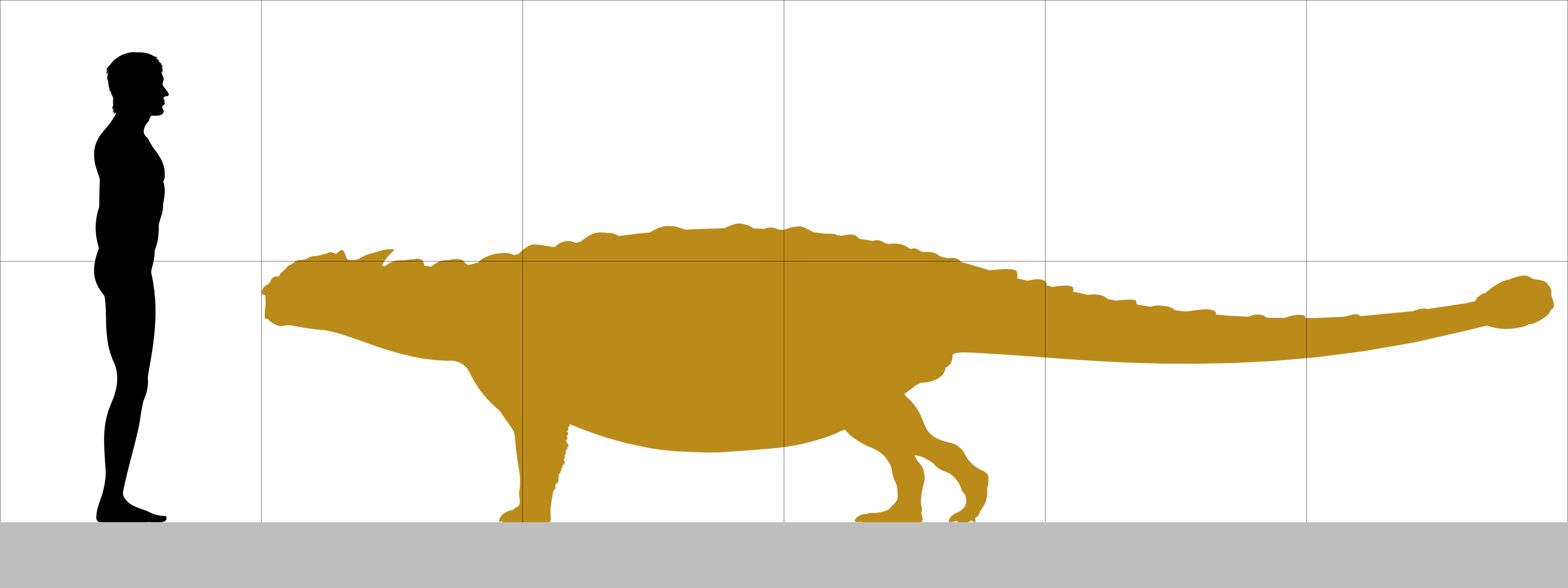
Size compared to a 1.8 m tall human.

Talarurus was a medium sized ankylosaur, Thomas Holtz and Gregory S. Paul estimated its length at 5–6 m (16–20 ft), Paul gave a weight of 2 t (2,000 kg), however, Holtz estimated it around 454 to 907 kg (1,001 to 2,000 lb). Like other ankylosaurids, it had a wide rostrum (beak), a formidable osteoderms running across its body, forming an extensive armor, and the famous tail club. Its limbs were robust and short, supporting a wide and rounded belly. Diagnoses provided by Maleev 1956 and Tumanova 1987, were of limited utility as they largely listed traits shared with many other ankylosaurids. Arbour also noted that the foot in fact had three toes. She established a single autapomorphy: on the frontals, at the middle skull roof, a raised V-shaped region is present. Also she determined that Talarurus differed from all known ankylosaurids with the exception of the American Nodocephalosaurus in the possession of caputegulae on the frontals and nasals, that are cone-shaped with a circular base. However, according to Parks et al. 2019, Talarurus can be distinguished based on diverse rostral characteristics, such as the prominent internarial caputegula, elongated caputegulae, the numerous caputegulae surrounding the nasal area, conical/polygonal-shaped caputegulae, among others.

=== Skull ===
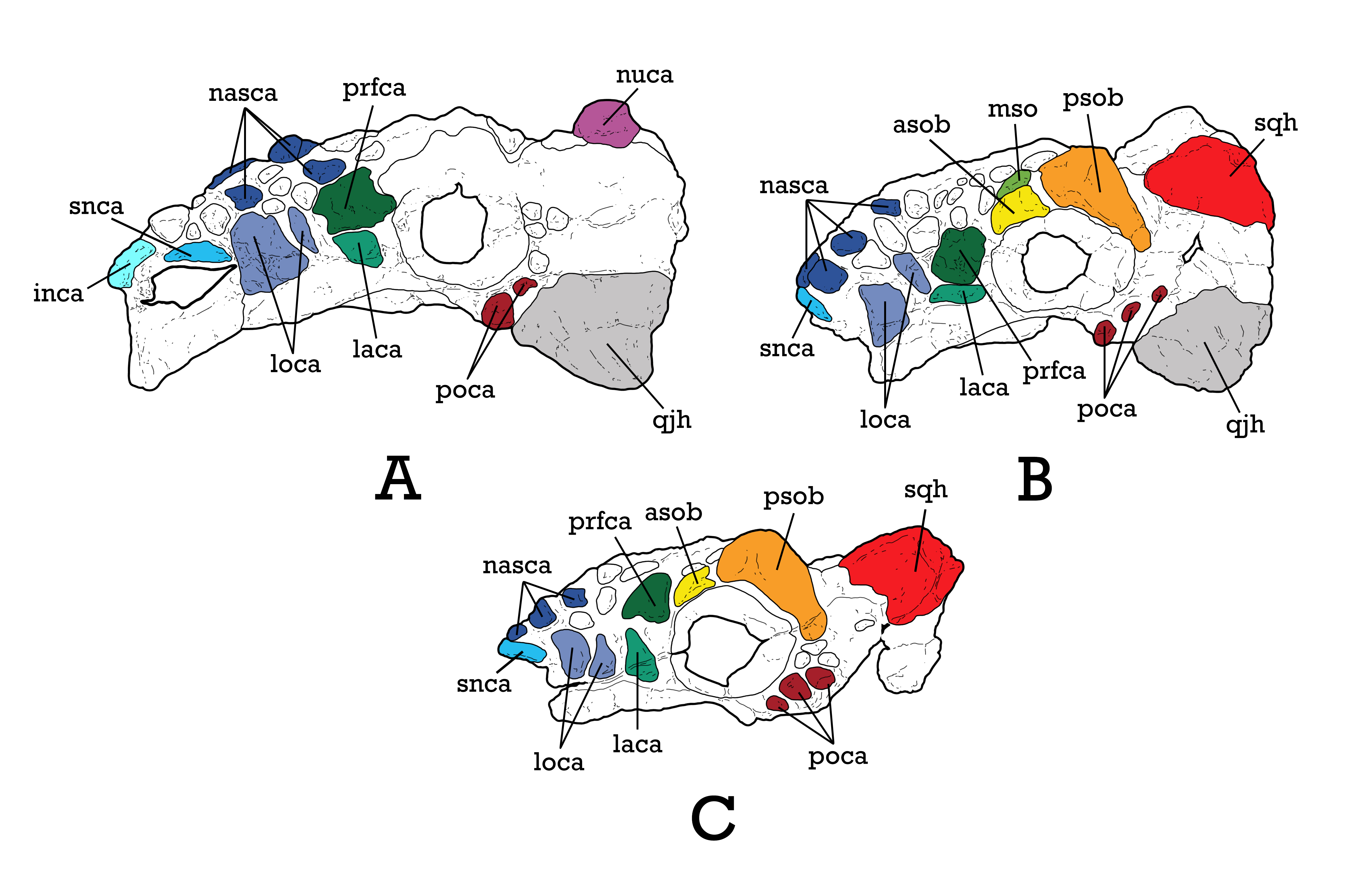
Diagram featuring the most complete skulls: A) MPC-D 100/1354, B) MPC-D 100/1355 and C) MPC-D 100/1356.

The skull of Talarurus measured about 30 centimetres (300 mm) in total length. The holotype, PIN 557-91, is based only on a posterior skull roof, which features tubercle-like caputegulae (facial osteoderms or armor tiles) that resemble those of Nodocephalosaurus. As noted by Arbour and Currie, the skull roof of PIN 3780/1 appears to have slightly different caputegulae (head osteoderms or armour tiles), and that it was unclear if this represents a taxonomic issue. Nevertheless, all the referred skulls share the same patterns of caputegulae (although little variation among individuals is observable) and therefore referable to the genus. The most complete skull is MPC-D 100/1354. It nicely preserves the maxillary rostrum, which is broad and semi-rectangular in shape and fused, no teeth are found in this zone; probably useful on flat surfaces. As expected, the caputegulae are poligon to tubercle-shaped, with some being present on the nasal area. Each maxilla preserves 23 alveoli, however, the teeth were not preserved. Most of the caputegulae present in the top of the head are hexagonal in shape, in the holotype PIN 557-91 some are triangular. The orbitals are strongly armored with some osteoderms behind them. In MPC-D 100/1355 and MPC-D 100/1356 the squamosal and quadratojugal horns are thick and triangular, with the squamosals being more rounded. Usually, the lower jaw remains of Talarurus do not preserve, however, MPC-D 100/1355 was found in association with a right dentary, very fragmented though.

=== Postcranial skeleton ===
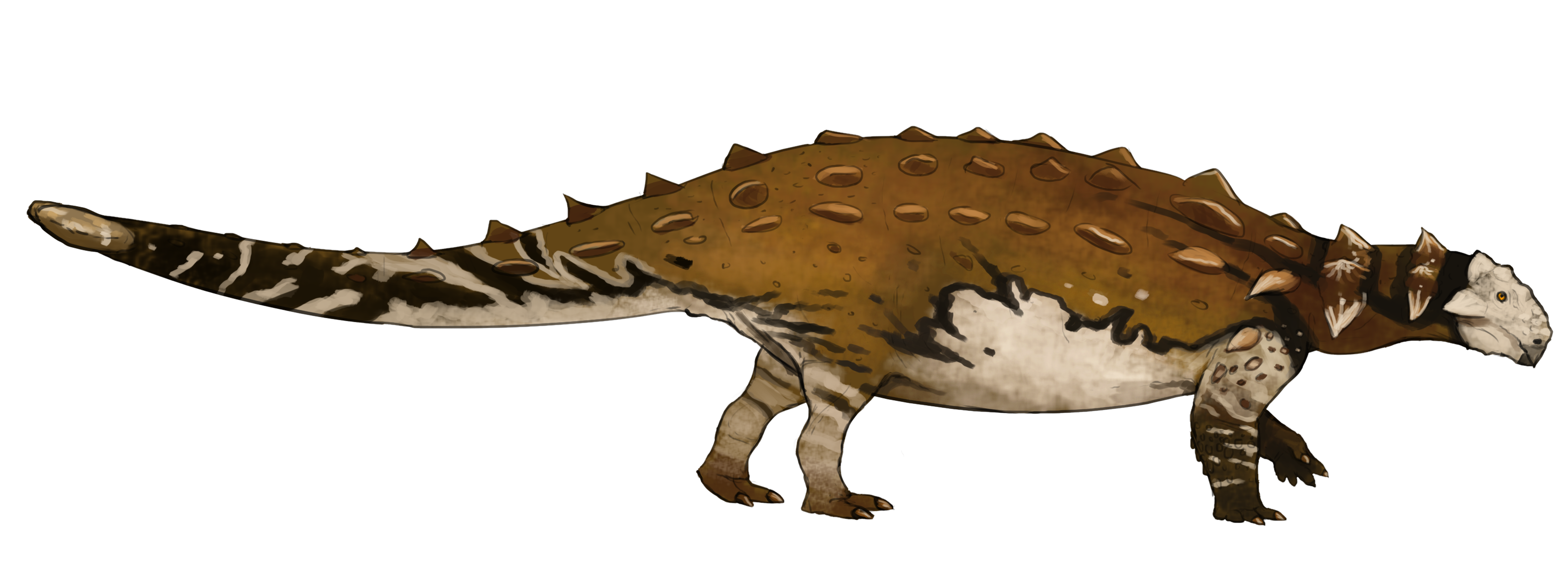
Life restoration

Most of the postcranial remains are known from fragmentary individuals. Based on the PIN 557 specimens, the ribs are strongly curved and thickened, having a length ranging between 50 and 100 cm (500 and 1,000 mm). The vertebral area is partially missing, preserving some cervicals, dorsals, caudals and the sacrum. The cervical vertebrae are amphicoelous (concave on both sides) with thickened centra (body), the neural arches are slightly higher. The dorsals have high, wide centra, and they are also amphicoelous with very elongated and robustly built neural arches; some are broken. More complete than the previous sections, the sacrum consists of 4 presacrals, 4 sacrals, and the first caudal vertebra, these vertebrae are fused together, with some ribs attached. Their size gradually increases from backward to forwards. Some isolated caudal vertebrae are present, they seem to indicate that the tail consisted of approximately 25 to 30 caudals. The anteriormost caudals have somewhat elongated neural arches and centra, the chevrons are fused and triangle-shaped. In contrast, the posteriormost caudals have very flattened chevrons and neural arches. Due to the partial preservation of the specimens, the exact osteoderm arrangement is unknown, however, some have been unearthed. The preserved osteoderms are very sparse, consisting of some cervical halfrings and spine-shaped body osteoderms. The osteoderms are strongly robust, most spine-shaped osteoderms measured 15 cm (150 mm) in height. MPC-D 100/1355 was found in association with a partial halfring, as well as other body elements.

Only the left manus is preserved, it is virtually complete preserving five digits, only lacking some unguals and phalanges. The preserved left pes is unique; it was described as having four digits, this statement however, was proved to be a product of the initial skeleton mount and three digits is more accurate/likely, as seen in related ankylosaurines. In general terms, both manus and pes metatarsals are strongly robust and stocky. The shoulder girdle is represented by a scapulocoracoid that measures about 60 cm (600 mm) long, humerus, radius and ulna, these elements are very robust compared to other postcrania and they pertain to the left arm. The left scapulocoracoid is very robust with a well developed insertion for the humerus (glenoid), although the scapular blade is somewhat shortened in length. The humerus is very wide at the ends and thickened measuring 33.5 cm (335 mm) long; it shows some resemblance to that of Ankylosaurus. Although fragmentary, the pelvic girdle is represented by a partial and flattened ilium with the ischium. Hindlimb elements include the right femur and left tibia. The preserved femur is straight and strongly robust, the greater trochanter is fused with the lesser trochanter; it measures 47 cm (470 mm) long. The tibia however, is more shortened but greatly wide, it has a total length of 29.8 cm (298 mm). In addition, a fibula was also preserved, it has a length of 26.7 cm (267 mm). Overall, the fibula is more straight and thin compared to the femur and tibia, its distal end is more wide than the proximal end.

== Classification ==
Ankylosaurid phylogenetic relations are hard to determine because many taxa are only partially known, the exact armour configuration has rarely been preserved, fused osteoderms obscure many details of the skull and the Ankylosauridae are conservative in their postcranial skeleton, showing little variation in their vertebrae, pelves and limbs. Previously it was assumed that as one of the oldest known ankylosaurids, Talarurus possessed some basal characters that are shared with nodosaurids but were later lost in more advanced ankylosaurs, such as the presence of four toes. However, the presumed "primitive" traits proved to be largely artefacts of the initial skeletal restoration. Recent phylogenetic analysis provides evidence for an assignment of Talarurus to the Ankylosaurinae, a derived ankylosaurid group. This can be reconciled with its relatively old geological age by the possibility that the Ankylosauridae as a whole appeared much earlier during the Early Jurassic, which must have been true if they were the sister group of the Nodosauridae in the sense proposed by Coombs in 1978; i.e. if all polacanthines were nodosaurids.

Talarurus was assigned to the Syrmosauridae (now known as Ankylosauridae) by Maleev in its original description in 1952. Walter Preston Coombs suggested that it was the same dinosaur as Euoplocephalus although subsequent study did not support this assertion. Maryańska demonstrated that it differed from Euoplocephalus, citing the shape of the skull, the morphology of the palate, and the presence of four pedal digits. Vickaryous et al. 2004 note the presence of two distinct ankylosaurid clades during the Late Cretaceous, one consisting of North American taxa and the other restricted to Asian taxa. However, Arbour in 2014 recovered trees in which Talarurus was more closely related to North-American forms than to Asian ankylosaurids. In some of these Talarurus was the sister species of Nodocephalosaurus.

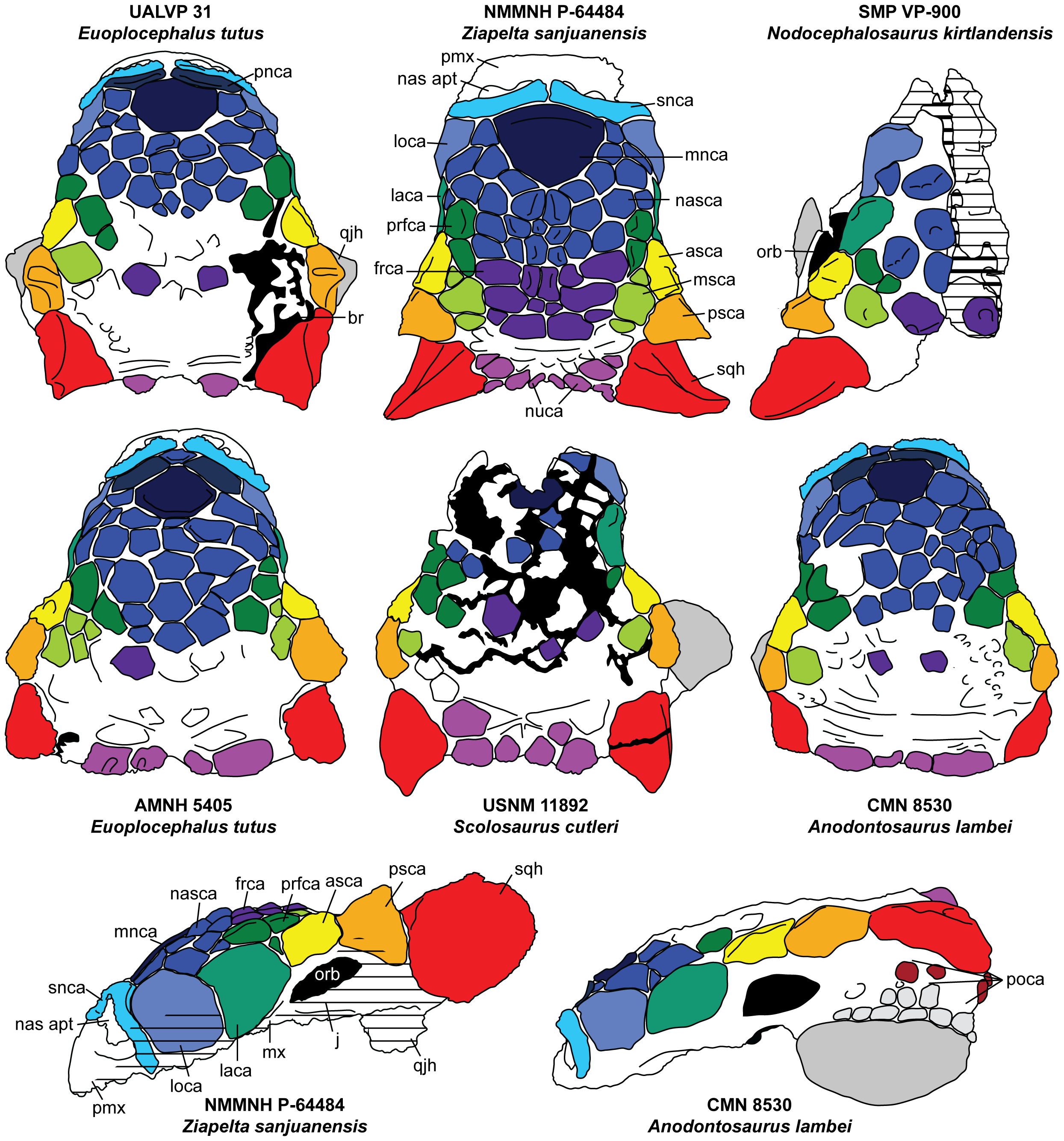
Comparison between the skull of Euoplocephalus and other North American ankylosaur taxa. Note the presence of Nodocephalosaurus, the closest relative of Talarurus.

- Ankylosaurinae
  - Crichtonpelta
  - - Tsagantegia
    - Zhejiangosaurus
    - Pinacosaurus
    - - - Saichania
        - - Tarchia
          - Zaraapelta
      - Ankylosaurini
        - Dyoplosaurus
        - - - Talarurus
            - Nodocephalosaurus
          - - - Ankylosaurus
              - Anodontosaurus
            - Euoplocephalus
            - - Scolosaurus
              - Ziapelta

== Paleobiology ==
The 2007 specimen skulls have brought new insights into the neurocranial capacities and dietary habits of Talarurus, specifically the specimen MPC-D 100/1354, which is a well-preserved, almost complete cranium. MPC-D 100/1354 was described in extensive detail along with a very complete skull of Tarchia by Paulina-Carabajal et al. 2017. They noted that ankylosaurids had well-developed gaze stabilization and auditive senses, differing from nodosaurids, by examining the endocranial region of the selected specimens. The presence of the flocculus was first reported in Talarurus by Maryańska and later in other related ankylosaurids, however, this lobe seems to be absent or reduced in nodosaurids. The flocculus is relatively large on most ankylosaurids. Another neuroanatomical character is the elongated lagena, which is prominent in Euoplocephalus, Tarchia and Talarurus. This anatomical feature indicates that ankylosaurids had a large range of sound perception, especially for low frequencies. In addition to these findings, the preserved rostrum in MPC-D 100/1354 is broad, almost rectangular in shape and somewhat stocky. The wide rostrum of Talarurus probably worked with efficiency on low vegetation at flat terrain. Evidence seems to indicate that Talarurus had a grazer feeding-method.

== Paleoenvironment ==
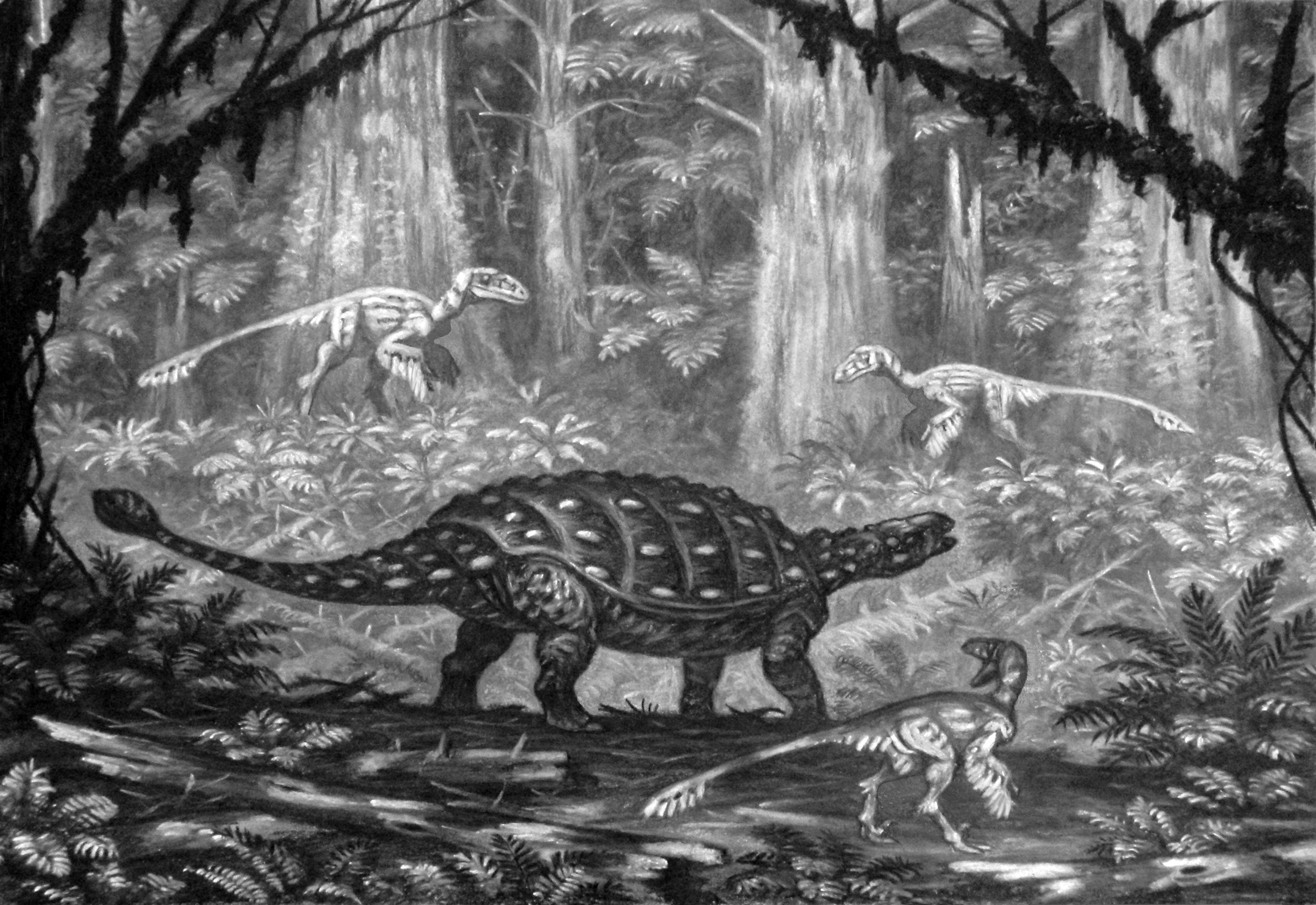
Life restoration of a Talarurus being preyed by an Achillobator pack.

The fossil remains of Talarurus have been found in the sediments of Bayan Shireh Formation, which are thought to date from the Cenomanian to Santonian stages of the Late Cretaceous period, about 96 million to 89 million years ago. According to Park et al. 2019, Talarurus filled the niche of a grazer herbivore, whereas Tsagantegia, another ankylosaurid from the formation, filled the niche of a browser herbivore. For instance, Talarurus had a broad and rectangular snout (or beak), useful for low vegetation, while the one in Tsagantegia is more elongated and shovel-shaped, useful for high vegetation. In order to illustrate this differentiation strategy, they compared the ankylosaurids to the extant African white and black rhinoceros: the white rhinoceros is equipped with a broad and rectangular snout, specialized for grazing. The black rhinoceros in the other hand, has a pointed snout for browsing. With these anatomical features and example, it is clear that these taxa were niche partitioned. Another case of niche partitioning can be observed on the therizinosaurids Erlikosaurus and Segnosaurus, taxa that were also discovered in the formation.

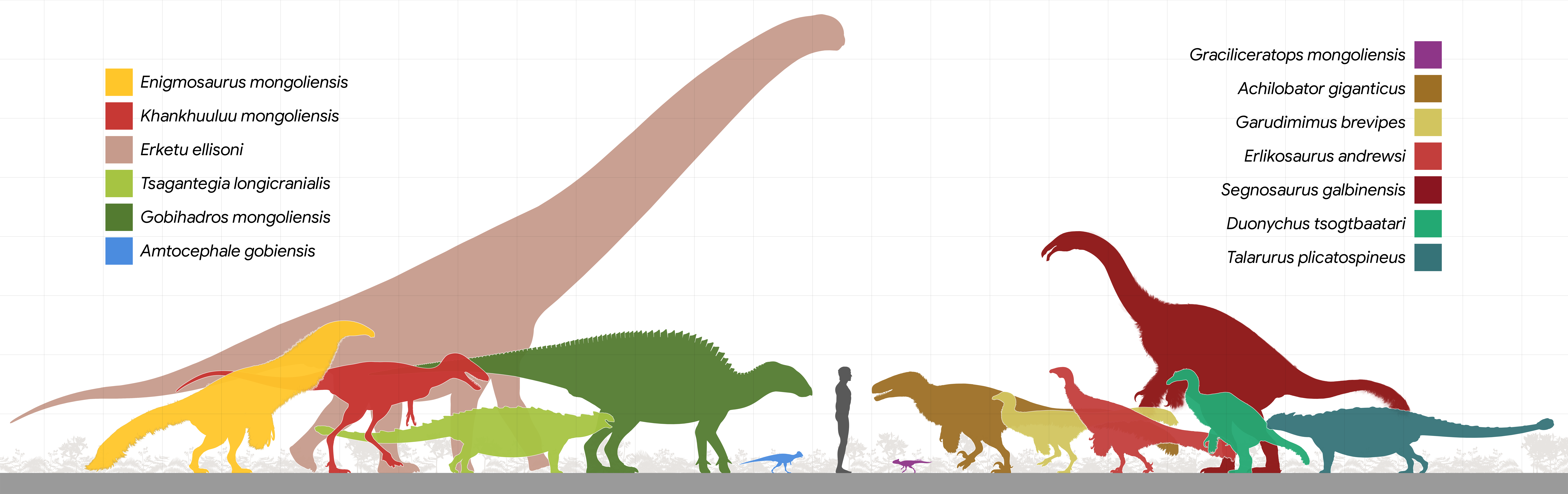
Talarurus compared to the Dinosauria from the Bayan Shireh Formation (Talarurus in light red, sixth from right).

Found in Late Cretaceous localities such as Baynshire and Bayshin Tsav, taxa that were contemporaneous with Talarurus in the Upper Bayan Shireh included a diverse dinosaur fauna, such as the tyrannosauroid Khankhuuluu, the large dromaeosaurid Achillobator, the therizinosaurids Erlikosaurus and Segnosaurus, the ornithomimosaur Garudimimus, the small and likely immature ceratopsid Graciliceratops, the small hadrosauroid Gobihadros, and its ecological counterpart, Tsagantegia. Based on the caliche, fluvial and lacustrine sedimentation, the Bayan Shireh Formation was a large semiarid terrain with meanders and lakes, along with the strong presence of angiosperm and gymnosperm plants all over the zone. According to some biostratigraphic occurrences within Asiatic formations, there was a likely correlation between the Iren Dabasu Formation and the Bayan Shireh Formation.

== See also ==
- Timeline of ankylosaur research
