= Cupula =

A cupula is a small, inverted cup or dome-shaped cap over a structure, including:

- Ampullary cupula, a structure in the vestibular system, providing the sense of spatial orientation
- Cochlear cupula, a structure in the cochlea
- Cupula of the pleura, related to the lungs
- The cervical parietal pleura in the thorax
- A layer in the otolith organs
- The cupula optica, or optic cup, in embryological development of the eye
- Cup-like structure fitted over the eye during electrophysiology study
- Suprapleural membrane

== See also ==
- Cupola (disambiguation)
- Copula (disambiguation)
- Cupule (disambiguation)
