= Cupola House =

Cupola House may refer to:

- Cupola House, Bury St Edmunds, Suffolk, England
- Cupola House (Edenton, North Carolina), United States
- Cupola House (Egg Harbor, Wisconsin), United States
