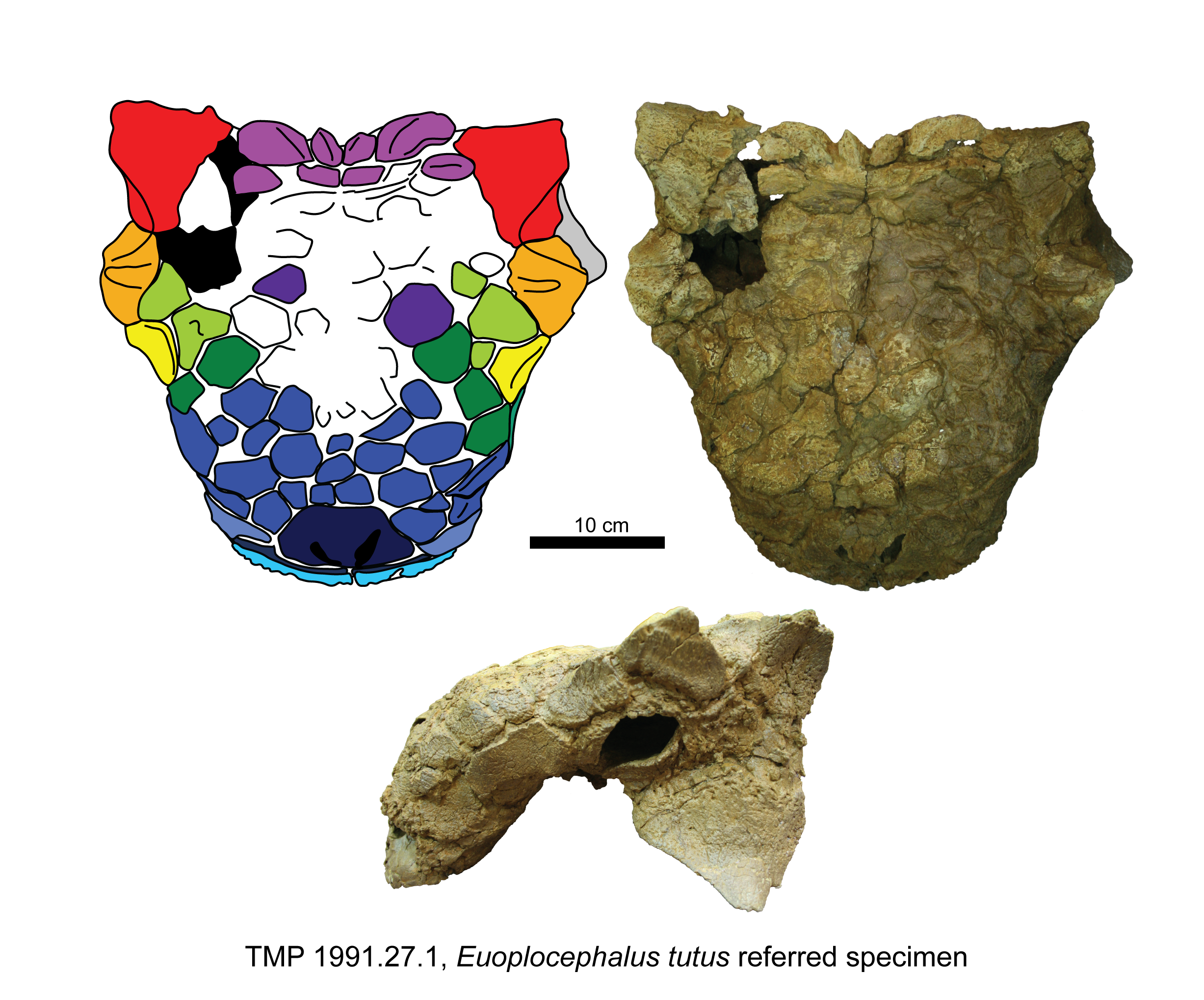
- Skull of specimen TMP 1991.127.1

Scientific classification
- Kingdom: Animalia
- Phylum: Chordata
- Class: Reptilia
- Clade: Dinosauria
- Clade: †Ornithischia
- Clade: †Thyreophora
- Clade: †Ankylosauria
- Family: †Ankylosauridae
- Subfamily: †Ankylosaurinae
- Tribe: †Ankylosaurini
- Genus: †Euoplocephalus; Lambe, 1910

Type species
- †Euoplocephalus tutus Lambe, 1902

= Euoplocephalus =

Euoplocephalus Temporal range: Late Cretaceous (Campanian), 76.4–75.6 Ma

Genus of ankylosaurid dinosaur from the Late Cretaceous period

Euoplocephalus (/juːˌɒploʊˈsɛfələs/ yoo-OP-loh-SEF-ə-ləs) is a genus of large herbivorous ankylosaurid dinosaurs, living during the Late Cretaceous of Canada. It has only one named species, Euoplocephalus tutus.

The first fossil of Euoplocephalus was found in 1897 in Alberta. In 1902, it was named Stereocephalus, but that name had already been given to an insect, so it was changed in 1910. Later, many more ankylosaurid remains were found from the Campanian of North America and often made separate genera. In 1971, Walter Coombs concluded that they all belonged to Euoplocephalus, which then make it one of the best-known dinosaurs. Recently, however, experts have come to the opposite conclusion, limiting the authentic finds of Euoplocephalus to about a dozen specimens. These include a number of almost complete skeletons, so nevertheless much is known about the build of the animal.

Euoplocephalus reached 5.3 metres (17 ft) in length and 2 metric tons (2.2 short tons) in body mass. Its body was low-slung and very flat and wide, standing on four sturdy legs. Its head had a short drooping snout with a horny beak to bite off plants that were digested in the large gut. Like other ankylosaurids, Euoplocephalus was largely covered by bony armor plates, among them rows of large high-ridged oval scutes. The neck was protected by two bone rings. It could also actively defend itself against predators like Albertosaurus, Daspletosaurus, and Gorgosaurus using a heavy club at the end of its tail.

== Description ==
=== Size ===
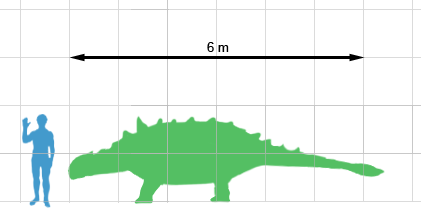
Size of specimen AMNH 5405 compared with a human.

Among the ankylosaurids, Euoplocephalus was exceeded in size only by Ankylosaurus, and perhaps Tarchia and Cedarpelta. Euoplocephalus was about 5.3 metres (17 ft) long and weighed about 2 metric tons (2.2 short tons). Like other ankylosaurids, it had a very broad and flat low-slung torso, about four feet high, positioned on four short legs.

=== Distinguishing traits ===
The skull of Euoplocephalus can be distinguished from most other ankylosaurids by several anatomical details, including: the pattern of bony sculpturing in the region in front of the eyes; the form of the palpebral bones (small bones over the eyes), which may have served as bony eyelids; the shallowness of the nasal vestibule at the entrance of the nasal cavity; the medial curve of the tooth rows in the upper jaw; and the teeth, which are relatively small, lacking true cingula, and having variable fluting of the denticles. However, these traits are shared with a number of closely related forms, some of which in the past have been included in the genus. Combining such forms, Walter Coombs and Teresa Maryańska in 1990 stated that Euoplocephalus could be distinguished based on four traits. The premaxillae, the front snout bones, are not covered by dermal ossifications. The external bony nostrils are slit-like, face to the front and are each divided by a vertical bone sheet or septum. The beak has a width equal to or greater than the distance between the rear maxillary, upper cheek, teeth rows. The foot has three digits, metatarsals with toes.

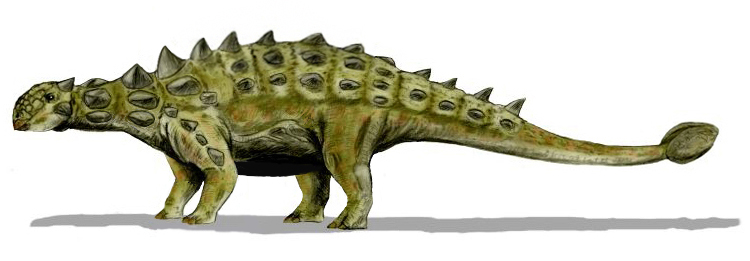
Restoration

In 2013, Victoria Arbour and Phil Currie provided a differential diagnosis, setting Euoplocephalus apart from its nearest relatives. When compared with Anodontosaurus and Scolosaurus, Euoplocephalus lacks round osteoderms at the base of the squamosal and quadratojugal horns. Compared with Anodontosaurus it lacks small osteoderms at the bases of the large osteoderms on the first cervical half-ring, but, contrary to that genus, does in top view have large rounded osteoderms at the sides of the tail club. It differs from Dyoplosaurus in possessing sacral ribs that perpendicularly point outwards. It differs from Scolosaurus in possessing keeled osteoderms with a round or oval base on the top and sides of the first cervical half-ring and having a shorter rear blade of the ilium. Euoplocephalus differs from Ankylosaurus in possessing anteriorly directed external nostrils and in lacking a continuous keel between the squamosal horn and the supraorbitals.

=== Skeleton ===
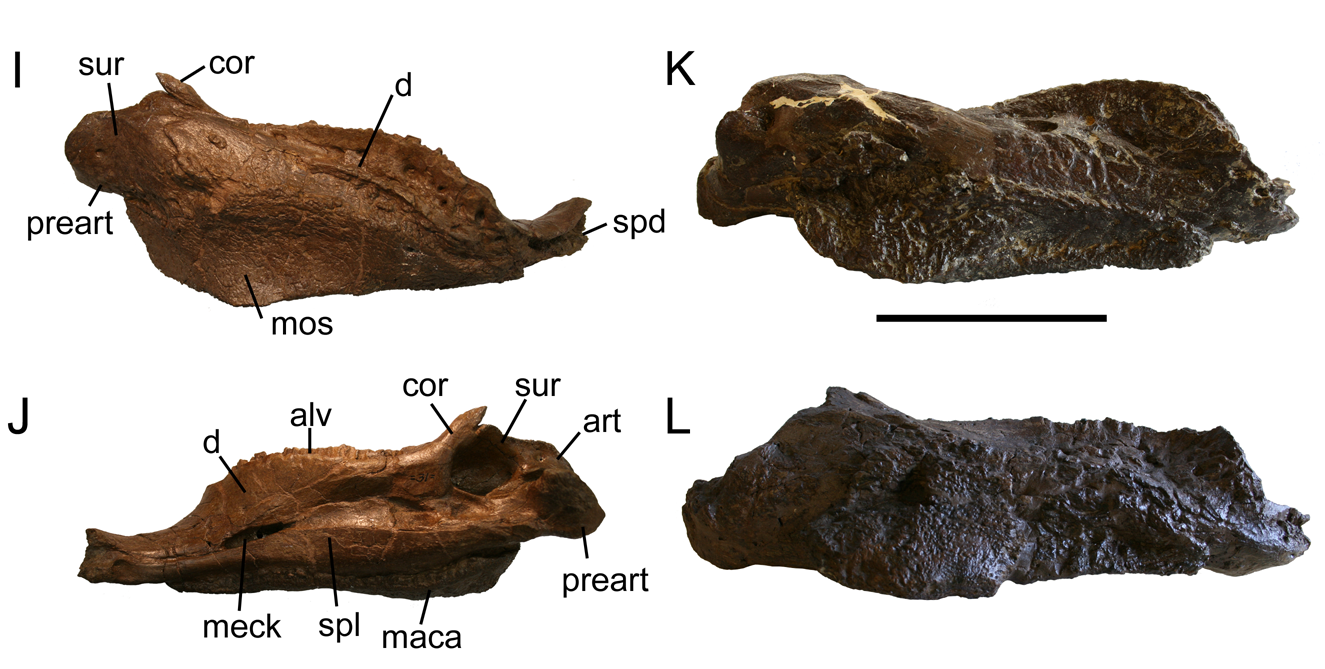
Mandibles (I, J), with those of related genera

The skull of Euoplocephalus resembles a truncated equilateral triangle when viewed from above, and is slightly wider than it is long. The largest known skull, that of specimen AMNH 5403, has a length of 411 millimetres and a width of 478 millimetres. Most skull elements are completely fused and two skull openings normally present with dinosaurs, the antorbital fenestra and the upper temporal fenestra, have closed. The skull has nineteen to twenty-four teeth in each upper jaw. The frontmost snout bone, the premaxilla, is toothless. The teeth are very small, with a maximal height and width of just 7.5 millimetres. The strongly drooping snout is blunt, wide and high, and filled with very complex air passages and sinuses, the form and function of which are not yet completely understood. Each side has two external nostrils. The lower jaw has a very concave upper rim with twenty-one teeth. At its front a short low extension is present, to provide contact with the wide predentary, the bony core of the lower horny beak, that fitted within the upper beak of the snout.

As in most quadrupedal ornithischians, its neck is moderately short. The scapula is massive and robust, and the very robust forelimbs are shorter than the hindlimbs. The tail is long and ends in a bony club. Old restorations of Euoplocephalus and rejected synonyms (Dyoplosaurus, Scolosaurus) often show a club with two large vertical spikes. This is an error based on a restoration of Scolosaurus by Franz Nopcsa; the specimen he used had an incomplete tail that stopped just beyond the pair of conical spikes now known to have been positioned halfway along its length. He restored the tail as ending just after the spines. Other artists combined the spikes with the tail club, compounding the inaccuracy. The narrow distal half of the tail is stiffened by bundles of ossified tendons.

The vertebral column of Euoplocephalus is made up of at least seven cervical vertebrae, at least eleven "free" dorsal vertebrae, typically four sacrodorsals forming a fused "sacral rod" in front of the sacrum proper, three "true" sacral vertebrae, and between one and four caudosacrals. Like with other ankylosaurians, the last four dorsal vertebrae and the first caudal vertebra are thus fused to the sacrum, forming a reinforced synsacrum of at least eight vertebrae, the spines of which form a fused supraneural plate, also incorporating the zygapophyses. There are at least twenty-one caudal vertebrae; the total number of caudal vertebrae is uncertain because approximately ten are fused to form part of the tail club, bringing the total to about thirty. This fusion is also seen in other ankylosaurids; it is possible that the extent of fusion is an age-related feature.

The humerus is very robust with strongly expanded upper and lower joints, combined with a narrow shaft. On the upper shaft an enormous deltopectoral crest is present of which the lower part does not gradually merge with the shaft but is warped to the front, forming a thick knob or lip. All this indicates a very heavy musculature. In the lower arm the robust ulna has a well-developed olecranon process. The wrist and hand bones are not well known. In the pelvis, the front blade of the ilium splayed out to the front, reaching all the way to the widest point of the belly to support the gut. This blade also forms a bone shelf at the rear side of the body. The rear blade of the ilium is shorter than the diameter of the hip socket it was located behind, meaning the leg is located at the rear end of the pelvis, near the tail base and much closer to the midline than the belly sides. The pubic bone is unknown. The ischium is a short, curved, vertically positioned bone strap. The thighbone is short, robust and straight with a low fourth trochanter positioned below the midpoint of the shaft. The robust shinbone is shorter than the thighbone. The foot is not well known but functionally tridactyl with hoof-shaped instead of sharp claws.

=== Armor ===
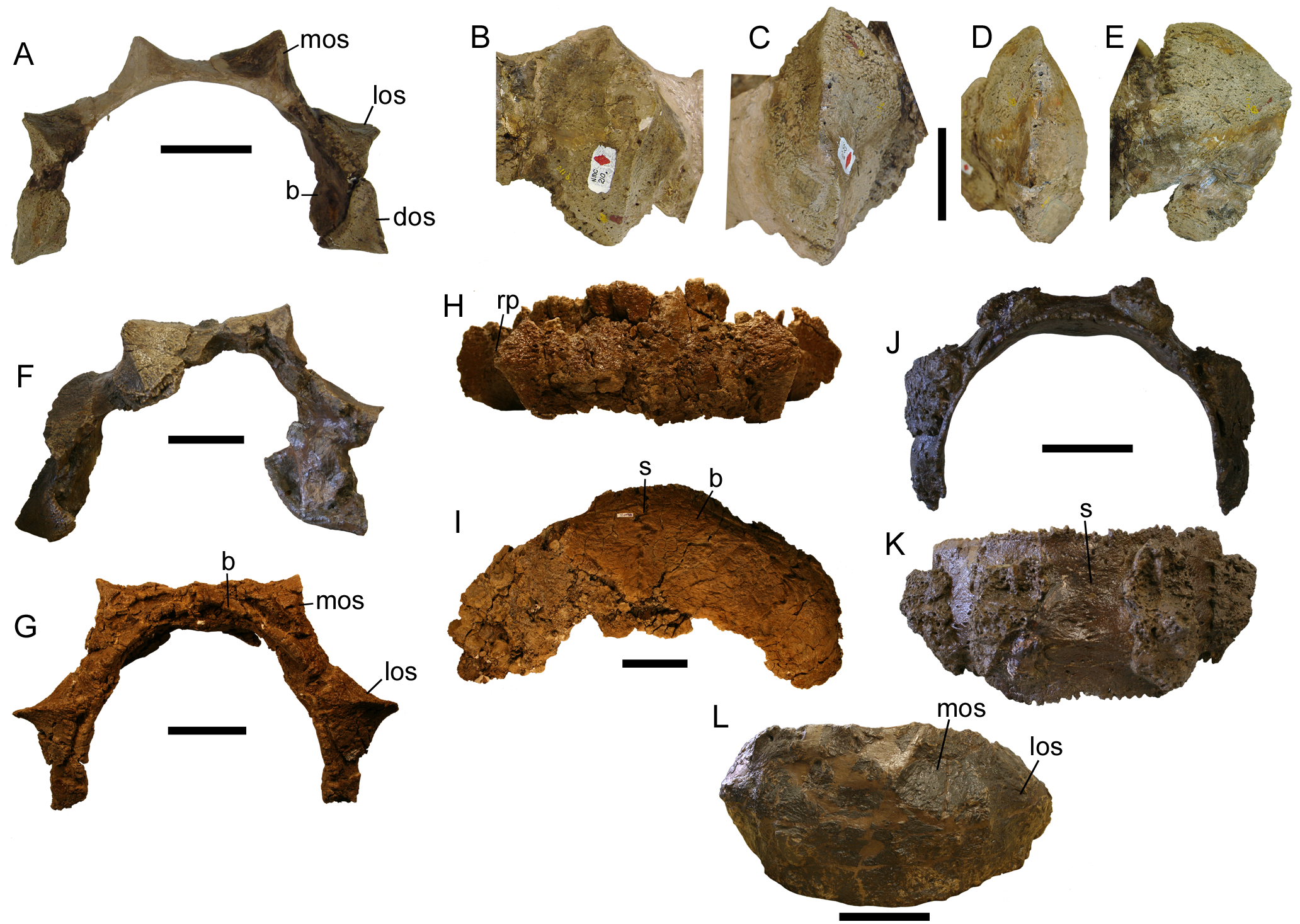
Cervical half rings and osteoderms

The head and body of Euoplocephalus were covered with bony armor, except for parts of the limbs and possibly the distal tail. The armor consisted of osteoderms, skin ossifications that are not part of the skeleton proper. This armor was in 1982 extensively described by Kenneth Carpenter, who however, largely based himself on the very complete specimen NHMUK R5161, the holotype of Scolosaurus, which genus no longer is seen as a synonym of Euoplocephalus. When limited to the certain material of the latter genus, little is known of the exact configuration of the armor, with the exception of the head and the neck. The most informative specimen in this respect would then be ROM 1930, having conserved some osteoderms of the torso in their original position.

In any case, much of the armor was made up of small ossicles, bony round scutes with a diameter of less than five millimetres, of which often hundreds have been found with a single specimen. If the armor was configured in an identical way to that of Scolosaurus, many of these small ossicles had fused into a kind of pavement, forming transverse bands on the body. The banded arrangement is thought to have permitted some freedom of movement. Four of these bands might have been present on the anterior half of the tail, three on the pelvis, perhaps fused into a single "sacral shield", and four across the front part of the torso. Inset in these bands were horizontal rows of larger oval, flat or keeled, scutes. Types of large scutes varied by body region. It might be that the scutes on the shoulder, near the midline of the body, were largest and tallest; ROM 1930 includes some osteoderms with a base length of fifteen centimeters. Little is known about the armor of the limbs. Large keeled plates were present on the upper arms as shown by specimen TMP 1997.132.01 conserving a round osteoderm near the humerus with a diameter of twenty centimeters and narrower spikes associated with the lower arm. The neck was protected by two bone rings, open at the underside, that are called "cervical half-rings". Earlier seen as a fusion of osteoderms, this was doubted by Arbour et al. in 2013, who pointed out that they formed a lower layer, possibly consisting of ossified cartilage, as indicated by a smooth surface and a woven bone texture. Each half-ring is constructed out of six rectangular concave plates, three per side. Each plate has a large keeled osteoderm on top, often not fused with it. With Euoplocephalus, these neck osteoderms do not have smaller osteoderms at their bases, and their keels do not overhang their posterior edges.

The armor of the skull consists of a large number of ossicles, called caputegulae ("head tiles"), that have fused with the normal skull elements, largely fading their sutures. On the snout they form a chaotic and asymmetric mosaic. On the rear nasal region, at the midline a single hexagonal larger plate is present. A keeled plate per side, somewhat more to the back forms the snout rim. Behind the level of the eye sockets the caputegulae fuse into a single bone surface. The upper rim of the eye sockets is formed by two pyramid-shaped osteoderms pointing to the sides and rear. In addition, Euoplocephalus had two pyramid-shaped squamosal "horns" growing from the back corners of its head. Between them the nuchal crest is covered by two osteoderms per side. At the lower rear side of the skull, a quadratojugal horn is present, in the form of an enormous tongue-shaped osteoderm projecting below.

== Discovery and species ==
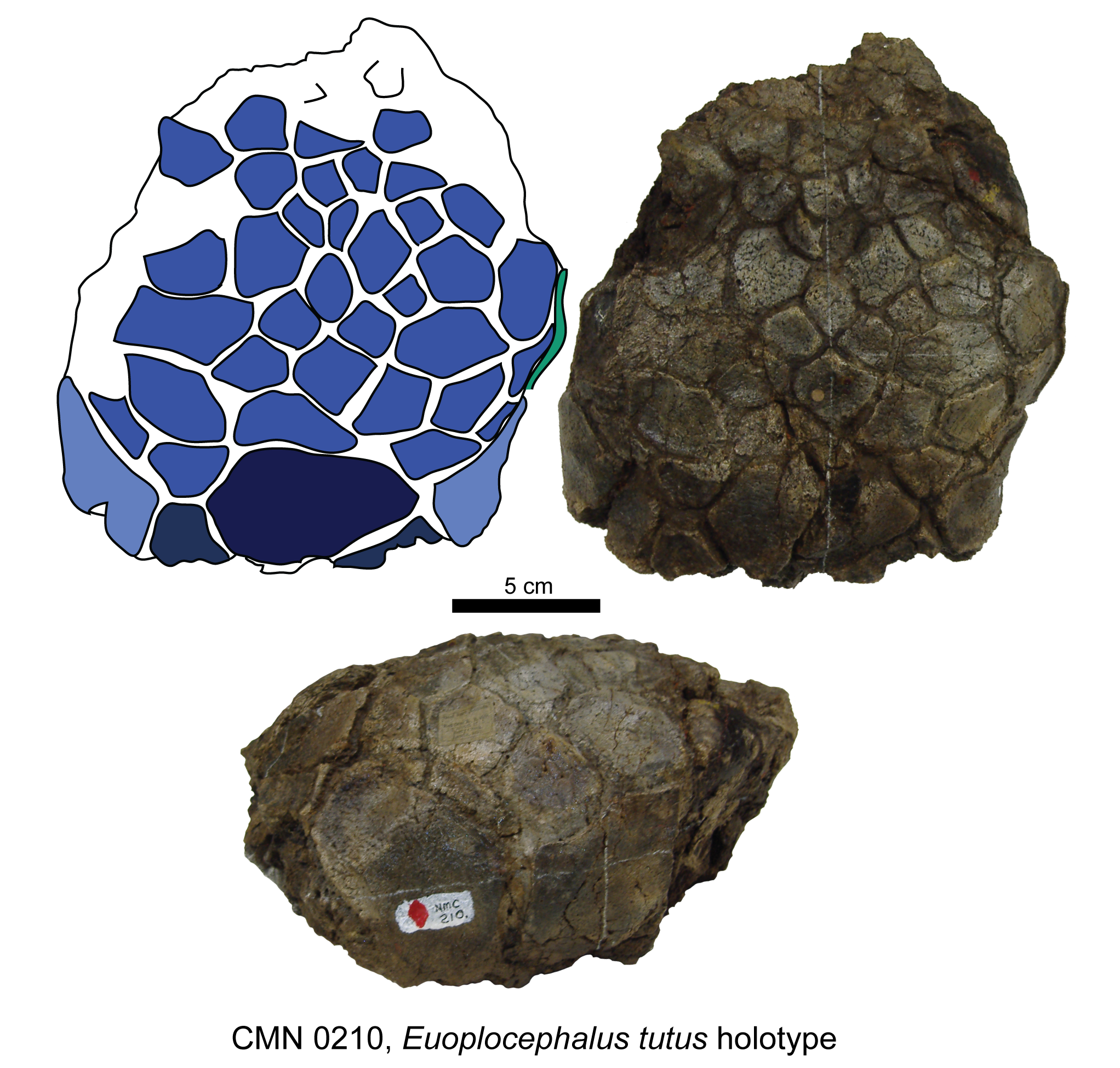
Skull of the holotype CMN 0210

Canadian paleontologist Lawrence Morris Lambe discovered the first specimen on 18 August 1897 in the area of the present Dinosaur Provincial Park, in the valley of the Red Deer River, Alberta, Canada. In 1902, this fossil, CMN 210 (also NMC 210) was designated as the holotype specimen of the type species Stereocephalus tutus. This specimen consists of the upper part of a cranium and a transverse series of five scutes that were part of a cervical half ring. The generic name was derived from Greek στερεός, stereos, "solid", and κεφαλή, kephalè, "head", which refers to the formidable armour. However, the genus name was already preoccupied — the name had already been given to an insect, the beetle Stereocephalus Lynch 1884 — so Lambe changed it to Euoplocephalus in 1910, with as combinatio nova (new combination name) Euoplocephalus tutus. The type species remains Stereocephalus tutus. In 1915, Edwin Hennig classified E. tutus under the genus Palaeoscincus Leidy 1856, coining Palaeoscincus tutus. Today however, Palaeoscincus is considered to be a nomen dubium based on indeterminate ankylosaurian teeth. In 1964, Euoplocephalus was by Oskar Kuhn referred to Ankylosaurus, as a Ankylosaurus tutus.

The genus name Euoplocephalus, meaning "well-armed head", is derived from the Greek words eu (εὖ) meaning "well", hoplo~ (ὁπλο~) meaning "armed", and kephale (κεφαλή) meaning "head". This name has been misspelled more than a dozen different ways in formal scientific literature. The specific name tutus means "safely protected" in Latin. The only valid species known today is Euoplocephalus tutus.

=== Referred material ===
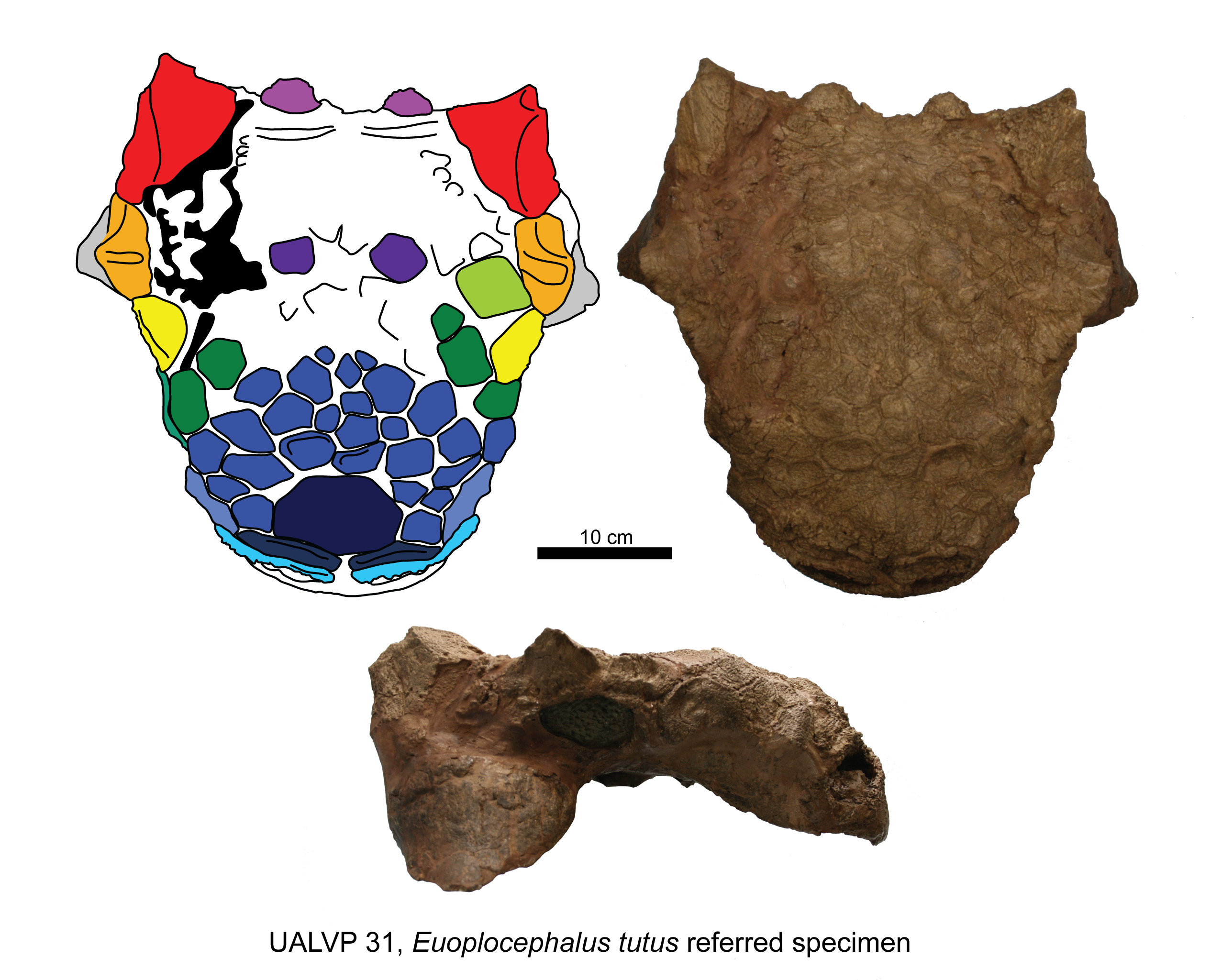
Skull of specimen UALVP 31

During the early twentieth century many more ankylosaurid fossils were uncovered in North America. Some were referred to Euoplocephalus, others named as separate genera. In 1971 however, Walter Coombs submitted a dissertation containing a landmark re-appraisal of North American ankylosaurs. He noted that, among the many specimens similar to Euoplocephalus, their skulls varied so much that either every known specimen must be a new species, or they all represented individual variation within a single species: Euoplocephalus tutus. Starting from this assumption that there was only one species of ankylosaur during the Campanian stage of the Upper Cretaceous, Coombs synonymized the genera Anodontosaurus, Dyoplosaurus, and Scolosaurus with Euoplocephalus and the species A. lambei, D. acutosquameus, and S. cutleri with E. tutus, creating a species that spanned nearly ten million years, or the entire Campanian. The fossils now referred to this species contained more than forty individuals discovered in Alberta, Canada and Montana in the United States, which would have made Euoplocephalus the best known ankylosaurid. This included fifteen skulls, teeth, and a few almost-complete skeletons, found with the armor still attached. Individual armor plates are the most commonly found element from them. In 1978, Coombs even included the Asian ankylosaurid Tarchia in the genus, renaming it as Euoplocephalus giganteus.

The synonymy of all Campanian North-American ankylosaurids was followed for several decades, until scientists from the University of Alberta began to re-examine the fossils. A 2009 study found that Dyoplosaurus is in fact a valid taxon, and identified unique characteristics that differentiated it from Euoplocephalus, including its triangular claws. Victoria Arbour (2010) argued that Anodontosaurus (known from the Horseshoe Canyon Formation) is distinct from Euoplocephalus and is also a valid taxon; according to Arbour, Anodontosaurus differs from Euoplocephalus in distinctive skull and cervical half ring ornamentation, as well as tail club morphology, including the presence of pointed, triangular knob osteoderms in Anodontosaurus. Furthermore, Arbour (2010) suggested to reassign all Horseshoe Canyon Formation ankylosaurine specimens from Euoplocephalus to Anodontosaurus. The validity of Anodontosaurus was accepted in two subsequent studies. The first, published by Paul Penkalski and William T. Blows in 2013, re-validated Scolosaurus as well. The second study, by Penkalski (2013), named and described Oohkotokia from Montana on the basis of remains that were originally thought to be referable to Euoplocephalus.

Palaeoscincus asper, "the rough one", is now considered to be Euoplocephalus. It is a dubious tooth taxon from the late Campanian Dinosaur Park Formation of Alberta, named by Lambe in 1902. It consists of a single tooth, specimen NMC 1349.

In 2013 Arbour limited the specimens that could be reliably referred to Euoplocephalus to the lowest thirty metres of the Dinosaur Park Formation. The material would in that case, apart from the holotype, consist of partial skeletons with skull AMNH 5337, AMNH 5403, AMNH 5404, AMNH 5405, ROM 1930 and UALVP 31; partial skeleton lacking the skull AMNH 5406; CMN 842, a cervical half-ring; CMN 8876, a skull, TMP 1979.14.74, a fragmentary skull; and UALVP 47977, a skull roof piece. The hands, feet and tail, including the club, are therefore not completely known. However, many of those specimens have now been reassigned to other, new taxa, including Scolosaurus and Platypelta, and others.

== Classification ==
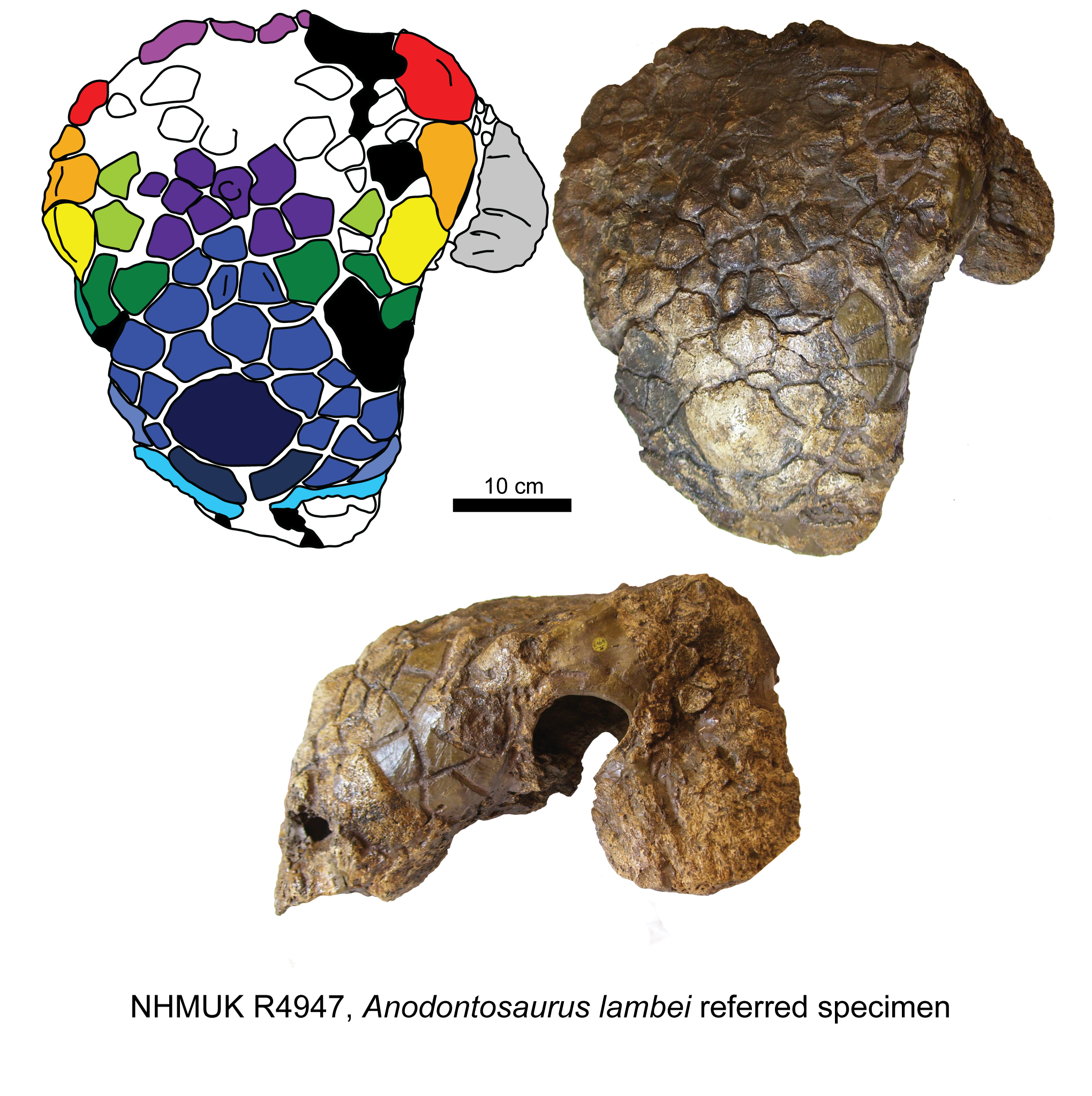
Referred skull NHMUK R4947

In 1910, Lambe assigned Euoplocephalus to the Stegosauria, a group then encompassing all armoured dinosaur forms and thus having a much wider range than the present concept. In 1917, Charles Whitney Gilmore assigned it to the Ankylosauridae. Today, Euoplocephalus is still seen as an ankylosaurid, but as a member of the Ankylosauria, not the Stegosauria. It is likely also a member of the derived subgroup Ankylosaurinae. The recent splitting of the ankylosaurid Campanian material of North America has complicated the issue of the direct affinities of Euoplocephalus. Penkalski (2013) performed a small phylogenetic analysis of some ankylosaurine specimens. The only Anodontosaurus specimen that was included in this analysis was its holotype. Anodontosaurus was placed in a polytomy with the holotype of Euoplocephalus and some specimens that are referred to it, while Oohkotokia was placed in a clade with Dyoplosaurus, and specimens that are thought to represent either Dyoplosaurus or Scolosaurus.

The following cladogram is based on a 2015 phylogenetic analysis of the Ankylosaurinae conducted by Arbour and Currie:

- Ankylosaurinae
  - Crichtonpelta
  - - Tsagantegia
    - Zhejiangosaurus
    - Pinacosaurus
    - - - Saichania
        - - Tarchia
          - Zaraapelta
      - Ankylosaurini
        - Dyoplosaurus
        - - - Talarurus
            - Nodocephalosaurus
          - - - Ankylosaurus
              - Anodontosaurus
            - Euoplocephalus
            - - Scolosaurus
              - Ziapelta

The results of an earlier analysis of the ankylosaurid tree by Thompson et al. (2011), is shown by this cladogram.

- Ankylosauridae
  - Minmi
  - - Liaoningosaurus
    - - Cedarpelta
      - - Gobisaurus
        - - Shamosaurus
          - Ankylosaurinae
            - Tsagantegia
            - Zhongyuansaurus
            - - - Shanxia
                - - Crichtonsaurus
                  - - Dyoplosaurus
                    - Pinacosaurus mephistocephalus
              - - - Ankylosaurus
                  - Euoplocephalus
                - - - Minotaurasaurus
                    - Pinacosaurus
                  - - Nodocephalosaurus
                    - - - Talarurus
                        - Tianzhenosaurus
                      - - Tarchia
                        - Saichania

== Paleoecology ==
Euoplocephalus, following the synonymizations proposed by Coombs (1971), was thought to exist for far longer, and was a member of more distinct faunas, than any of its contemporaries, as these fossils dated to between 76.5 and 67 million years ago in the Campanian-Maastrichtian ages of the late Cretaceous period, and came from the Dinosaur Park and Horseshoe Canyon Formations of Alberta, Two Medicine Formation of Montana, and possibly from the Oldman Formation of Alberta. Fossils that were initially believed to be from the Judith River Formation of Montana are actually from the Dinosaur Park Formation. However, recent studies referred all Horseshoe Canyon Formation specimens to Anodontosaurus, and all Two Medicine Formation specimens to Oohkotokia. A specimen from the lowermost Dinosaur Park, or possibly from the underlying Oldman Formation, was reassigned back to Scolosaurus. Although the stratigraphic range of the holotype of Euoplocephalus is uncertain, all specimens that can be reliably referred to E. tutus came from the lower 40 m and the upper >10 m of the Dinosaur Park Formation. There are no known ankylosaurids from the top 20–25 m of the Formation. Thus, all Euoplocephalus specimens date to between 76.4 (or less) and 75.6 million years ago, in the late Campanian stage.

== Paleobiology ==
According to Coombs, Euoplocephalus may have had cursorial abilities on par with those of the modern rhinoceros and hippopotamus. Based on the form of the humerus-shoulder articulation and the arrangement of the protracting muscles of the upper arm, it appears that the upper arm sloped away from the body. Coombs and Maryanska (1990) observed that Euoplocephalus specimens are usually discovered as isolated elements or partial skeletons, which suggested that this animal engaged in solitary habits and was usually either solitary or participated in small group clusters.

The armor of Euoplocephalus may have had a keratinous covering, or it may have floated in the skin, as is seen in modern crocodiles. In addition to protection, the heavily vascularized armor may have had a role in thermoregulation. The palpebral bones over the eyes may have provided additional protection for the eyes. Such bones with Euoplocephalus have been discovered in the upper part of the eye socket, instead of in front of the upper socket rim which is the more common position. Coombs explained this by assuming that these bones were located in the eyelid musculature and were probably mobile enough to be moved over the eyes.

=== Defense ===
The tail club of ankylosaurids has often been interpreted as a defensive weapon. In Euoplocephalus, the presence of ossified tendons only with the distal half of the tail may support such a function. Because only the distal half of the tail was stiffened by tendons, the anterior half could still move freely from side to side. The ossified tendons would have transmitted the force of the swing to the club and reinforced the supporting vertebrae. The club was likely held just above the ground, as there was not sufficient musculature to raise the tail very high. A 2009 study concluded that "large ankylosaurian clubs could generate sufficient force to break bone during impacts, while average and small ones could not". It has also concluded that "tail swinging behavior is feasible in ankylosaurids, but it remains unknown whether the tail was used for interspecific defense, intraspecific combat, or both". The tail club could be swung low, toward the fragile metatarsals or shin bones of attacking theropods.

=== Senses and airflow ===
Euoplocephalus had relatively small eyes, but this does not necessarily mean that it had restricted vision. The complex respiratory passages observed in the skull suggest that Euoplocephalus had a good sense of smell, although in 1978 an examination of casts of the endocranium did not show an enlarged olfactory region of the brain. Teresa Maryanska, who has worked extensively on Mongolian ankylosaurids, suggested that the respiratory passages were primarily used to perform a mammal-like treatment of inhaled air, based on the presence and arrangement of specialized bones, which are present in Euoplocephalus.

A 2011 study found that the nasal passages of Euoplocephalus were looped and complex; possibly an adaptation for heat and water balance and vocal resonance, and researchers discovered an enlarged and vascularised chamber at the back of the nasal tract, which was considered by the authors to be an adaptation to improve its sense of smell. The researchers also managed to reconstruct the dinosaur's inner ear and concluded that it was capable of hearing at low frequencies. They suggested that this may have been an adaption to hearing low-toned resonant sounds produced by the nasal passages.

=== Diet ===
Euoplocephalus, like other ankylosaurians, is thought to have been a herbivore. It had a broad muzzle, which could indicate that it was a non-selective feeder, perhaps similar to a hippopotamus. This would provide niche separation from contemporaneous nodosaurids with narrower muzzles. Ankylosaurians have historically been thought of as feeding using simple up-and-down movements of the jaws. Georg Haas (1969) examined the evidence for the jaw muscles of two skulls (AMNH 5337 and 5405) and concluded that despite the large size of the skulls the associated musculature was relatively weak. He also thought jaw movement was largely orthogonal, in the vertical plane only. Haas extrapolated from this that dinosaurs like Euoplocephalus likely ate relatively soft non-abrasive vegetation.

However, later research indicated that forward and sideways jaw movement was possible, the skull being able to withstand considerable forces. Euoplocephalus appears to have been able to make more complex movements. Tooth wear and jaw articulations (within the lower jaw and at the lower jaw-quadrate joint) suggest that the lower jaws were pulled back during feeding, and also slightly pivoted inward. This action would have sheared food. A study conducted in 2014 found that the ankylosaurs were capable of eating of tough fibrous plant material, though not to the same degree as their nodosaur relatives or the ceratopsians and hadrosaurs.

== See also ==
- Timeline of ankylosaur research
