= Coppola =

Coppola most commonly refers to:

- Coppola (surname), people with the surname Coppola
  - Coppola family, Italian-American film family
- Coppola (cap), a traditional flat cap worn by men in Sicily

== Characters ==
- Coppola, a character from "Der Sandmann", a short story by E. T. A. Hoffmann
- Ana Coppola, a character from Ichigo Mashimaro

== Places ==
- Villaggio Coppola, an Italian hamlet of Castel Volturno municipality

== Companies ==
- Coppola Industria Alimentare, an Italian food processing company
- Coppola Foods, an Italian family owned food company

== See also ==
- Cupola (disambiguation)
