= F. Jay Barrows =

American politician

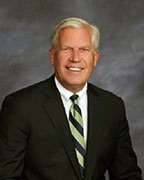

Member of the Massachusetts House of Representatives from the 1st Bristol district
- In office 2007–2025
- Preceded by: Ginny Coppola
- Succeeded by: Michael Chaisson

Personal details
- Born: Attleboro, Massachusetts, U.S.
- Party: Republican

Fred Jay Barrows (born April 5, 1956) was a member of the Massachusetts House of Representatives from the 1st Bristol district. Barrows represented the district from 2007 to 2025.

== Electoral history ==
2022 1st Bristol General Election
| Party | Candidate | Votes | % |
|---|---|---|---|
| Republican | F. Jay Barrows | 8,036 | 67.2 |
| Democratic | Brendan Roche | 3,927 | 33.8 |
| Total votes | | 11,963 | 100.0 |

2020 1st Bristol General Election
| Party | Candidate | Votes | % |
|---|---|---|---|
| Republican | F. Jay Barrows | 13,092 | 56.0 |
| Democratic | Brendan Roche | 10,268 | 43.9 |
| Total votes | | 23,360 | 100.0 |

2018 1st Bristol General Election
| Party | Candidate | Votes | % |
|---|---|---|---|
| Republican | F. Jay Barrows | 13,820 | 99.4 |
| Write-in | | 90 | 0.6 |
| Total votes | | 13,910 | 100.0 |

2016 1st Bristol General Election
| Party | Candidate | Votes | % |
|---|---|---|---|
| Republican | F. Jay Barrows | 12,561 | 60.04 |
| Democratic | Michael E. Toole | 8,361 | 39.96 |
| Total votes | | 20,922 | 100.0 |

== See also ==
- 2019–2020 Massachusetts legislature
- 2021–2022 Massachusetts legislature
