= Cox Macro =

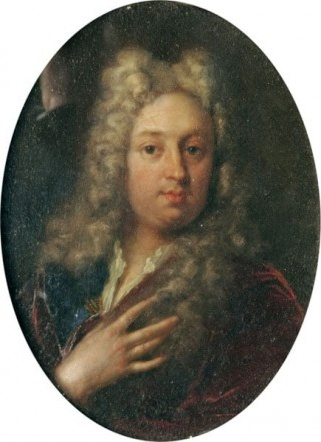
Portrait by Frans van Mieris the Younger, in Norwich Castle

Cox Macro (1686 – 2 February 1767) was an Anglican priest, and antiquarian. He accumulated a large collection of antiquities at his home, Little Haugh Hall near Norton, Suffolk.

== Family background ==
Macro was the eldest son of Thomas Macro, grocer, alderman, and five times chief magistrate of Bury St Edmunds (died 26 May 1737, aged 88). Thomas Macro lived and made his fortune in the ancient house in the Meat Market in Bury, usually known, from the observatory on its top, as Cupola House, and he purchased the estate of Little Haugh, in the neighbouring parish of Norton, for his country house. He married, on 9 January 1678-9, Susan, the only daughter and heiress of the Rev. John Cox, rector of Risby, near Bury, and great-granddaughter of Dr Richard Cox, bishop of Ely. She died on 29 April 1743. The son, Cox Macro, was born in 1683, and received his baptismal name from his mother's surname.

== Life ==
Cox Macro was educated at Bury grammar school by the Rev. Edward Leeds. He matriculated at Jesus College, Cambridge, but migrated to Christ's College, Cambridge in January 1701-2, in order, as the Latin entry in the books says, to enjoy better health (mutato cœlo), and to study medicine. In September 1703 he entered at Leyden University, where he studied under Herman Boerhaave. He proceeded LL.B. at Cambridge in 1710, D.D. in 1717, and he was at the time of his death the senior doctor in divinity of the university.

Richard Hurd was curate during 1742-3 of a parish near Norton, where he often saw Macro, and considered him "a very learned and amiable man, the most complete scholar and gentleman united that almost ever I saw." The doctor was "master of most of the modern languages"; and he taught Hurd Italian. There was correspondence between Hurd and the family for many years. Macro had moved into Little Haugh Hall by 1719. It contained many valuable paintings, a few pieces of sculpture, a collection of coins and medals, numerous manuscripts, and a library of books rich in old poetry and other rare works. Peter Tillemans of Antwerp, a friend of the family since about 1715, created decorative work in the house and produced about twenty paintings, some original and others in the manner of other artists. Tillemans died at Little Haugh in 1734, and was buried in the churchyard of Stowlangtoft; Macro soon afterwards commissioned a bust of Tillemans by John Michael Rysbrack, and one of Rysbrach himself.

== Family ==
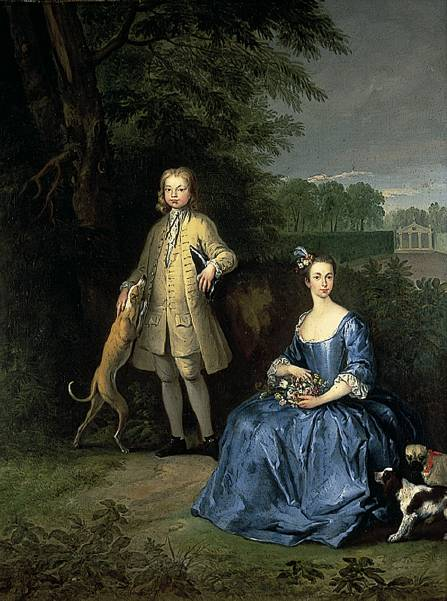
Portrait of Master Edward and Miss Mary Macro, the children of Revd Dr Cox Macro, by Peter Tillemans

Macro died at Little Haugh on 2 February 1767, and was buried on 9 February in Norton churchyard, in an enclosure between the side of the vestry and a buttress to the church wall. His wife was Mary, daughter of Edward Godfrey, privy purse to Queen Anne. She died on 31 August 1753, and was buried at Norton, leaving one son and one daughter. The former, for some time at Emmanuel College, Cambridge, with Hurd as his tutor, became a soldier, and died abroad during his father's lifetime, whereupon his sister, Mary, became her father's heiress. After his death — for he would not allow the union previously — she married, on 8 May 1767, William Staniforth of Sheffield, and died without issue on 16 August 1775.

== His estate ==
Macro left a charitable bequest of £600 to Norton parish, to provide twelve coats for poor men and twelve gowns for poor women. A catalogue of Macro's treasures was compiled in 1766. Among them were drawings by the old masters, which had belonged to Sir James Thornhill, many letters from protestant martyrs, descended to him through Bishop Cox, the great register of Bury St Edmunds Abbey, a ledger-book of Glastonbury Abbey, the original manuscript of Edmund Spenser's A View of the Present State of Irelande all the collections of John Covel, and numerous charters.

Many of his manuscripts had belonged to Sir Henry Spelman, others formed part of the library of Bury St Edmunds Abbey, and several of them had been obtained through Hurd. A part of Macro's literary collections were presented by the Staniforths to Mr. Wilson, a Yorkshire antiquary, who was his nephew; and when the Wilson library was dispersed in 1844 they went to augment the store of Sir Thomas Phillipps at Middle Hill. The Macro property ultimately came to John Patteson, M.P. for Norwich, who disposed of the old masters by auction in 1819, and sold the books and manuscripts for a trifling sum — no more than £150, it is said — to Richard Beatniffe, bookseller in that city, who resold them at a very large profit. The manuscripts were sold for him by Christie of Pall Mall in 1820, and were purchased — forty-one lots by Dawson Turner and the rest by Hudson Gurney — for £700.
