= Lagena (anatomy) =

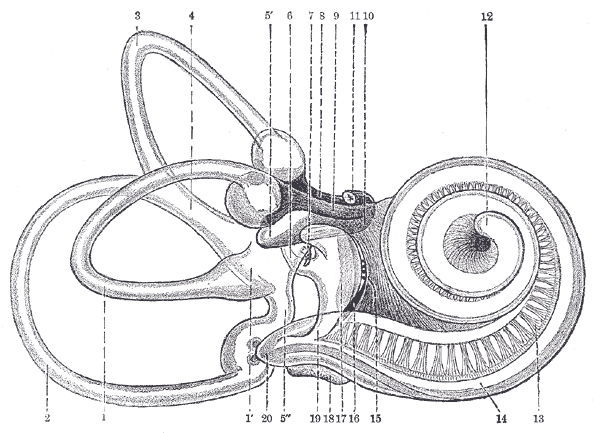
- Lagena is #12, and is labeled at upper right.

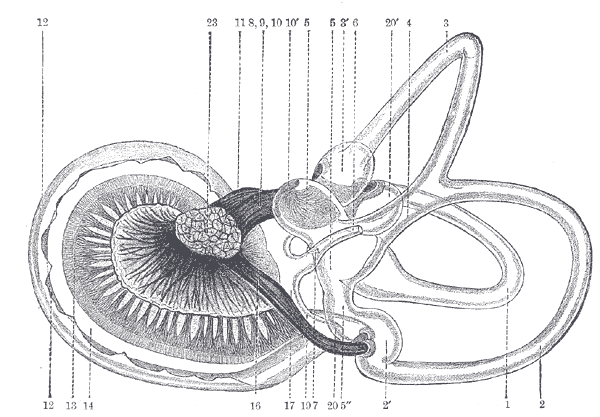
- Lagena is #12, and is labeled at upper left and lower left.

The lagena (from Greek λάγηνος lágēnos 'flask') is a structure found in humans and in other animals.

== In human anatomy ==
In the ear, the extremities of the ductus cochlearis are closed; the upper is termed the lagena and is attached to the cupula at the upper part of the helicotrema; the lower is lodged in the recessus cochlearis of the vestibule.

== In fish and amphibians ==
The lagena is part of the vestibular system in fish and amphibians. It contains the otoliths asterisci. In fish, the lagena is implicated in hearing and the registration of vertical linear acceleration, in amphibians is the latter only.
