= Richard Beatniffe =

English bookseller and author

- Born: 1739
- Died: 1818 (aged 78–79)
- Occupations: Printer, Bookseller and author

Richard Beatniffe (1740–1818) was an English printer, bookseller and the author of The Norfolk Tour guide book.

== Early life ==
Beatniffe was born in 1739 in Louth, Lincolnshire, and was adopted and educated by his uncle, the Rev. Samuel Beatniffe, rector of Gaywood and Bawsey in Norfolk. He was apprenticed to a bookseller at Lynn of the name of Thomas Hollingworth, who was in the habit of taking four apprentices. When we are told that all the four were expected to sleep in one bed, that the sheets were changed only once a year, and that the youths were dieted in the most economical manner, it says much for the sturdiness of Beatniffe that he was the only apprentice Hollingworth had for forty years who remained to serve his full-time. The temptations of the hand of his master's daughter, who was deformed in person and unpleasing in manners, together with a share in the business, were not able to retain Beatniffe in Lynn. Upon the termination of his apprenticeship, he went to Norwich, where he became a freeman of Norwich by purchase on 21 September 1764 as a bookbinder. His old master Hollingworth, if harsh, must have been also generous, since he had advanced Beatniffe £500, in 1763 to purchase the stock of the bankrupt Jonathan Gleed, a bookseller of London Lane, in Norwich.

== Bookselling ==
Beatniffe became a successful bookseller in Norwich. His knowledge of books, skill as a bookbinder, and business habits, made him a prosperous tradesman. For many years he owned the best collection of old books among provincial dealers, and was long the first secondhand bookseller in Norwich. His first catalogue was printed in 1779, and his last in 1808; they contained many rare volumes, which he knew how to price at their full value. Among the libraries purchased by him was that of the Rev. Dr. Cox Macro, of Little Haugh in Suffolk, who died in 1767, after having brought together a rich treasure of early-printed books, old poetry, original letters, and autographs. The library remained unexamined for forty years, when it came into Beatniffe's hands at the commencement of the century for the small sum of £150 or £160. On being sold piecemeal the collection realised nine or ten times as much.

William Beloe, who knew him, has described Beatniffe as

a shrewd, cold, inflexible fellow, who traded principally in old books, and held out but little encouragement to a youth who rarely had money to expend. ... The principal feature of this man's character was suspicion of strangers, and a constant apprehension lest he should dispose of any of his libri rarissimi to some cunning wight or professed collector. If any customer was announced as coming from the metropolis, he immediately added at least one-third to his price.

== Printing ==
In 1766 "having engaged proper assistance from London and purchased a large quantity of Mr Caslon's excellent type", Beatniffe opened a printing office in the parish of St Peter Permountergate (Norwich Mercury 21 June 1766). where he was responsible for printing many substantial works. However, in 1795 he took John Payne as a partner in his printing business and retired from it in 1798.

== Publishing ==
In 1772 Beatniffe produced the first edition of his excellent little Norfolk Tour, or Traveller's Pocket Companion, being a concise description of all the noblemen's and gentlemen's seats, as well as of the principal towns and other remarkable places in the county. A second edition appeared in 1773, the third in 1777, the fourth in 1786, the fifth in 1795, with the sixth and last in 1808, "greatly enlarged and improved". This edition was 399 pages, about four times the size of the first. In the advertisement the author states that he had carefully revised every page, "and by the friendly communications of several gentlemen in the county and [his] own observations during the last ten years greatly enlarged" it. Improvements and additions were made by the author to each successive edition, and most of the places described were personally visited. It is written in a plain manner, and is full of information. Mr. W. Rye says:

The numerous editions to which it ran show it had considerable merit, and in its notes and illustrations there is much useful and interesting reading.

== Character ==
His biographer tells some characteristic anecdotes of the bookseller's unyielding toryism, of his rebuffs to chaffering customers, and of his unwillingness to supply the London trade. He preferred to sell to private buyers, and indeed was often loth to part with his "jewels", as he styled his rarities.

Having amassed a considerable fortune, Beatniffe retired from his bookselling business a short time before his death, which took place 9 July 1818, age seventy-nine, at Norwich. He was buried in the nave of the Norwich church of St. Peter at Mancroft.

== Family ==
Beatniffe married Martha Dinah Hart, who died in 1816, daughter of a writing-master and alderman of Bury St. Edmund's, by whom he had a son and a daughter. A James Samuel Beatniffe was apprenticed to Richard Beatniffe, bookseller in 1785.(Society of Genealogists, Lists of Masters and Apprentices.)
