= Copulas in signal processing =

A copula is a mathematical function that provides a relationship between marginal distributions of random variables and their joint distributions. Copulas are important because it represents a dependence structure without using marginal distributions. Copulas have been widely used in the field of finance, but their use in signal processing is relatively new. Copulas have been employed in the field of Wireless communication for classifying radar signals, change detection in remote sensing applications, and EEG signal processing in medicine. In this article, a short introduction to copulas is presented, followed by a mathematical derivation to obtain copula density functions, and then a section with a list of copula density functions with applications in signal processing.

== Introduction ==
Using Sklar's theorem, a copula can be described as a cumulative distribution function (CDF) on a unit-space with uniform marginal distributions on the interval (0, 1). The CDF of a random variable X is the probability that X will take a value less than or equal to x when evaluated at x itself. A copula can represent a dependence structure without using marginal distributions. Therefore, it is simple to transform the uniformly distributed variables of copula (u, v, and so on) into the marginal variables (x, y, and so on) by the inverse marginal cumulative distribution function. Using the chain rule, copula distribution function can be partially differentiated with respect to the uniformly distributed variables of copula, and it is possible to express the multivariate probability density function (PDF) as a product of a multivariate copula density function and marginal PDF''s. The mathematics for converting a copula distribution function into a copula density function is shown for a bivariate case, and a family of copulas used in signal processing are listed in a TABLE 1.

== Mathematical derivation ==
For any two random variables X and Y, the continuous joint probability distribution function can be written as

$$F_{XY}(x,y) = \Pr \begin{Bmatrix} X \leq{x},Y\leq{y} \end{Bmatrix},$$

where $F_X(x) = \Pr \begin{Bmatrix} X \leq{x} \end{Bmatrix}$ and $F_Y(y) = \Pr \begin{Bmatrix} Y \leq{y} \end{Bmatrix}$ are the marginal cumulative distribution functions of the random variables X and Y, respectively.

then the copula distribution function $C(u, v)$ can be defined using Sklar's theorem as:

$F_{XY}(x,y) = C( F_X (x) , F_Y (y) ) \triangleq C( u, v )$,

where $u = F_X(x)$ and $v = F_Y(y)$ are marginal distribution functions, $F_{XY}(x,y)$ joint and $u, v \in (0,1)$.

We start by using the relationship between joint probability density function (PDF) and joint cumulative distribution function (CDF) and its partial derivatives.

$$\begin{alignat}{6}
f_{XY}(x,y) = {} & {\partial^2 F_{XY}(x,y) \over\partial x\,\partial y }  \\
\vdots \\
f_{XY}(x,y) = {} & {\partial^2 C(F_X(x),F_Y(y)) \over\partial x\,\partial y} \\
\vdots \\
f_{XY}(x,y) = {} & {\partial^2 C(u,v) \over\partial u\,\partial v} \cdot {\partial F_X(x) \over\partial x} \cdot {\partial F_Y(y) \over\partial y} \\
\vdots \\
f_{XY}(x,y) = {} & c(u,v) f_X(x) f_Y(y)  \\
\vdots \\
\frac{f_{XY}(x,y)}{f_X(x) f_Y(y) } = {} & c(u,v)
\end{alignat}$$
(Equation 1)

where $c(u,v)$ is the copula density function, $f_X(x)$ and $f_Y(y)$ are the marginal probability density functions of X and Y, respectively. It is important understand that there are four elements in the equation 1, and if three of the four are known, the fourth element can be calculated. For example, equation 1 may be used

- when joint probability density function between two random variables is known, the copula density function is known, and one of the two marginal functions are known, then, the other marginal function can be calculated, or
- when the two marginal functions and the copula density function are known, then the joint probability density function between the two random variables can be calculated, or
- when the two marginal functions and the joint probability density function between the two random variables are known, then the copula density function can be calculated.

== Summary table ==
The use of copula in signal processing is fairly new compared to finance. Here, a family of new bivariate copula density functions are listed with importance in the area of signal processing. Here, $u=F_X(x)$ and $v=F_Y(y)$ are marginal distributions functions and $f_X(x)$ and $f_Y(y)$ are marginal density functions

	Coupla density: c(u, v)	Use
Gaussian	$$\begin{align} = {} & \frac{1}{\sqrt{1-\rho^2}} \exp\left (-\frac{(a^2+b^2)\rho^2-2 ab\rho}{ 2(1-\rho^2) } \right ) \\ & \text{where } \rho\in (-1,1)\\ & \text{where } a=\sqrt{2} \operatorname{erf}^{-1}({2u-1}) \\ & \text{where } b =\sqrt{2}\operatorname{erf}^{-1}({2v-1}) \\ & \text{where } \operatorname{erf}(z) = \frac{2}{\sqrt{\pi}} \int\limits_0^z \exp (-t^2) \, dt \end{align}$$	supervised classification of synthetic aperture radar (SAR) images, validating biometric authentication, modeling stochastic dependence in large-scale integration of wind power, unsupervised classification of radar signals
Exponential	$$\begin{align} = {} & \frac{1}{1-\rho} \exp\left ( \frac{\rho(\ln(1-u)+\ln(1-v))}{1-\rho} \right ) \cdot I_0\left ( \frac{2\sqrt{\rho \ln(1-u)\ln(1-v)}}{1-\rho}   \right )\\ & \text{where } x=F_X^{-1}(u)=-\ln(1-u)/\lambda \\ & \text{where } y=F_Y^{-1}(v)=-\ln(1-v)/\mu \end{align}$$	queuing system with infinitely servers
Rayleigh	bivariate exponential, Rayleigh, and Weibull copulas have been proved to be equivalent	change detection from SAR images
Weibull	bivariate exponential, Rayleigh, and Weibull copulas have been proved to be equivalent	digital communication over fading channels
Log-normal	bivariate log-normal copula and Gaussian copula are equivalent	shadow fading along with multipath effect in wireless channel
Farlie–Gumbel–Morgenstern (FGM)	$$\begin{align} = {} & 1+\theta(1-2u)(1-2v) \\ & \text{where } \theta \in[-1,1] \end{align}$$	information processing of uncertainty in knowledge-based systems
Clayton	$$\begin{align} = {} & (1+\theta)u^{(-1-\theta)}(-1 +u^{-\theta} + v^{-\theta})^{(-2-1/\theta)} \\ & \text{where } \theta \in(-1,\infty), \theta\neq0 \end{align}$$	location estimation of random signal source and hypothesis testing using heterogeneous data
Frank	$$\begin{align} = {} & \frac {\theta e^{\theta(1+u+v)(e^{\theta}-1)}} {(e^\theta-e^{\theta(1+u)}-e^{\theta(1+v)}+e^{\theta(u+v)})^2}\\ & \text{where } \theta \in(-\infty,+\infty), \theta\neq0 \end{align}$$	change detection in remote sensing applications
Student's t	$$\begin{align} = {} & \frac{\Gamma(0.5v)\Gamma(0.5v+1)( 1+(t_v^{-2}(u)+t_v^{-2}(v) -2 \rho t_v^{-1}(u) t_v^{-1}(v))/(v(1-\rho^2)))^{-0.5(v+2)}  )} {\sqrt{1-\rho^2} \cdot \Gamma(0.5(v+1))^2  (1+ t_v^{-2}(u)/v)^{-0.5(v+1)}  (1+ t_v^{-2}(v)/v)^{-0.5(v+1)} } \\ & \text{where } \rho\in (-1,1)\\ & \text{where } \phi(z)= \frac{1}{\sqrt{2\pi}} \int\limits_{-\infty}^z \exp \left(\frac{-t^2}{2}\right) \, dt \\ & \text{where } t_v(x\mid v)=  \int\limits_{-\infty}^x \frac{\Gamma{(0.5(v+1))}}{\sqrt{v\pi}(\Gamma{0.5v})(1+v^{-1}t^2)^{0.5(v+1)}} dt\\ & \text{where } v=\text{degrees of freedom} \\ & \text{where } \Gamma \text{ is the Gamma function} \end{align}$$	supervised SAR image classification, fusion of correlated sensor decisions
Nakagami-m		
Rician		

TABLE 1: Copula density function of a family of copulas used in signal processing.
