= Coppola Foods =

Italian food company

- Type: Private (family-owned)
- Industry: Food Processing
- Headquarters: London, United Kingdom; Mercato San Severino, Italy
- Area served: Worldwide
- Products: Canned tomatoes, beans and vegetables, soups and sauces, olive oil, rice
- Website: www.coppolafoods.com

Coppola Foods, officially Coppola Industria Alimentare, is an Italian food family owned company with a heritage dating back to 1903 in the production and supply of Italian food products.

The company is based in Mercato San Severino, close to Salerno in southern Italy, within the main Italian industrial tomato processing district. Coppola Industria Alimentare distributes the majority of its products to international markets.

== History ==
- 1903: Gerardo Coppola establishes a food-trading and serving business in Fontana Formiello in Mercato San Severino.
- 1936: Ernesto Coppola takes over the trading business from his father and expands the trading activities to include pasta, grains and legumes.
- 1952: Ernesto Coppola sets up a cannery in Mercato San Severino and starts canning the San Marzano tomatoes grown in the area on an industrial scale.
- 1969: Eugenio Coppola joins his father and brothers’ tomato canning business and oversees its growth and expansion.
- 2012: Ernesto Coppola and Maria Suleymanova establish Coppola Foods in London, UK, with innovation at its heart to develop the Coppola brand worldwide.
- 2015: Coppola Foods sets up a distribution platform in Latin America, Coppola Foods do Brasil, headed by Andrea Carpentieri
- 2018: Coppola Foods opens a commercial office in Melbourne, Australia, to serve the Asia Pacific region

== Products ==
- Preserved tomatoes
- Sauces, pesto and soups
- Condiments (ketchup, mayonnaise, oils and vinegars)
- Preserved vegetables (beans, antipasti and olives)
- Grains (rice, farro, barley, millet and polenta)
- Spreads

== Brands ==
- Coppola Salerno
- La Fonte
- D'ARCO
- Fontana FORMIELLO
- Hillfield
- Fabalous

== Awards ==
Fabulous organic cocoa and hazelnut chickpea spread was awarded Innovative Better-For-You Product of the Year at Food Matters Live 2019.

Coppola Foods was one of Europe's fastest growing Italian food companies according to 2018 and 2019 Financial Times' FT 1000: Europe's Fastest Growing Companies list.

Coppola Foods is registered in the Registry of Historic Italian Companies. This registry is kept by Unioncamere, the Association of Italian Chambers of Commerce, and contains all companies that have been in business for more than 100 years.
