= Cupola House (Egg Harbor, Wisconsin) =

Historic house in Wisconsin, United States

- U.S. National Register of Historic Places
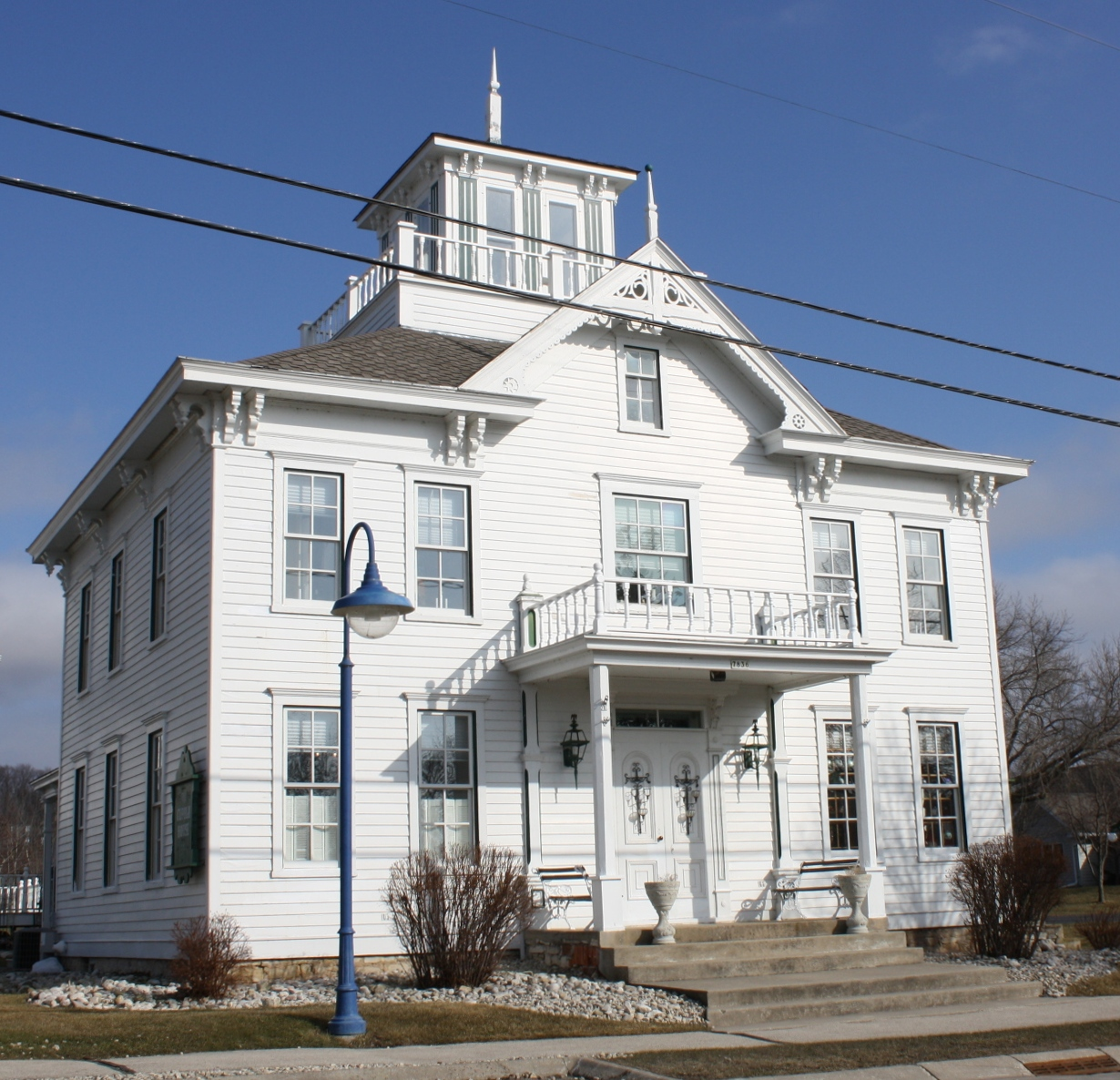

- Location within Wisconsin Location within the United States
- Location: 7836 Egg Harbor Rd. Egg Harbor, Wisconsin
- Coordinates: 45°3′5″N 87°16′49″W
- Built: 1871
- Architectural style: Victorian, Italianate
- NRHP reference No.: 79000073
- Added to NRHP: July 16, 1979

The Cupola House is a historic house located in Egg Harbor, Wisconsin. It was added to the National Register of Historic Places in 1979.

== History ==
The house was built by Levi Thorp. Thorp paid for it with gold he acquired during the California Gold Rush. The building now houses an art gallery, a cafe and a shop.
