= Cupola House, Bury St Edmunds =

Building in Bury St Edmunds, Suffolk, England

Cupola House
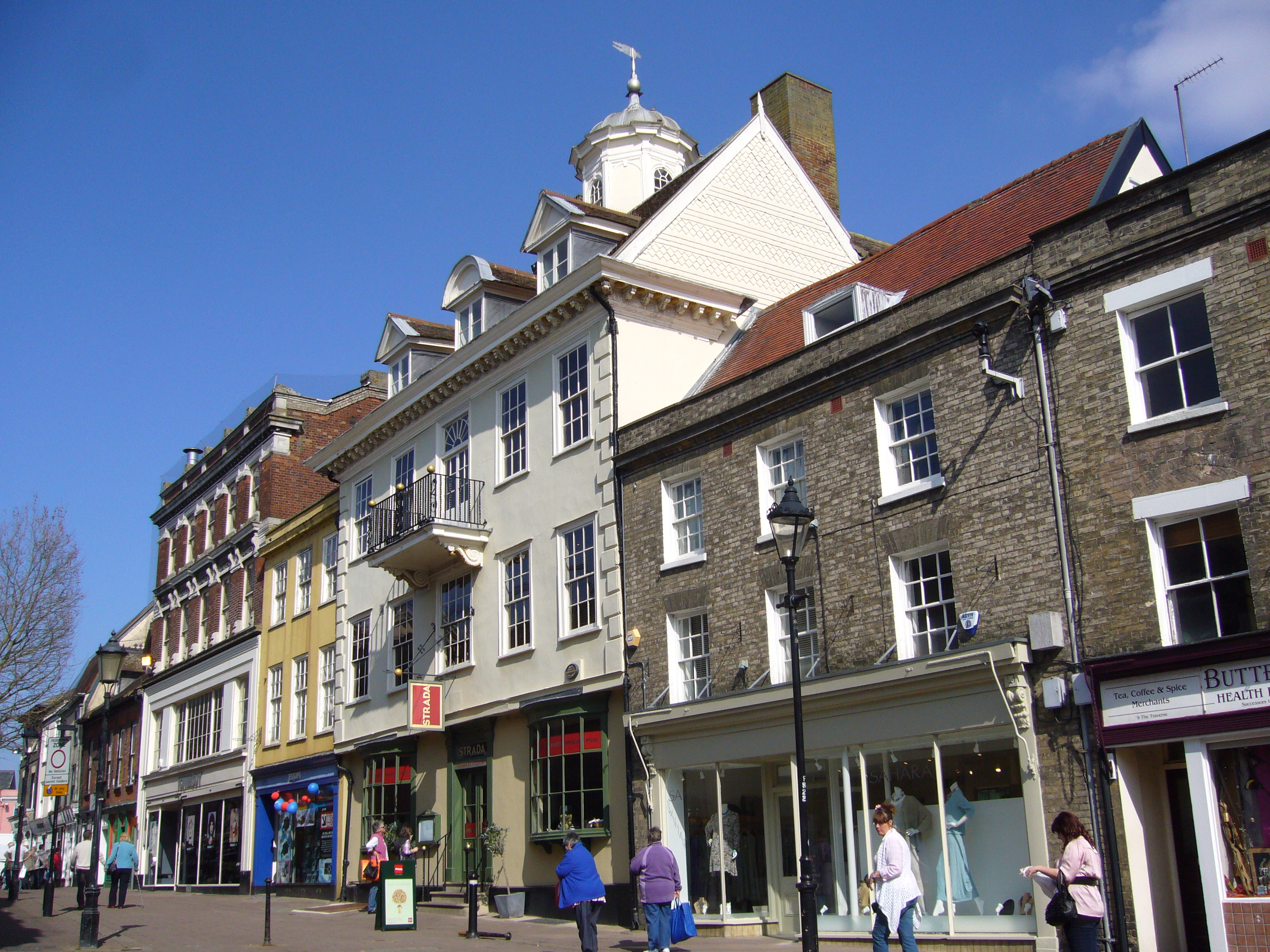
- The building in 2011
- Interactive map of the Cupola House area

General information
- Status: Grade II listed
- Location: Bury St Edmunds, Suffolk, 7 The Traverse, United Kingdom
- Coordinates: 52°14′43.440″N 0°42′45.216″E grid reference TL 85282 64268

Cupola House is a building in Bury St Edmunds, Suffolk, England. It dates from the 17th century, and was restored after a serious fire in 2012. It is a Grade II listed building.

== History and description ==
The building, on The Traverse, has three storeys, an attic and cellars. It was originally two timber-framed properties, converted during the 17th century by Thomas Macro, a prosperous apothecary, into a ground-floor shop with a dwelling above.

His son Thomas Macro (died 1737, aged 88), grocer, alderman and five times chief magistrate of Bury St Edmunds, made extensive modifications to the building. The height was increased and Baroque features were added, including an iron balcony and a cupola, on which was fitted a ball finial and weather vane bearing the date 1693 and initials TMS (Thomas Macro and his wife Susan).

It remained in the family until the mid 18th century, afterwards having a succession of owners. In the early 20th century it was owned by Clarke's Brewery, which amalgamated in 1917 with Greene King. They retained the property until 2002. It was renovated and restored in 2004, and was opened as a restaurant.

=== Fire and restoration ===
On 16 June 2012 it was badly damaged in a fire; the front survived, but the rear of the building, and most of the second floor, attic and roof was lost. Restoration, including the installation of a metal frame, was completed in August 2016. The surviving fabric was largely retained, and some material salvaged from the fire was re-used. The oak staircase is a replica of the original, and the panelled doors, fireplace surrounds and panelled dados are reproductions, as is the cupola.

Cupola House opened as a restaurant in May 2017, but closed the following year. In 2019 a new restaurant opened.

== See also ==
- Cox Macro
