= Guillermo Coppola (footballer) =

Argentine footballer

Personal information
- Full name: Guillermo Mario Coppola
- Date of birth: 8 January 1969 (age 57)
- Place of birth: Buenos Aires, Argentina
- Height: 1.71 m (5 ft 7 in)
- Position: Forward

Senior career*
Years	Team	Apps	(Gls)
1987–1990	Club Atlético Platense	7	(0)
1990–1991	GKS Katowice	8	(0)
1992–1993	Deportivo Armenio		
- * Club domestic league appearances and goals

Guillermo Mario Coppola (born 8 January 1969) is an Argentine retired footballer who played primarily as forward.

== Club career ==
Born in Buenos Aires, Coppola began his career in 1987 at Club Atlético Platense. In 1990 he joined Polish I liga site GKS Katowice. He made his league debut in 0–1 defeat against Śląsk Wrocław on 16 March 1991. Representing the club in 1990–91 season Coppola made 8 league appearances without any goal scored, winning Polish Cup in the summer of 1991. In 1993, after a short spell with Deportivo Armenio, he retired from professional football.

== Honours ==
GKS Katowice

- Polish Cup: 1990–91
