= Stereocephalus =

Scientific classification
- Kingdom: Animalia
- Phylum: Arthropoda
- Class: Insecta
- Order: Coleoptera
- Suborder: Polyphaga
- Infraorder: Staphyliniformia
- Family: Staphylinidae
- Subfamily: Paederinae
- Genus: Stereocephalus; Lynch, 1884

Type species
- Stereocephalus seriatipennis Lynch, 1884

Species
- Stereocephalus myrigeus; Stereocephalus rinnanus; Stereocephalus ruhus; Stereocephalus seriatipennis

Genus of beetles

Stereocephalus is a genus of rove beetles from South America described by Félix Lynch Arribálzaga in 1884, with species found in Argentina, Brazil, Paraguay and Venezuela.

== Description ==
Stereocephalus beetles range from 4 to 14 mm (0.16 to 0.55 in) long, and are reddish brown in color.

== Species ==
Species	Taxon author	Geographic range	Notes
Stereocephalus myrigeus	Herman, 1979	Central Brazil (Mato Grosso, including Xingu National Park)	The largest of the genus, up to 14 mm long, with large, protuberant eyes.
Stereocephalus rinnanus	Herman, 1979	Southeast Brazil (Rio de Janeiro state)	Differs from other Stereocephalus in having two bare spots (lacking setae) on head. 7.2 to 8.5 mm long.
Stereocephalus ruhus	Herman, 1979	Northern Brazil (Pará)	Around 4 mm long.
Stereocephalus seriatipennis	Lynch, 1884	Northern Argentina, Paraguay, southern Brazil, and northern Venezuela	6 to 7.5 mm long, also known as S. dilaticeps
