= Copala, Guerrero =

City in the Mexican state of Guerrero

Copala
- Municipal seat and city
- Location in Mexico Copala (Mexico)
- Coordinates: 16°39′N 98°59′W
- Country: Mexico
- State: Guerrero
- Municipality: Copala

Government
- Time zone: UTC-6 (Zona Centro)

Copala is a city and the seat of the municipality of Copala, in the southern Mexican state of Guerrero.

In June 2024, Salvador Villalba Flores, the mayor-elect of the town from the México Avanza party, was assassinated in the town while traveling on a bus to Mexico City. Local media also reported Villalba had decided to run for mayor after his friend, a candidate, was murdered in June 2023.
