= Copala (municipality) =

Municipality in the Mexican state of Guerrero

- Municipality
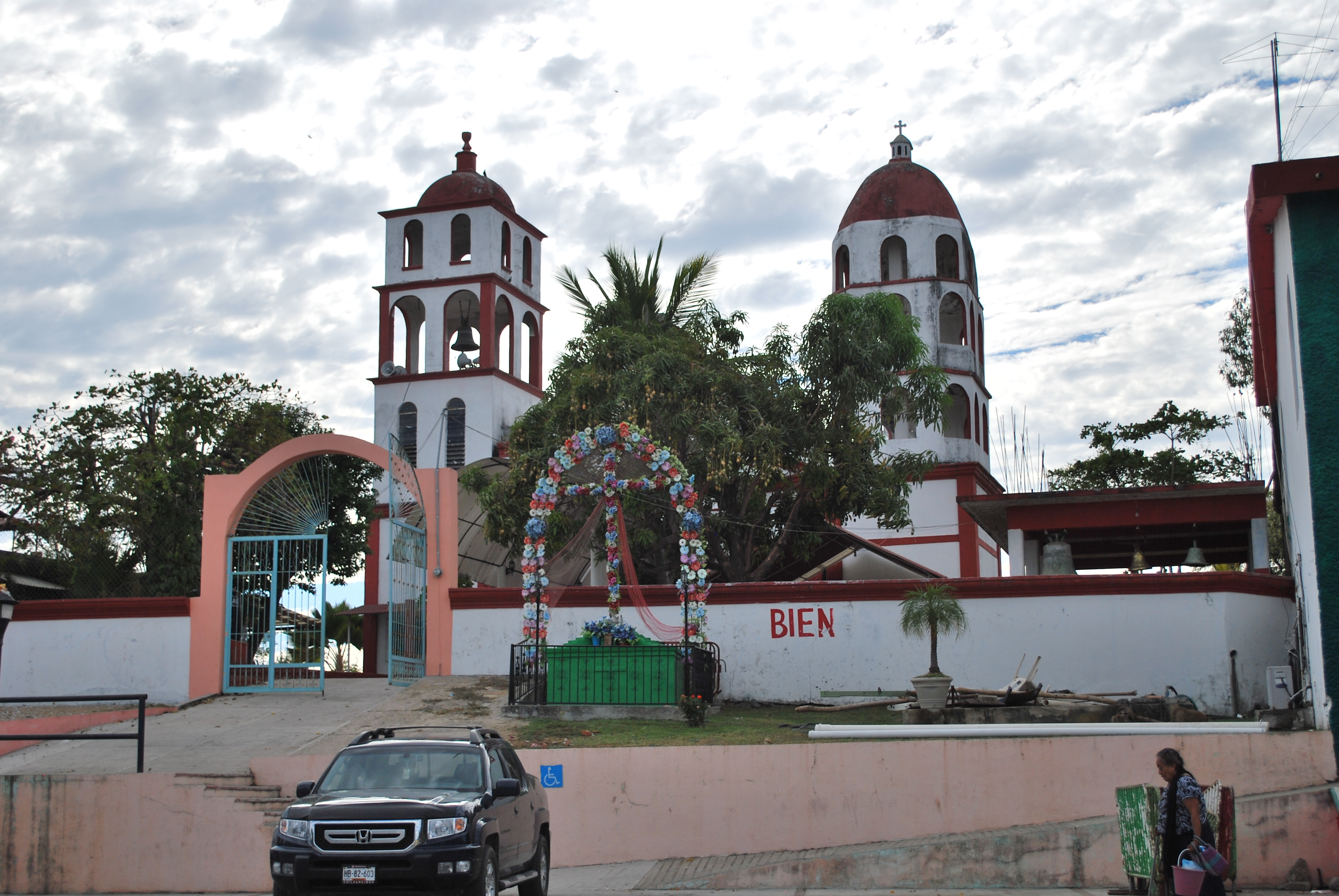
- Parish church in Copala, Guerrero

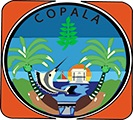
- Coat of arms

- Location in Mexico
- Coordinates: 16°30′N 98°0′W
- Country: Mexico
- State: Guerrero
- Municipal seat: Copala

Area
  - Total: 344.4 km^{2} (133.0 sq mi)

Population (2005)
  - Total: 11,896

Copala is a municipality in the Mexican state of Guerrero. The municipal seat lies at Copala. It is known for its beach, Playa Ventura. The municipality covers an area of 344.4 km^{2}.

As of 2005, the municipality had a total population of 11,896.
