= Ginny Coppola =

American politician

Member of the Massachusetts House of Representatives from the 1st Bristol District
- In office 2006–2007
- Preceded by: Michael J. Coppola
- Succeeded by: F. Jay Barrows

Personal details
- Born: May 7, 1949 (age 77) Boston, Massachusetts
- Party: Republican
- Spouse: Michael J. Coppola
- Education: University of Massachusetts
- Occupation: Political aide

Virginia M. "Ginny" Coppola (born May 7, 1949) is an American political aide and politician who represented the 1st Bristol District in the Massachusetts House of Representatives from 2006 to 2007. She succeeded her late husband Michael J. Coppola, who died eight months into his third term.
