= Cochlear cupula =

Structure in the inner ear

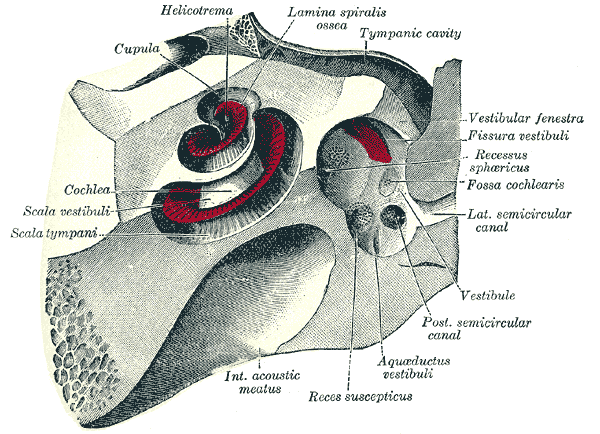
- The cochlea and vestibule, viewed from above. (Cupula labeled at upper left.)

Details

Identifiers
- Latin: cupula cochleae
- TA98: A15.3.03.026
- TA2: 6965
- FMA: 77706

The cochlear cupula is a structure in the cochlea. It is the apex of the cochlea. The bony canal of the cochlea takes two and three-quarter turns around the modiolus. The modiolus is about 35 mm in length, and diminishes gradually in diameter from the base to the summit, where it terminates in the cupula. The cupula points towards the anterosuperior area of the medial wall of the tympanic cavity.
