= Mario Coppola (footballer) =

Italian footballer

Personal information
- Date of birth: 7 August 1990 (age 36)
- Place of birth: Aversa, Italy
- Height: 1.79 m (5 ft 10 in)
- Position: Midfielder

Team information
- Current team: Bitonto

Youth career
- –2009: Bologna
- 2009–2010: Lazio

Senior career*
| Years | Team | Apps | (Gls) |
| 2010–2011 | Pomezia | 24 | (0) |
| 2011–2013 | Portosummaga | 28 | (2) |
| 2013–2014 | Sorrento | 31 | (2) |
| 2014–2015 | Arezzo | 25 | (0) |
| 2015–2016 | Pro Patria | 29 | (1) |
| 2016–2017 | Nocerina | 41 | (1) |
| 2017–2021 | Potenza | 93 | (1) |
| 2021–2023 | Vis Pesaro | 68 | (0) |
| 2023–2024 | Gelbison | 3 | (0) |
| 2024– | Bitonto | 0 | (0) |
- * Club domestic league appearances and goals as of 20 December 2023

Mario Coppola (born 7 August 1990) is an Italian professional footballer who plays as a midfielder for Serie D club Bitonto.

== Career ==
Born in Aversa, Coppola started his career in Bologna and Lazio youth sector. As a senior, he made his debut in 2010–11 Lega Pro Seconda Divisione with Pomezia.

On 30 September 2015, he joined to Pro Patria in Serie C.

The next season, on 8 July 2016 he moved to Serie D side Nocerina.

He played one year for Nocerina, and in December 2017 joined to Potenza, also in Serie D. He played four seasons for the club, winning the promotion on his first year, and he also was a captain.

On 23 July 2021, he signed with Vis Pesaro. On 1 September 2023, Coppola's contract with Vis Pesaro was terminated by mutual consent.
