= Mario Coppola (physicist) =

Italian physicist

Mario Coppola (Rome, February 5, 1937 – Rome, March 5, 2011) was an Italian physicist active in the field of nuclear physics. Coppola, son of Leonardo and Elena Alestra lived his early childhood in Rome until the degree in physics in 1960, a student of Edoardo Amaldi. From 1961 to 1964 was PostDoc at Columbia University in New York, then for a short period, the University of Padua, and subsequently worked in the years 1964 to 1971 the Bureau Central de Mesures Nucleaires (BCMN) Euratom Geel (Belgium). He obtained his teaching qualification in Nuclear Physics at the University of Milan in 1969.

Mario has served as Scientific Officer at the Joint Research Centre (JRC) in Ispra Agency from 1971 to 1977. From there he moved, as an international civil servant at the CNEN, which later became the center of Enea Casaccia in Rome, where he was active until 2000, as head of European research contracts.

It was co-founder, Scientific Secretary and then President and then director emeritus of the Italian Society for Research on Radiation (SIRR).

Among other assignments, he was a consultant of the United Nations Mario Scientific Committee on the Effects of Atomic Radiations (UNSCEAR), a member of the Scientific Committee of the International Association for Radiation Research (IARR) and was a member of the Scientific Committee of several national conferences and international.

He has authored about 150 publications on international and ionizing radiation on the physical and biological.
