= Michael J. Coppola =

American politician (1942–2005)

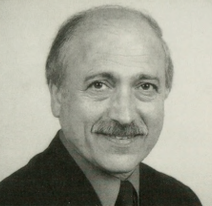
- Portrait of Michael J. Coppola

Member of the Massachusetts House of Representatives from the 1st Bristol District
- In office 2001–2005
- Preceded by: Barbara Hyland
- Succeeded by: Ginny Coppola

Personal details
- Born: December 7, 1942 Boston, Massachusetts
- Died: August 26, 2005 (aged 62) Attleboro, Massachusetts
- Party: Republican
- Spouse: Ginny Coppola
- Education: Dalbec Barber College
- Occupation: Barber; Motorcycle parts distributor Politician

Michael J. Coppola (December 7, 1942 in Boston, Massachusetts – August 26, 2005 in Attleboro, Massachusetts) was an American politician who represented the 1st Bristol District in the Massachusetts House of Representatives from 2001 to 2005. He had previously served as a member of the Foxborough, Massachusetts, Board of Selectmen from 1989 to 2001.

Coppola died on August 26, 2005, from colon cancer. He was succeeded as State Representative by his widow, Ginny Coppola.
