= Copula =

Copula is a Latinate term meaning 'link' which may refer to:

== Arts and entertainment ==
- Beatmania IIDX 23: Copula, a 2015 rhythm game
- Copula (music), a polyphonic texture

== Biology ==
- Copula (cnidarian), a genus of box jellyfish
- Copula linguae, an embryonic structure of the tongue

== Linguistics ==
- Copula (linguistics), a word used to link subject and predicate
  - Indo-European copula
    - Romance copula

== Mathematics ==
- Copula (probability theory), a function linking marginal variables into a multivariate distribution
  - Copulas in signal processing
