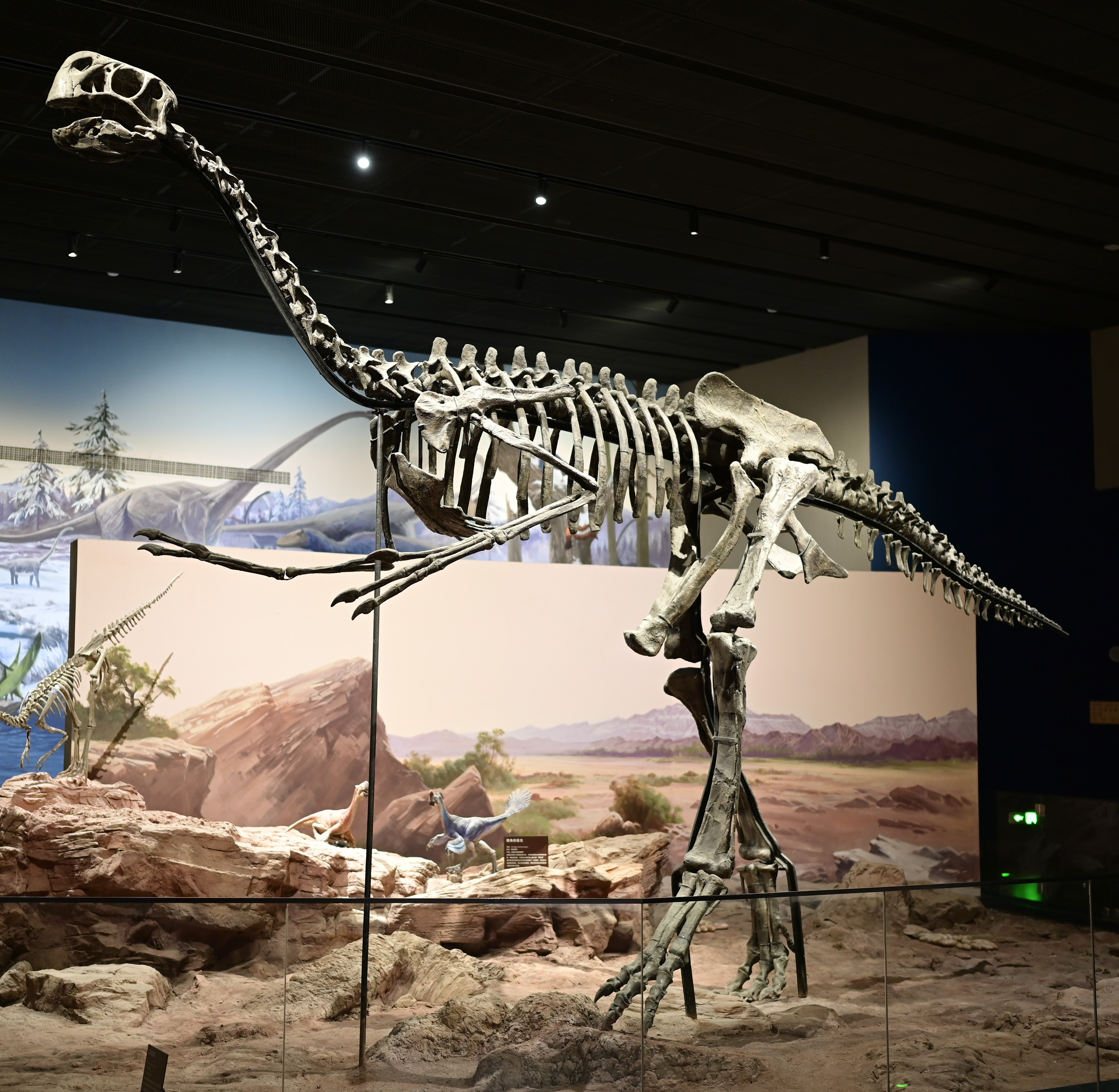
- Mounted reconstructed skeleton of Gigantoraptor, Baoding Natural History Museum

Scientific classification
- Kingdom: Animalia
- Phylum: Chordata
- Class: Reptilia
- Clade: Dinosauria
- Clade: Saurischia
- Clade: Theropoda
- Superfamily: †Caenagnathoidea
- Family: †Caenagnathidae
- Genus: †Gigantoraptor; Xu et al., 2007

Type species
- †Gigantoraptor erlianensis Xu et al., 2007

= Gigantoraptor =

Gigantoraptor Temporal range: Late Cretaceous, ~95–80 Ma

Extinct genus of dinosaurs

Gigantoraptor (lit. 'giant thief') is a genus of large oviraptorosaurian dinosaur that lived in Asia during the Late Cretaceous period. It is known from the Iren Dabasu Formation of Inner Mongolia, where the first remains were found in 2005.

Gigantoraptor was the largest-known oviraptorosaur, reaching 8 or 8.6 metres (26 or 28 ft) in length and 1.4–2 metric tons (1.5–2.2 short tons) in body mass. It had an extensively pneumatized vertebral column and elongated arms and legs. Both femur and tibia measured over 1 m (3.3 ft) in length, an unusual trait among giant theropods. The lower jaws were toothless and ended in a keratinous beak, as seen in other oviraptorosaurs. Though several oviraptorosaur species are known to have developed a full coat of feathers, Gigantoraptor, due to its size, could have lost some of this integument.

The genus is classified as an oviraptorosaurian dinosaur, a group of generally small feathered animals. Though it was originally found to represent a basal oviraptorid, subsequent analyses have shown it to be a caenagnathid. It was a giant, ground-dwelling bipedal omnivore or herbivore with a shearing bite as indicated by the preserved mandible. The shape of its beak indicates a generalist diet with a potentially occasional carnivory. The holotype—and only known specimen—has been determined to represent a young adult that died at the age of 11, and it reached a young adulthood around 7 years of life. Such development indicates an accelerated growth compared to other large theropods. The discovery and examination of large oviraptorosaur eggs, Macroelongatoolithus, indicates that large genera such as Gigantoraptor built their nests with the center lacking eggs in order to avoid crushing.

== History of discovery ==
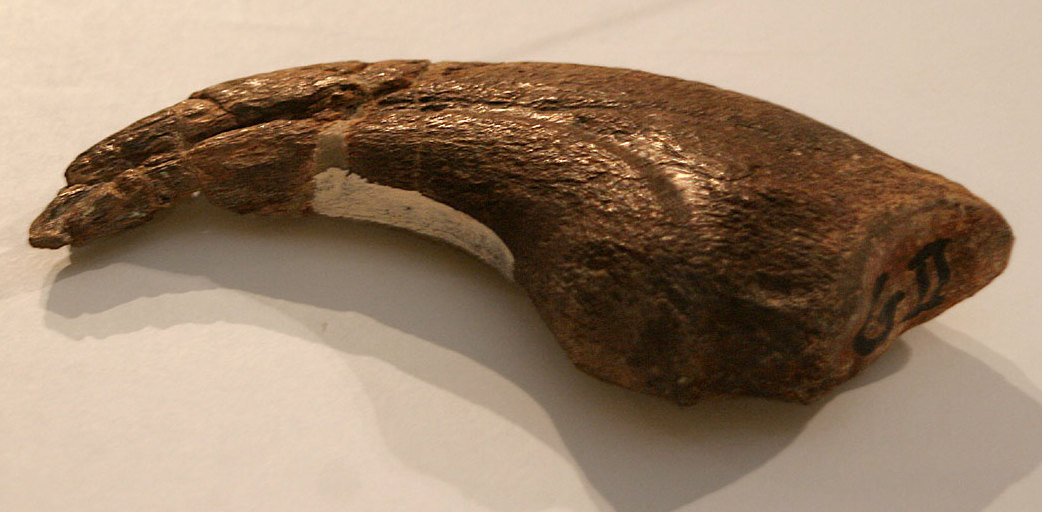
A manual ungual of the holotype

At a quarry at Saihangaobi, Iren Dabasu Formation, Erlian basin, Sonid Left Banner (Inner Mongolia), numerous remains of the sauropod Sonidosaurus have been discovered since 2001. In April 2005, Chinese paleontologist Xu Xing was asked to reenact the discovery of Sonidosaurus for a Japanese documentary. During filming, Xu excavated a thighbone and after cleaning it, recognized that it was not from a sauropod but belonged to an unidentified theropod comparable in size to Albertosaurus. The filming was halted while the specimen was secured, and the discovery of what became the holotype of Gigantoraptor was consequently captured on film. The footage has since been lost

In 2007, the type species Gigantoraptor erlianensis was named and described by Xu, Tan Qingwei, Wang Jianmin, Zhao Xijin and Tan Lin. The generic name, Gigantoraptor, is derived from the Latin gigas, gigantis, meaning "giant" and raptor, meaning "seizer". The specific name, erlianensis, refers to the Erlian basin. The holotype, LH V0011, consists of the incomplete and disassociated remains of a single adult individual, preserving a nearly complete mandible, a partial isolated cervical vertebra, dorsal vertebrae, caudal vertebrae, right scapula, right humerus, right radius and ulna, nearly complete right manus, partial ilium with a nearly complete pubis and hindlimbs, including both femur, tibia and fibula with a very complete pes. It is currently housed at the Longhao Institute of Geology and Paleontology.

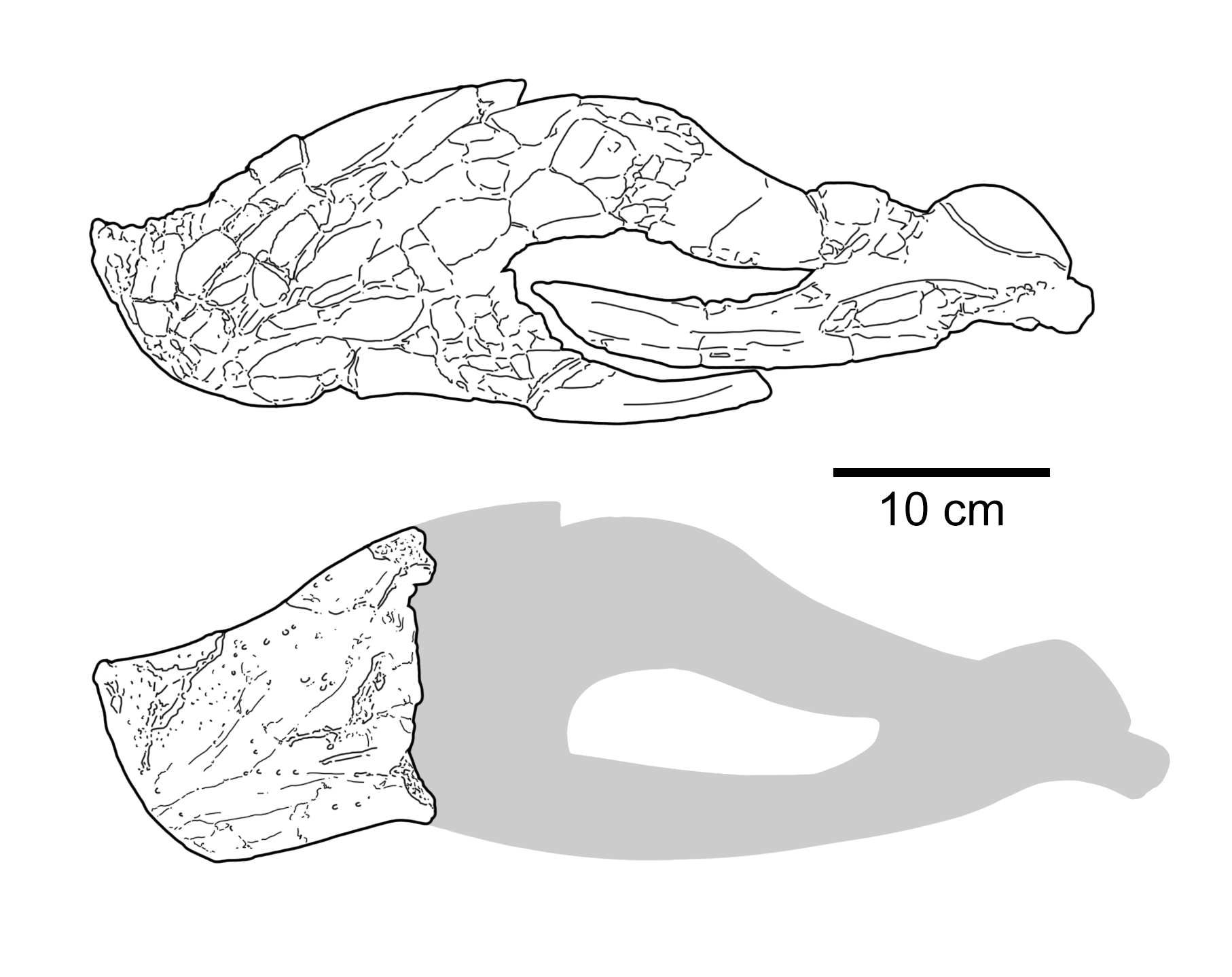
Holotype lower jaw of Gigantoraptor (top) compared to dentary of MPC-D 107/17 (bottom)

In 2015, Takanobu Tsuihiji with team reported a partial—and large—caenagnathid dentary (specimen MPC-D 107/17) from the Bayan Shireh Formation, discovered in 2008 by the Hayashibara Museum of Natural Sciences-Mongolian Paleontological Center Joint Expedition, at the Tsagaan Teg locality. As preserved, the dentary is virtually similar to that of Gigantoraptor in both morphology and size. Despite shared traits between Gigantoraptor and MPC-D 107/17, and their close relationships, Tsuihiji and team regarded it as Caenagnathidae indet. due to its fragmentary nature. Authors Rubén Molina-Pérez and Asier Larramendi in 2019 assigned this partial dentary as cf. Gigantoraptor erlianensis, suggesting that it could represent an additional specimen.

== Description ==
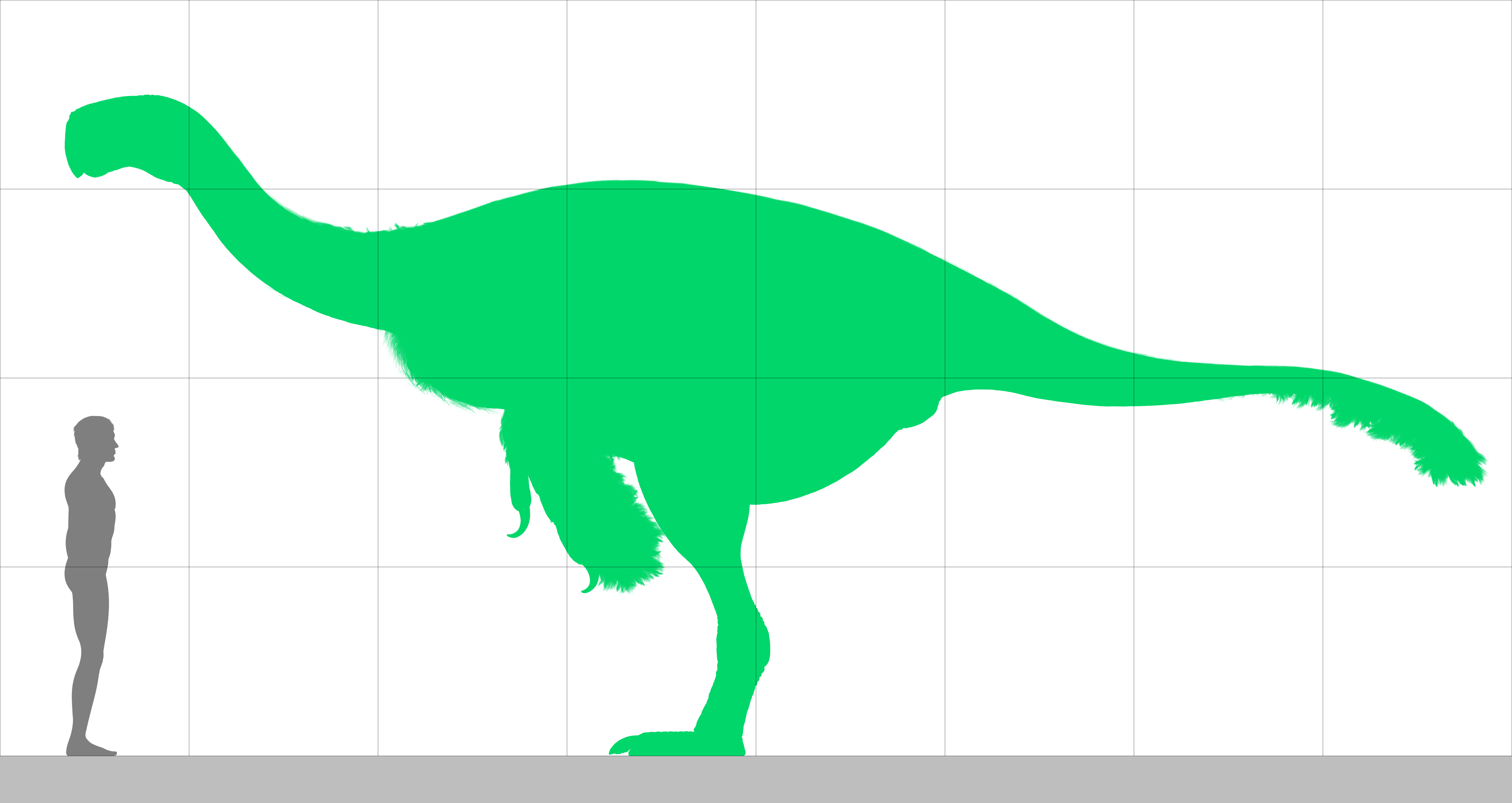
Gigantoraptor size (holotype) compared to a 1.8-metre-tall (5.9 ft) human

Gigantoraptor is the largest known oviraptorosaur for which skeletal material is available. Approximately three times as long and 35 times heavier than the largest earlier-discovered oviraptorosaur Citipati, the holotype of Gigantoraptor has been estimated at 8 m (26.2 ft) long with a height of 3.5 m (11.5 ft) at the hips, and a ponderous weight of 1.4 metric tons (1.5 short tons). Other studies have estimated it to be 2 t (2.2 short tons) in weight, and one at 8.6 m (28.2 ft) in length.

Oviraptorosaurs are fairly known to have developed feathers, as seen on feathered specimens of Caudipteryx and the pygostyle of several oviraptorids. As an oviraptorosaur, Gigantoraptor was likely feathered as well, however, given its massive size it may have been partially naked.

=== Skull ===
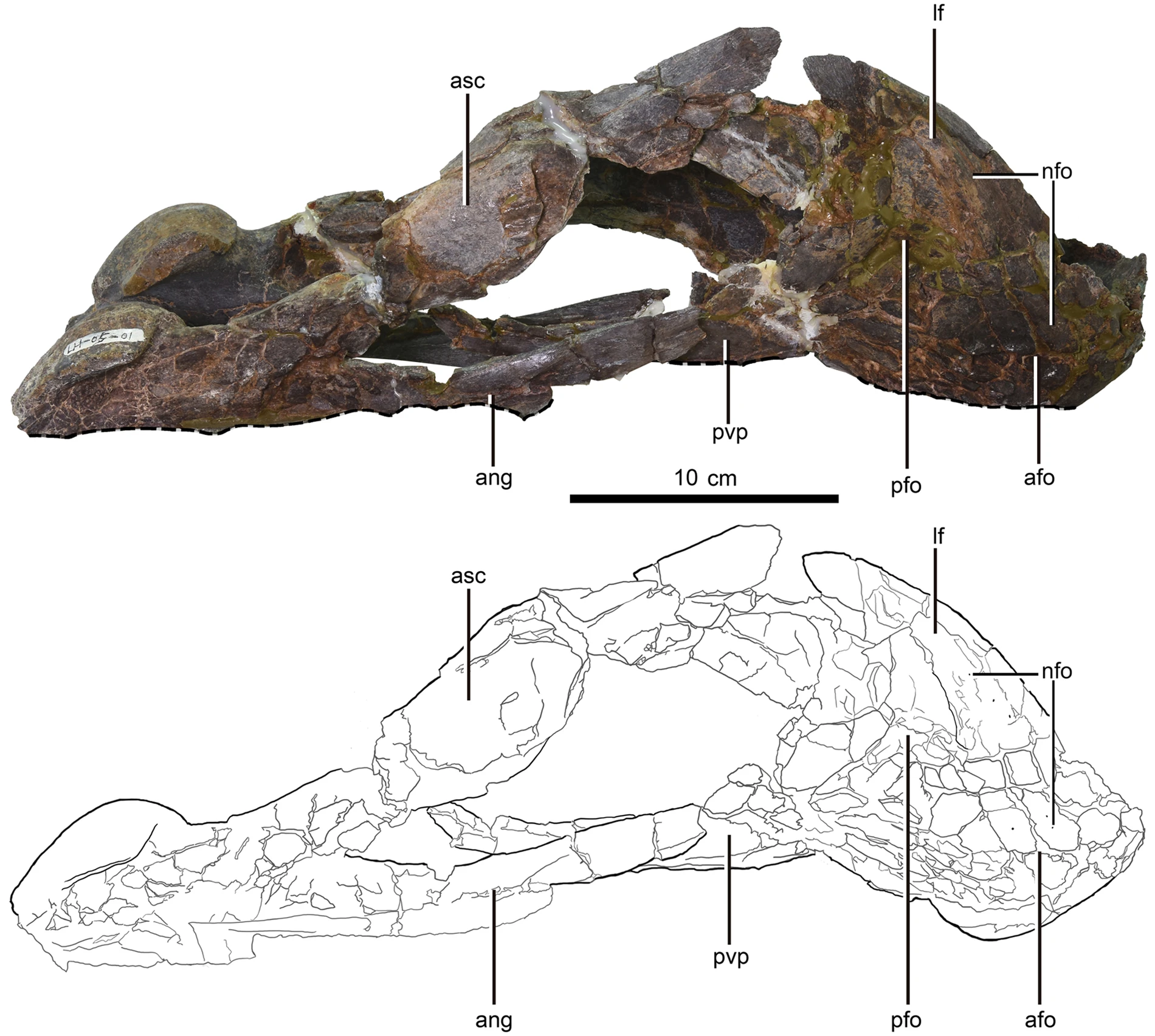
Holotype mandible in right lateral view

As preserved, the total length of the lower jaws is 46 cm (460 mm), and they are toothless. This element fused into a broad shovel-like shape, indicating that the unknown skull was over half a metre long and also toothless, likely equipped with a rhamphotheca (horny beak). Compared to the right side, the left side of the jaws is well-preserved with an almost intact shape. The dentary bones are very deep and toothless, and have a pair of sharply-developed shelves on the top edges. These structures are relatively flat. The anterior end of the dentary is rounded, more similar to caenagnathids and different from the chin-shaped one of some oviraptorids. From a top view, the symphyseal (bone union) region at the front of the dentary is U-shaped. Along the lateral surfaces of this bone, some nutrient foramina can be found, which likely supported a rhamphotheca.

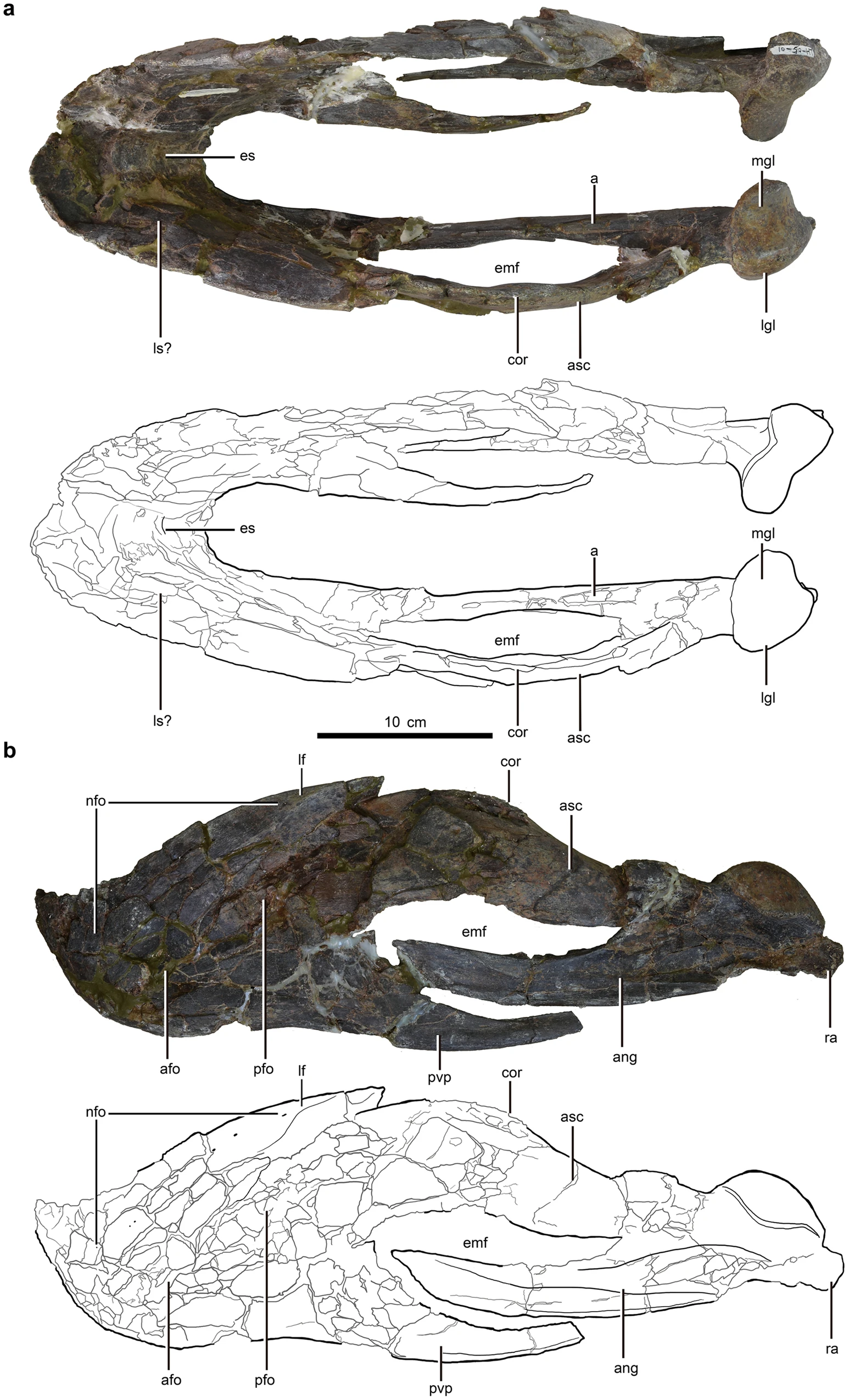
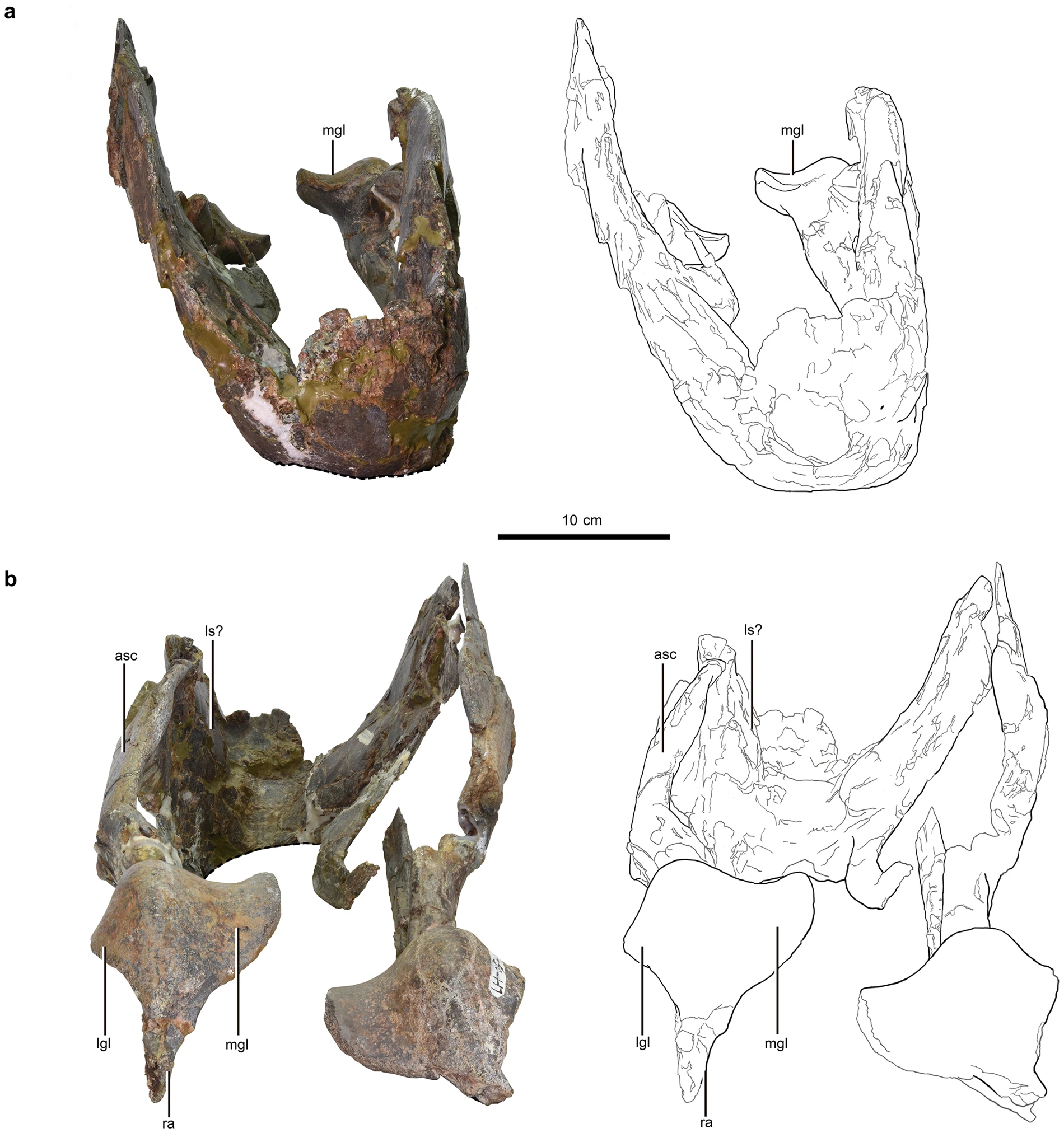
Holotype mandible in lateral, dorsal, anterior and posterior views

Both angular and articular-surangular-coronoid (ASC) complex are comparatively smaller than the dentary. The angular is firmly fused to the ASC complex and gives form to the lower margin of the external mandibular fenestra. The angular has a bowed shape and is mainly forwards extended with a large lateral depression that joints with the posterior lower process (bony projection/extension) of the dentary. The ASC complex is composed by the fusion of the articular and surangular bones with the coronoid process of the mandible. This complex extends forwards to articulate with the posterior upper process of the dentary and gives form to the upper margin of the external mandibular fenestra. The coronoid process prominence is low and distinctively rounded. On the posterior end of the mandibles the articular glenoid can be located. It is relatively large, convex, and bowl-shaped.

=== Postcranial skeleton ===
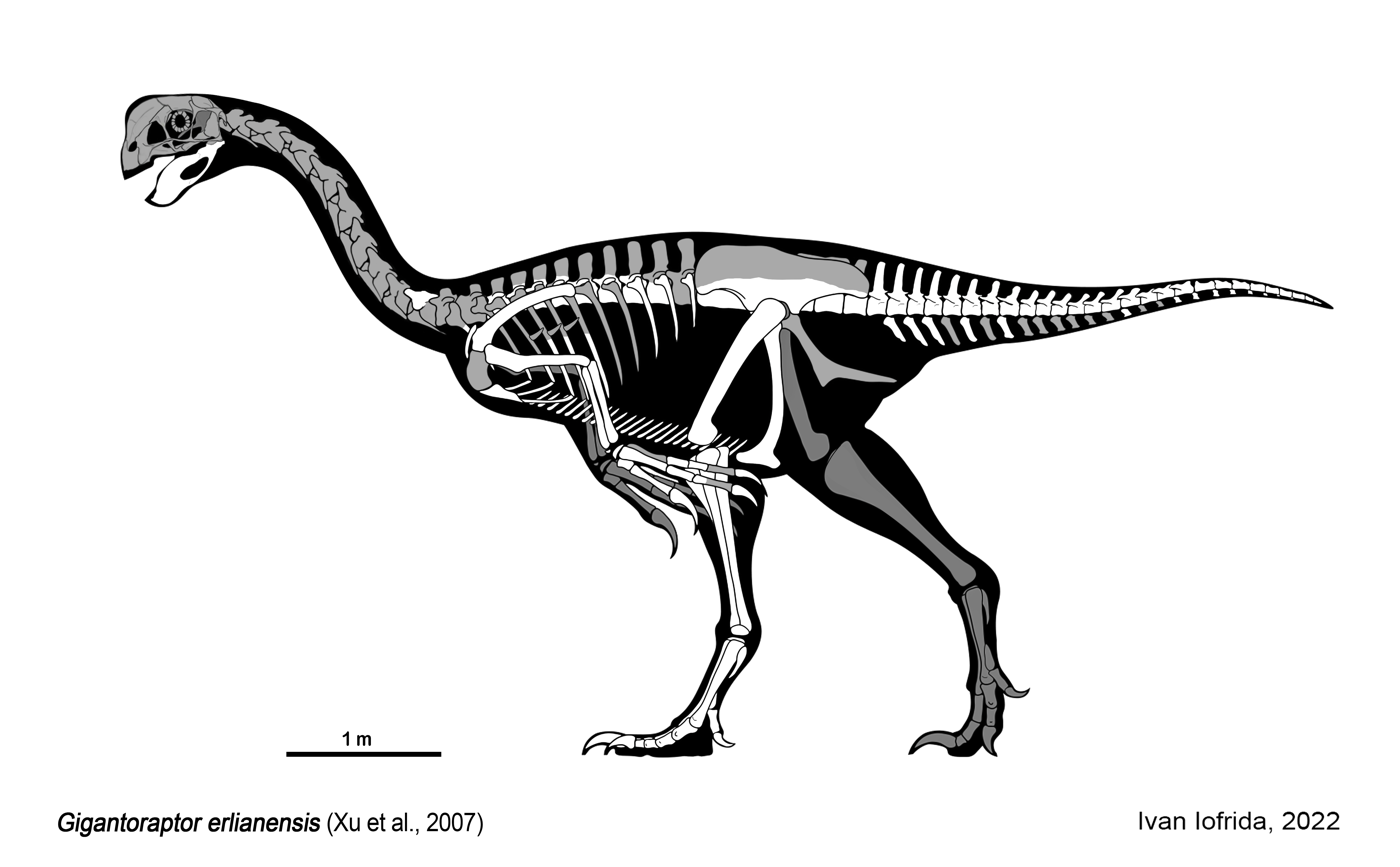
Skeletal reconstruction of the holotype, known remains in white

The anterior caudal vertebrae have very long neural spines and are heavily pneumaticised with deep pleurocoels. The middle section of the relatively short tail is somewhat stiffened by long prezygapophyses. The caudal vertebrae are heavily pneumatized with a spongeous-like bone filling. The forelimbs are rather long because of an elongated humerus (73.5 cm (2.41 ft) long) and slender manus. The humerus is bowed outwards to an exceptionally large extent and has a very rounded head, similar to some birds but unlike any other oviraptorosaur. This, along with a long and gracile antebrachium, suggests a very flexible arm with a wide range of motion that may have implications for foraging or display. The first metacarpal is very short and carries a strongly diverging thumb. The hindlimbs are well-developed and highly elongated: the femur is slender with a distinct head and neck, measuring 1.1 m (3.6 ft); the tibia has similar top and bottom borders and measures 1.10 m (3.6 ft) long; and the metatarsus is 58.3 cm (1.91 ft) long with the metatarsal III being the largest. The pes is robust with large and strongly curved pedal unguals.

== Classification ==
In 2007, Xu and colleagues assigned Gigantoraptor to the Oviraptoridae, in a basal (primitive) position. The anatomy of Gigantoraptor includes diagnostic features found in oviraptorosaurs. However, it also includes several features found in more derived eumaniraptoran dinosaurs, such as a forelimb/hindlimb ratio of 60%, a lack of expansion of the distal scapula and the lack of a fourth trochanter on the femur. Despite its size, Gigantoraptor would thus have been more bird-like than its smaller oviraptorosaurian relatives.

In 2010, a second analysis of Gigantoraptor relationships found it to be a member of the Caenagnathidae rather than an oviraptorid. Phylogenetic analysis conducted by Lamanna et al. (2014), supported that Gigantoraptor was a basal caenagnathid.

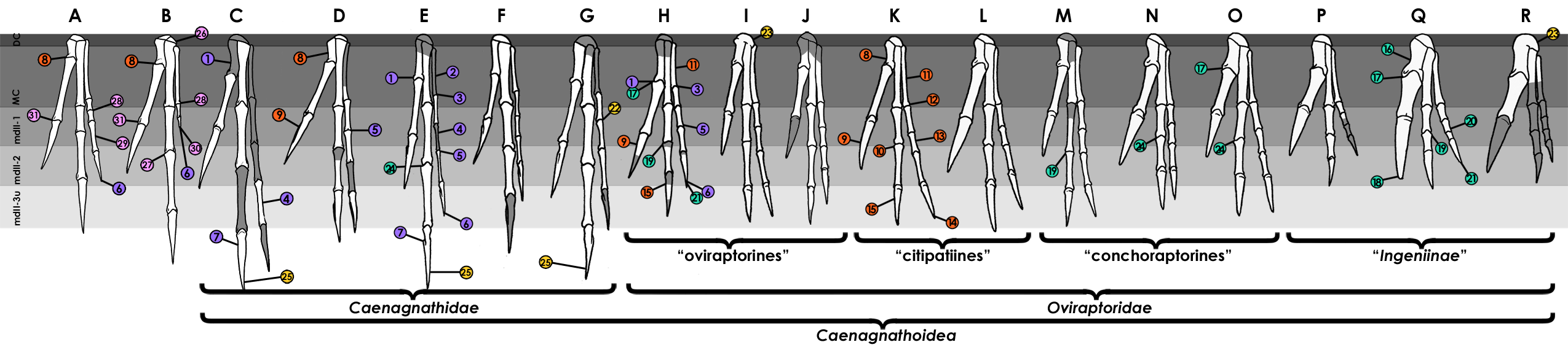
Comparison between the manus of Gigantoraptor (D) and other caenagnathoids

The cladogram below follows the phylogenetic analysis conducted by Funston & Currie in 2016, which found Gigantoraptor to be a caenagnathid.

- Caenagnathidae
  - Microvenator
  - - Gigantoraptor
    - - Hagryphus
      - - - Epichirostenotes
          - Anzu
        - - Caenagnathus
          - Elmisaurinae
            - Caenagnathasia
            - - Chirostenotes
              - - Leptorhynchos
                - - Apatoraptor
                  - Elmisaurus

== Paleobiology ==
=== Feathers ===
Life restoration

Xu and team in 2007 suggested that Gigantoraptor might have been partially "naked" because it is 300 times as heavy as feathered species like Caudipteryx, and large animals tend to rely more on body mass for temperature regulation, leading to the loss of insulating coverings found on their smaller relatives. However, they suggested that at least arm feathers were probably still present on Gigantoraptor, since their primary functions, such as display behaviour and covering the eggs while brooding, are not related to the regulation of body heat.

=== Ontogeny and development ===
A histological analysis performed on the holotype fibula by Xu and colleagues in 2007 showed that the specimen had seven lines of arrested growth (LAGs, or growth rings) as preserved. As several LAGs were missing, the team used inverse calculations to determine them, resulting in a total of 11. The amount of LAGs indicate the holotype was around 11 years old at the time of death and had an average growth of 128–140 kg (282–309 lb) per year. The performed histology also suggests that this individual was an adult, as there was extensive development of the secondary osteons, tightly packed LAGs close to the periphery of the bone, and a poorly vascularized layer of lamellar bone in the outer circumferential layer, which indicates a relatively sloppy growth rate. However, given that the fourth to seventh sets of LAGs were not very tightly packed, Xu and colleagues inferred that the individual reached its young adulthood at the age of 7. Moreover, the specimen was found to still be a relatively young adult and thereby it would have grown larger when it reached the adult stage. This indicates that Gigantoraptor had a growth rate much faster than most large non-avian theropods, such as tyrannosaurids.

Another unusual development in Gigantoraptor are the elongated hindlimbs. Xu and colleagues pointed out the larger the theropod becomes, the shorter and stockier the legs become in order to withstand the increasing mass. This is contrasted by Gigantoraptor with both femur and tibia being over 1 m (3.3 ft), a combination that is not usually found in theropods of this size. It was suggested the elongation of these limbs would make it the most cursorial—an animal adapted to run or maintain certain speed for a large amount of time—large theropods. Furthermore, Gigantoraptor had an extensively pneumatized vertebral column, which may have aided in weight loss. However, later analysis of the limb material found various features that directly contradicted a cursorial lifestyle, such as an elongated digit IV, curved toe claws, and the lack of an arctometatarsal condition.

=== Feeding ===
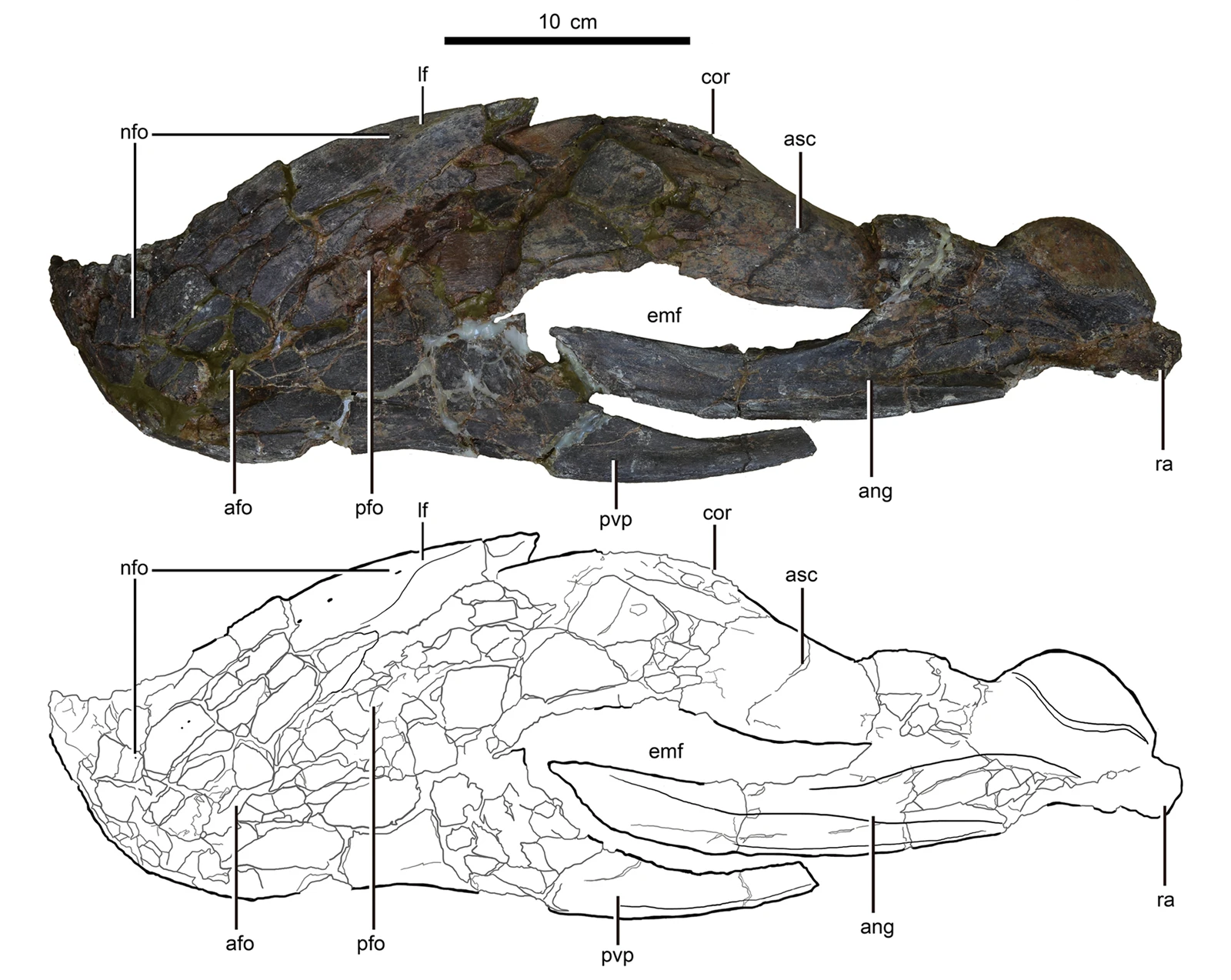
Lower jaw of the holotype

In 2017, Waisum Ma and colleagues re-examined the preserved jaws of Gigantoraptor and found that it had the deepest beak among caenagnathids and a relatively different diet from other oviraptorosaurs. For instance, the articular region of the jaws of Gigantoraptor show convergence to those of the modern tuatara. The articular region in this reptile enables propalinal jaw movement (a forward and backward movement) during feeding, and based on the similarities between their jaws, Ma and colleagues suggested that Gigantoraptor could have employed propalinal jaw movement as well. This movement aided with the sharp shelves of the dentary may indicate a shearing bite capable of cutting through plants (and potentially meat). This is comparable to other caenagnathids and contrasting with the jaws of oviraptorids, whose jaws seem better suited for crushing food. The depth of the lower jaw indicates the presence of a large tongue, which could have assisted the animal in food processing, and possibly improving the feeding efficiency.

As the shape and size of the rostrum in large herbivores is related to dietary habits, the strongly U-shaped dentary of Gigantoraptor may suggest that this oviraptorosaur was a highly non-selective feeder, an adaptation that could have been useful in the variable environmental settings of the Iren Dabasu Formation. The team based this hypothesis on comparisons with several herbivorous animals, including other dinosaurs. Whereas sharply developed and narrow rostra are more correlated with a selective diet, such as the case of some ceratopsians, wide and rounded rostra are more linked with a generalist diet, as seen on the morphology of Gigantoraptor, Euoplocephalus and hadrosaurids. Ma and colleagues also pointed out that its large size, and therefore greater energy requirements, could have influenced its dietary habits as larger animals tend to consume lower-quality food since it is available in larger amounts on the surroundings, and has a more stable supply. However, it is not known whether the gut of Gigantoraptor was specialized to process this greater ingestion. The team could not disregard an occasional carnivorous diet as the strong beak together with a propalinal jaw movement may have allowed meat processing.

=== Reproduction ===
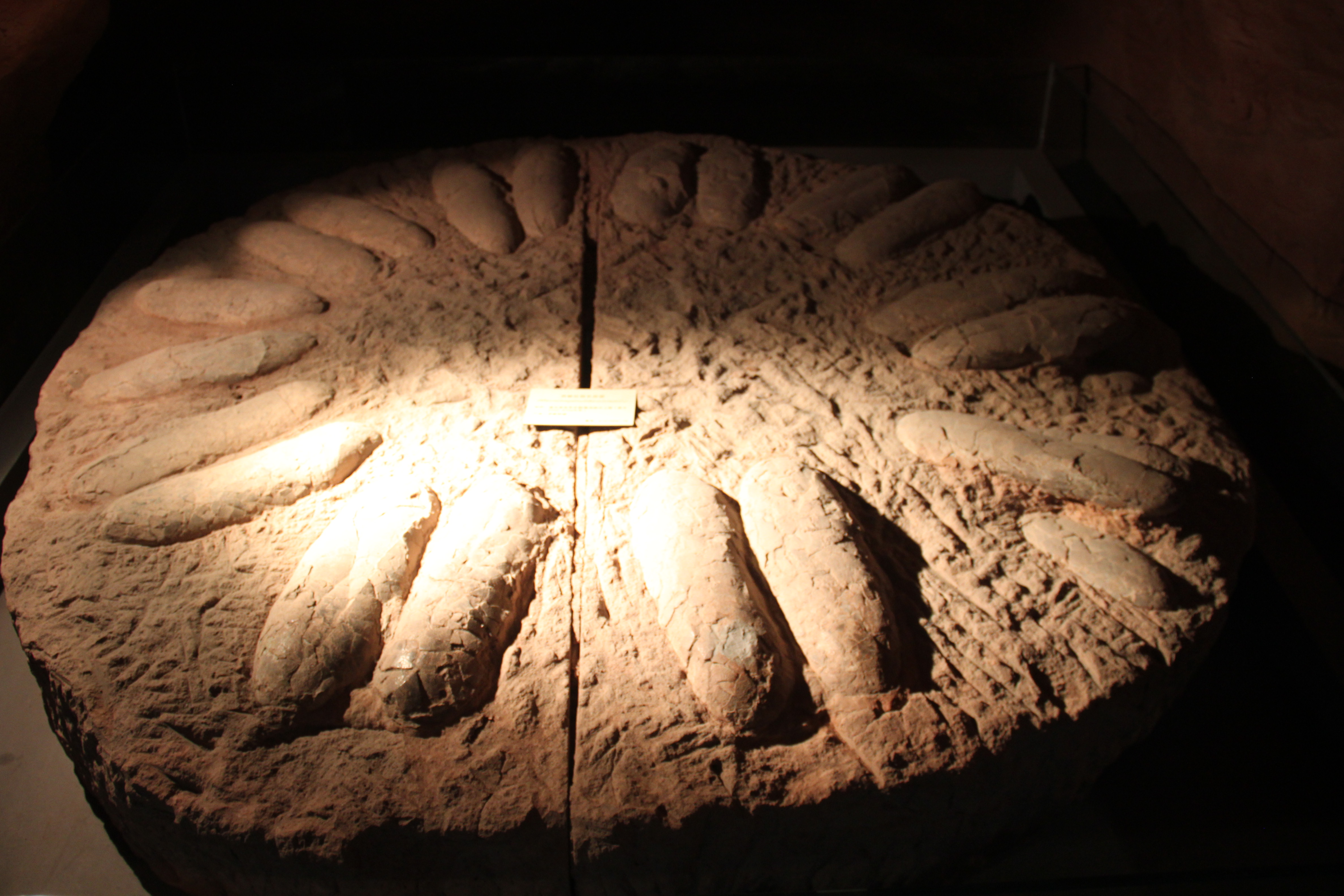
Fossilized Macroelongatoolithus nest from Zhengzhou, featuring the large center region devoid of eggs

The existence of giant oviraptorosaurians, such as Gigantoraptor, explains several earlier Asian finds of very large, up to ~50 cm (20 in) long, oviraptorosaurian eggs, assigned to the oospecies Macroelongatoolithus carlylensis. These were laid in enormous rings with a diameter of three metres. The presence of Macroelongatoolithus in North America indicates that gigantic oviraptorosaurs were present there as well, though no fossil skeletal remains have been found. The 2017 description and naming of Beibeilong—based on an embryonic individual associated with eggs—further supports that Macroelongatoolithus eggs and nests belong to colossal caenagnathid oviraptorosaurs, such as Gigantoraptor.

In 2018, Kohei Tanaka and team examined the egg clutches of numerous oviraptorosaur specimens, including egg clutches of Macroelongatoolithus, in order to correlate the nest configuration and body size to incubation behaviour. Their results showed that eggshell porosity indicates that the eggs of almost certainly all oviraptorosaurs were exposed in the nest without an external covering. Though most oviraptorosaur nests have eggs arranged in a circular fashion, the morphology of the nest is different in smaller and larger species in that the center of the nest is highly reduced in the former species, and becomes significantly larger in the latter species. This nest configuration suggest that whereas smallest oviraptorosaurs probably sat directly on the eggs, a large, Gigantoraptor-sized animal likely sat on the area devoid of eggs. Tanaka and colleagues pointed out that this adaption was beneficial to avoid egg-crushing and could have allowed some body contact during incubation in these giant oviraptorosaurs.

== Paleoenvironment ==
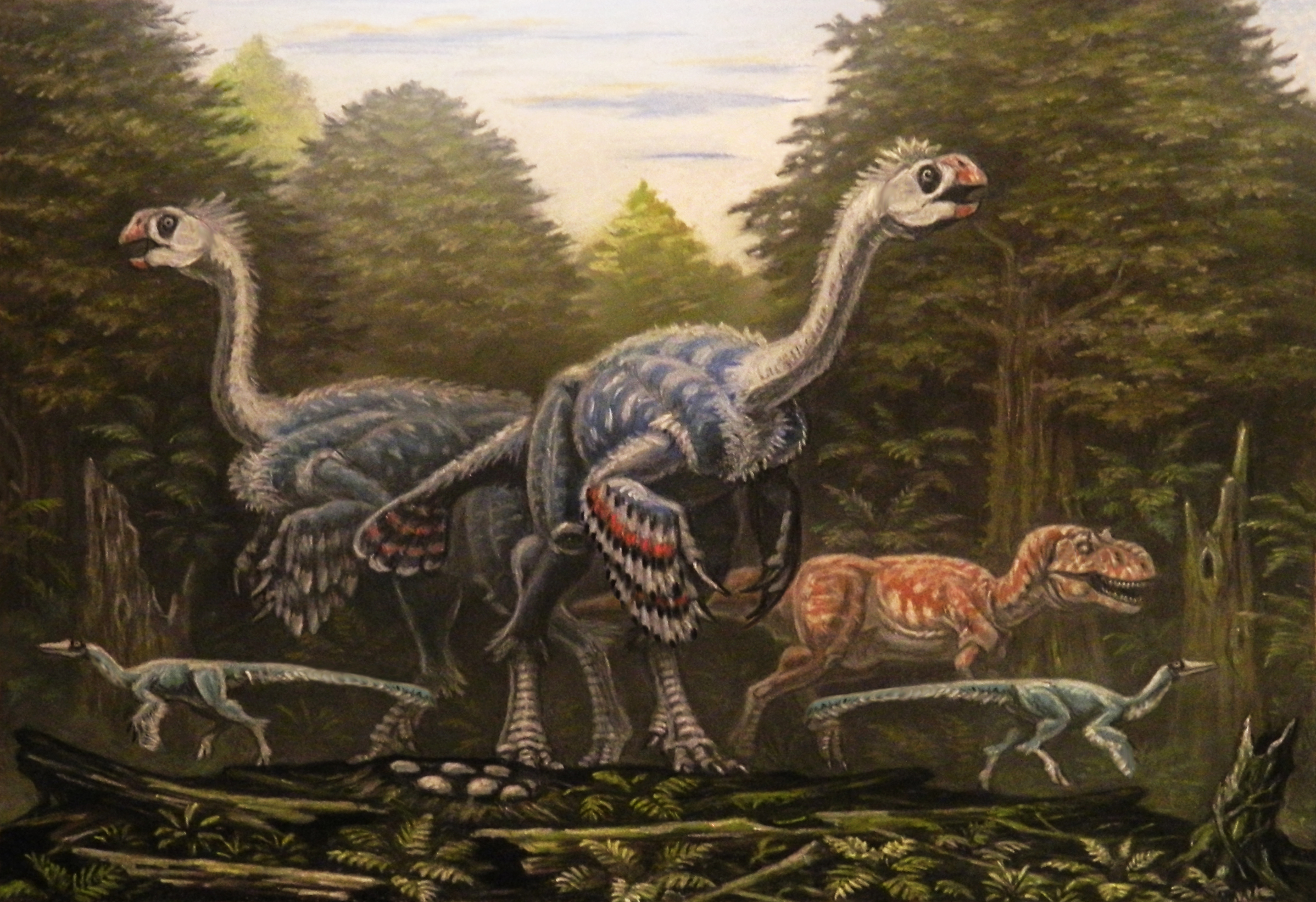
Restoration of a Gigantoraptor pair protecting their nest from two Archaeornithomimus and an Alectrosaurus

Gigantoraptor is known from the Iren Dabasu Formation of Inner Mongolia. This formation has been dated to 95.8 ± 6.2 million years ago based on U–Pb and stratigraphic analyses. A 2022 study describing new ornithomimosaurian material, however, suggested that while the vertebrate faunal assemblage indicates that the age of the formation is likely Turonian based on its similarity to the Bissekty Formation of Uzbekistan, the invertebrate faunal assemblage indicates a much later age (Campanian-Maastrichtian). Thomas Holtz suggested that it was around 95 to 80 million years ago.

The environments around this formation were highly humid, existing as a large braided river valley with floodplains. A semi-arid climate is also indicated by caliche-based sedimentation. The Iren Dabasu Formation had extensive vegetation and foliage, evidenced in the paleosol development, the numerous herbivorous dinosaurs remains that were found in both the river channel and the floodplain sediments. A rich diversity of charophytes and ostracods inhabited the floodplain systems.

The dinosaurian fauna of this formation includes the fast-running tyrannosauroid Alectrosaurus, the ornithomimosaur Archaeornithomimus, the therizinosaurids Erliansaurus and Neimongosaurus, the sauropod Sonidosaurus, and hadrosauroids Bactrosaurus and Gilmoreosaurus. Both Iren Dabasu and Bayan Shireh formations have been correlated on the basis of their similar vertebrate fossil record. This correlation may be further supported by the presence of a giant, Gigantoraptor-sized caenagnathid in the Bayan Shireh Formation. The presence of the Bayan Shireh caenagnathid and Gigantoraptor in fluvial-based sedimentation formations like the Iren Dabasu and Bayan Shireh formations suggest a preference over mesic habitats in giant oviraptorosaur species, rather than xeric habitats.

== See also ==
- Timeline of oviraptorosaur research
