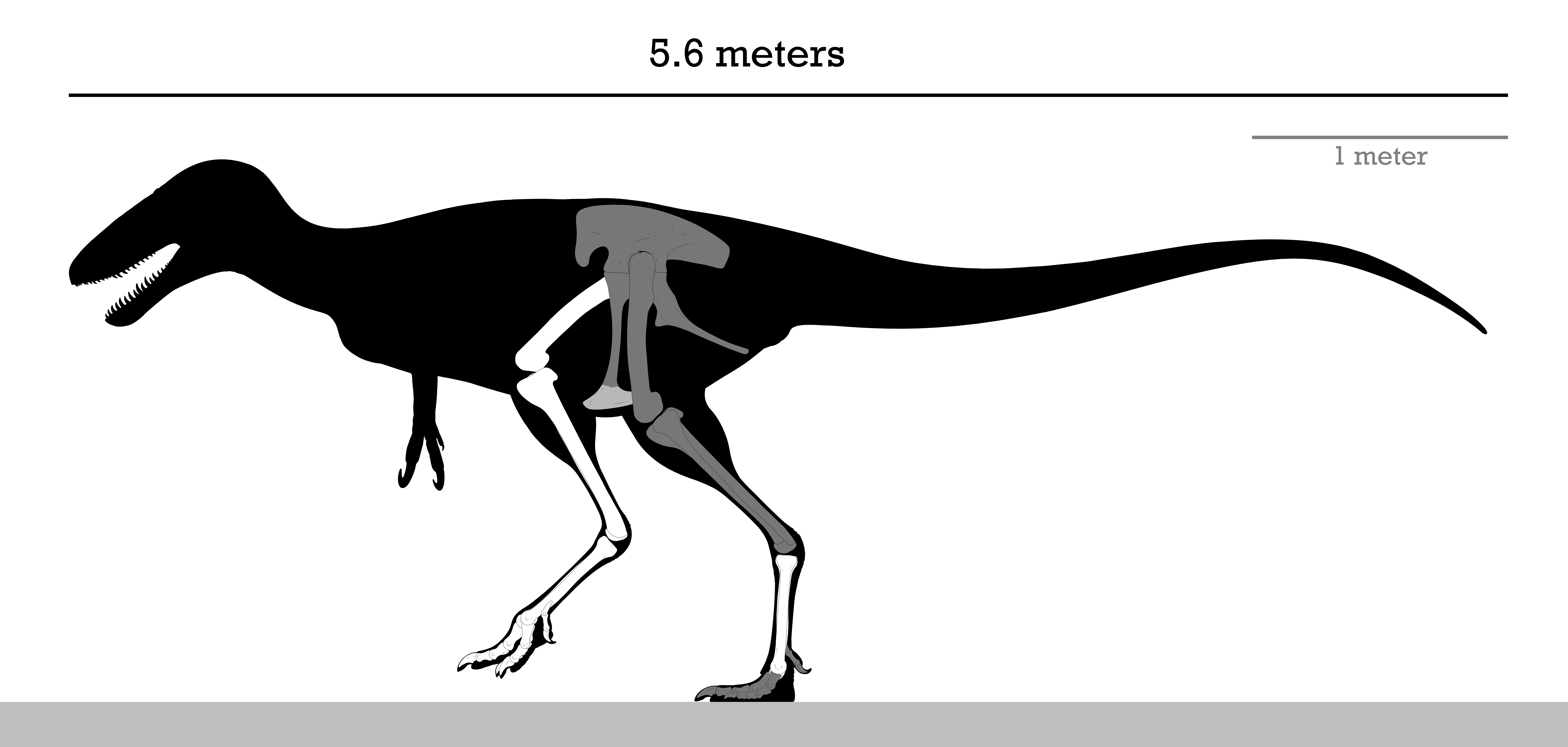
- Skeletal reconstruction of the holotype

Scientific classification
- Kingdom: Animalia
- Phylum: Chordata
- Class: Reptilia
- Clade: Dinosauria
- Clade: Saurischia
- Clade: Theropoda
- Superfamily: †Tyrannosauroidea
- Clade: †Pantyrannosauria
- Genus: †Alectrosaurus; Gilmore, 1933

Type species
- †Alectrosaurus olseni Gilmore, 1933

Synonyms
- Albertosaurus olseni (Gilmore, 1933) Paul, 1988

= Alectrosaurus =

Alectrosaurus Temporal range: Late Cretaceous, ~102–89.6 Ma

Extinct genus of dinosaurs

Alectrosaurus (/əˌlɛktroʊˈsɔːrəs/; meaning "alone lizard") is a genus of tyrannosauroid theropod dinosaur that lived in Asia during the Late Cretaceous period, about some 96 million years ago in what is now the Iren Dabasu Formation.

It was a medium-sized, moderately-built, ground-dwelling, bipedal carnivore, estimated at 5 to 6 m (16 to 20 ft) with a body shape similar to its much larger advanced relative, Tyrannosaurus. Alectrosaurus was a very fast running tyrannosauroid as indicated by the elongated hindlimbs that likely filled the niche of a pursuit predator, a trait that seems to be lost by the advanced and robust tyrannosaurids, in adulthood.

== Discovery and naming ==
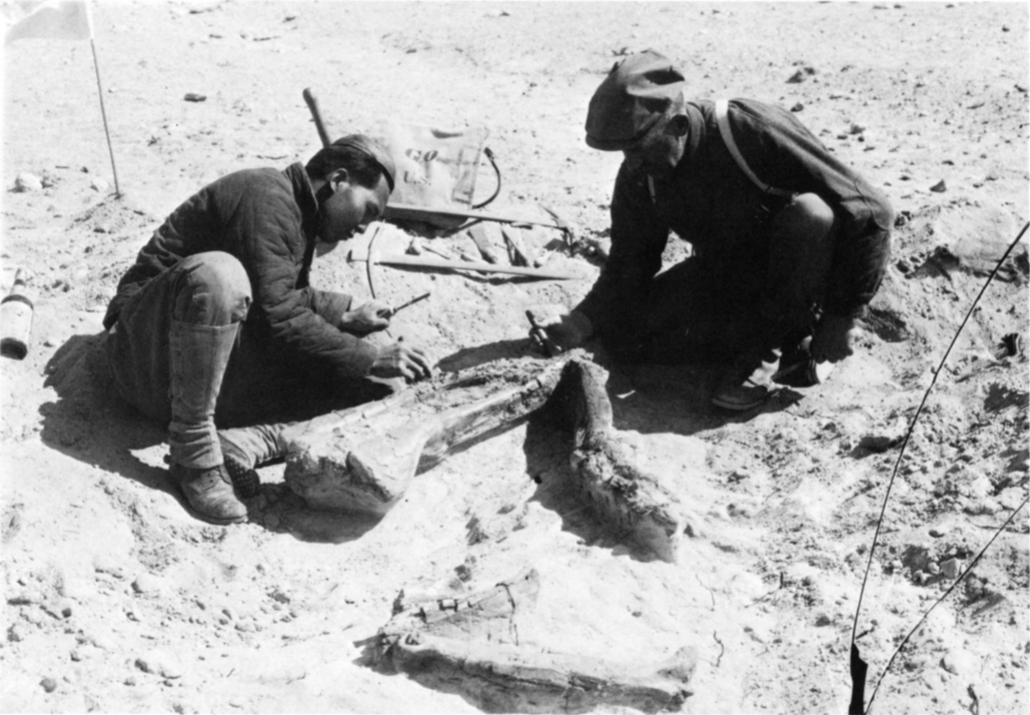
Excavation of the right hindlimb of A. olseni specimen AMNH 6554, in 1923. George Olsen on the right

In 1923, the Third Asiatic Expedition of the American Museum of Natural History, led by chief paleontologist Walter W. Granger, was hunting for dinosaur fossils in Mongolia. On April 25 in the gobi desert, assistant paleontologist George Olsen excavated and recovered the holotype AMNH FARB 6554, a nearly complete right hindlimb. This included a virtually complete right hindlimb with some elements from the left pes and two manual unguals. On May 4, Olsen discovered another specimen approximately 30 m (98.4 ft) away from his first find, catalogued as AMNH 6368. This specimen included a right humerus, two incomplete manual digits, four fragmentary caudal vertebrae, and other two or three unspecified elements that were discarded due to bad preservation. These discoveries were made at the Iren Dabasu Formation in what is now the Inner Mongolia Autonomous Region (Nei Mongol Zizhiqu) of China.

Both genus and species were formally described and named by the American paleontologist Charles Gilmore in 1933. The generic name, Alectrosaurus, can be translated as "alone lizard" or "mateless lizard", derived from the Greek words ἄλεκτρος (meaning alone or unmarried) and σαῦρος (meaning lizard). The specific name, olseni, is in honor of George Olsen, who discovered the first specimens.

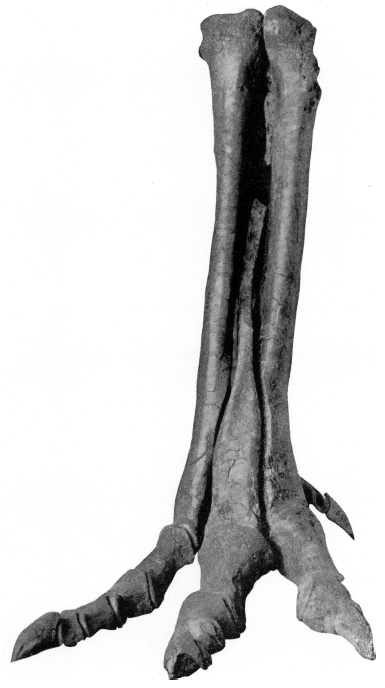
Holotype right pes of A. olseni, American Museum of Natural History

Near the holotype, the specimen AMNH FARB 6266 was found in the same strata but at different points also in 1923. It consists of premaxillary and lateral teeth, incomplete left lacrimal, maxillary process of the left jugal, partial right quadratojugal, jugal process of the right ectopterygoid and the quadrate ramus to the right pterygoid. Although the specimen seems to represent a smaller individual, its affinity to Alectrosaurus is somewhat unresolved since the specimen lacks hindlimb material, making direct comparisons with Alectrosaurus quite complicated.

=== Formerly assigned material ===
In 1977, the Mongolian paleontologist Altangerel Perle described two possible additional specimens from the Bayanshiree Formation of Mongolia. The specimen MPC-D 100/50 consists of a partial maxilla, scapulocoracoid and manual ungual, and specimen 'MPC-D 100/51 consists of a fragmentary skull with lower jaws and other elements, incomplete ilium, and metatarsals of the right foot. In 2012, an isolated frontal of a tyrannosauroid, MPC-D 102/4, was reported from the same formation, specifically in the Tsagan Teg locality. In 2022, Thomas Carr noted that these specimens may not be referable to Alectrosaurus, because of some tyrannosaurid traits found in the Mongolian specimens which the holotype does not possess. In 2025, the three specimens were redescribed as a new genus and species of tyrannosauroid, Khankhuuluu mongoliensis.

== Description ==
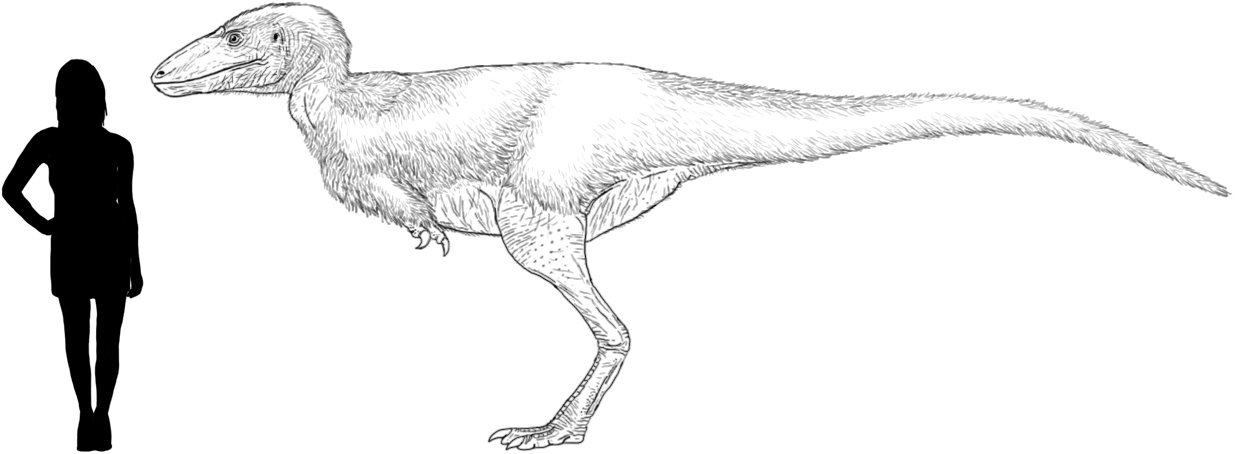
Life restoration, based on the holotype specimen

The lectotype AMNH 6554 is fragmentary, consisting of a nearly complete right hindlimb only lacking the distal tarsal elements; left metatarsals II, III and IV, and a fragmentary distal foot of a pubis, however it is unknown which pubis represents.

It was a medium-sized tyrannosauroid, reaching a length between 5 and 6 m (16 and 20 ft), and a weight ranging from 454 to 907 kg (1,001 to 2,000 lb). Overall, the hindlimbs were rather gracile, in contrast to the robust tyrannosaurids. The length of its tibia (shinbone) and femur (thighbone) are very close, in contrast to the majority of other tyrannosauroids, where the tibia is longer. The femur measures 72.7 cm (727 mm) and the tibia 73 cm (730 mm). The metatarsals are also closer in size to the tibia than in most other tyrannosauroids, where they are usually longer; the third is the largest, measuring 48 cm (480 mm) long. The astragalus and calcaneum are nicely preserved, although the astragalus seems to be slightly damaged. They are strongly attached, but not fused.

=== Distinguishing anatomical features ===
Following the original description of Alectrosaurus, it can be distinguished by the following traits: long slender-limbed type of tyrannosauroid; humerus long and slender; ungual and phalanx of digit I robust, laterally compressed and strongly curved; femur and tibia subequal in length; length of astragalus onefourth the combined length of astragalus and tibia.

According to Carr (2022), Alectrosaurus can be distinguished based on unique traits present in the hindlimbs, such as the spike-like process extending from the caudodorsal surface of the medial condyle of the femur, the presence of an abrupt expansion in length of the anterior margin of the joint surface for the tibia on the fibula, tendon pit adjacent to the ventrolateral buttress of the astragalus undercutting the medial surface of the buttress, the dorsal margin of the proximal surface of pedal phalanx II-2 is pointed, reduced pedal digit III, the lateral condyle of pedal phalanx III-1 is significantly deeper than the medial condyle, when in distal view, stocky pedal phalanx IV-2, when examined in proximal view, the dorsal half of the joint surface for metatarsal IV on metatarsal III is dilated anteriorly, and many others.

== Classification ==
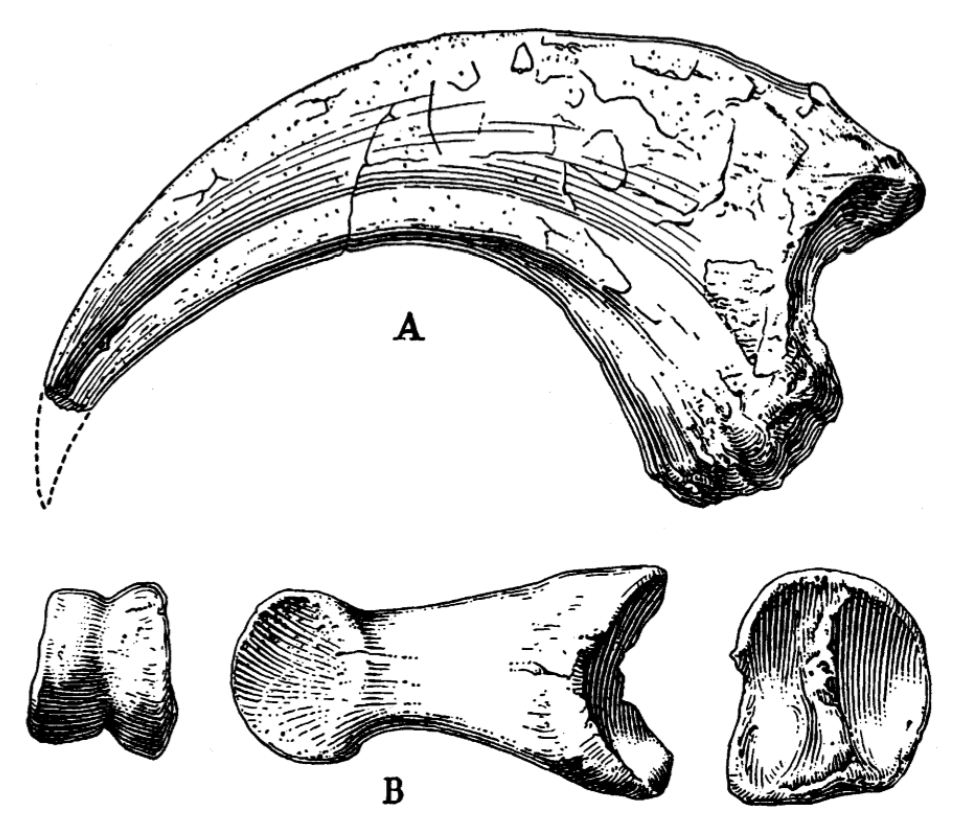
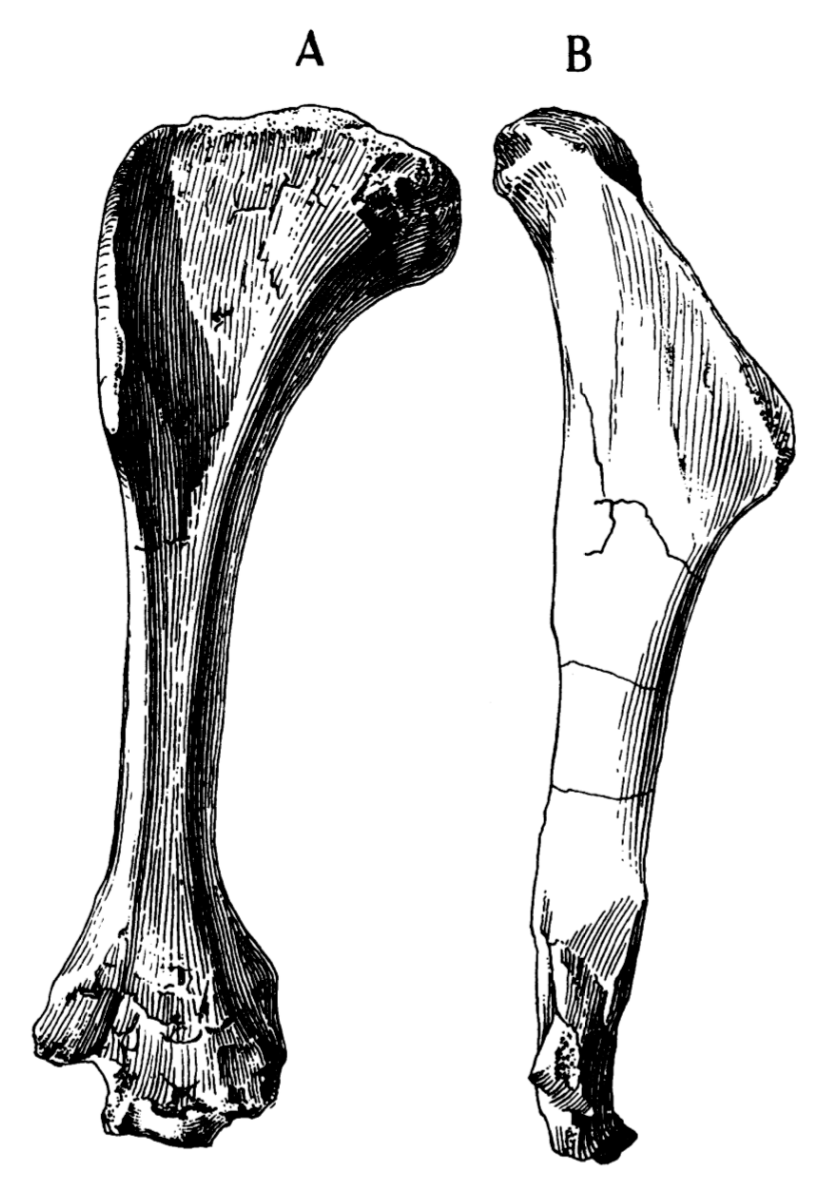
Ungual with phalanx, and right humerus of AMNH 6368 that were later confirmed to pertain to an unknown therizinosaur and not Alectrosaurus

In 1933, Charles Gilmore examined the available material and concluded that AMNH 6554 and AMNH 6368 were syntypes belonging to the same genus. He based this on his observation that the manual unguals from both specimens were morphologically similar. Observing similarities with the hindlimbs of specimen AMNH 5664 Gorgosaurus sternbergi, he classified this new genus as a "Deinodont", a term that is now considered equivalent to tyrannosaurid. Due to its fragmentary nature, there is presently very little confidence in restoring its relationships with other tyrannosauroids and many recent cladistic analyses have omitted it altogether. One study recovered Alectrosaurus at no less than eight equally parsimonious positions in a tyrannosauroid cladogram. Some paleontologists have equivocally considered Alectrosaurus olseni to be a species of Albertosaurus.

Alectrosaurus was originally characterized as a long-armed theropod, but Perle 1977 and Mader & Bradley 1989 observed that the forelimbs of the specimen AMNH 6368 did not belong to the genus, as they do not share characteristics with Tyrannosauroidea, and assigned them to the Therizinosauria incertae sedis. The remaining material, AMNH 6554 represents the hind limb with characteristics of a true tyrannosauroid, and were assigned as the lectotype for Alectrosaurus olseni. Additionally, four small caudal vertebrae were associated with the specimen AMNH 6368, the vertebrae were not included in the original description. Nevertheless, in 1984 they were catalogued as AMNH 21784. Mader and Bradley described these vertebrae, and were provisionally identified as caudal vertebrae of a small theropod dinosaur that is not phylogenetically referable to either the Tyrannosauroidea or Therizinosauridae as they show resemblance to the caudal vertebrae of Deinonychus and Plateosaurus.

The cladogram below displays the results of 2025 phylogenetic analysis by Voris and colleagues, recovering Khankhuuluu as diverging immediately after the roughly coeval Chinese Alectrosaurus, to which the remains were originally assigned:

- - - Juratyrant
    - Stokesosaurus
  - - Suskityrannus
    - - Xiongguanlong
      - - Timurlengia
        - - Alectrosaurus
          - - Khankhuuluu
            - Eutyrannosauria
              - Dryptosaurus
              - - Appalachiosaurus
                - Tyrannosauridae
                  ⊞
                  - - Albertosaurus
                    - Gorgosaurus
                  - - - Lythronax
                      - Teratophoneus
                    - - Bistahieversor
                      - - Nanuqsaurus
                        - - Thanatotheristes
                          - - - Daspletosaurus torosus
                              - Daspletosaurus horneri
                            - - Alioramini
                                - Alioramus spp.
                                - Qianzhousaurus
                              - Tyrannosaurini
                                - Zhuchengtyrannus
                                - - Tarbosaurus
                                  - Tyrannosaurus rex
                  ⊟

== Paleobiology ==
The hindlimb of the specimen AMNH 6554 is notable for the particular elongated digits and metatarsals, differing from other tyrannosauroids. These traits are found in terrestrial runner birds, suggesting that Alectrosaurus was suited as a fast-running tyrannosauroid dinosaur with well developed hindlimbs; probably a pursuit predator. This interpretation is consistent with the results obtained in the limb proportion analysis performed by Scott Persons IV and Currie in 2016. By comparing the limbs of numerous theropods they noted that most tyrannosauroids were highly cursorial and leggy animals, with the exception of giant and stocky-legged forms such as Tarbosaurus or Tyrannosaurus. Alectrosaurus was recovered with a relatively high CLP (Cursorial-limb-proportion) score at 16.5, higher than most carnosaurs. In 2001, a study conducted by Bruce Rothschild and colleagues, examined 23 foot bones referred to Alectrosaurus for signs of stress fractures, but none were found.

== Paleoenvironment ==
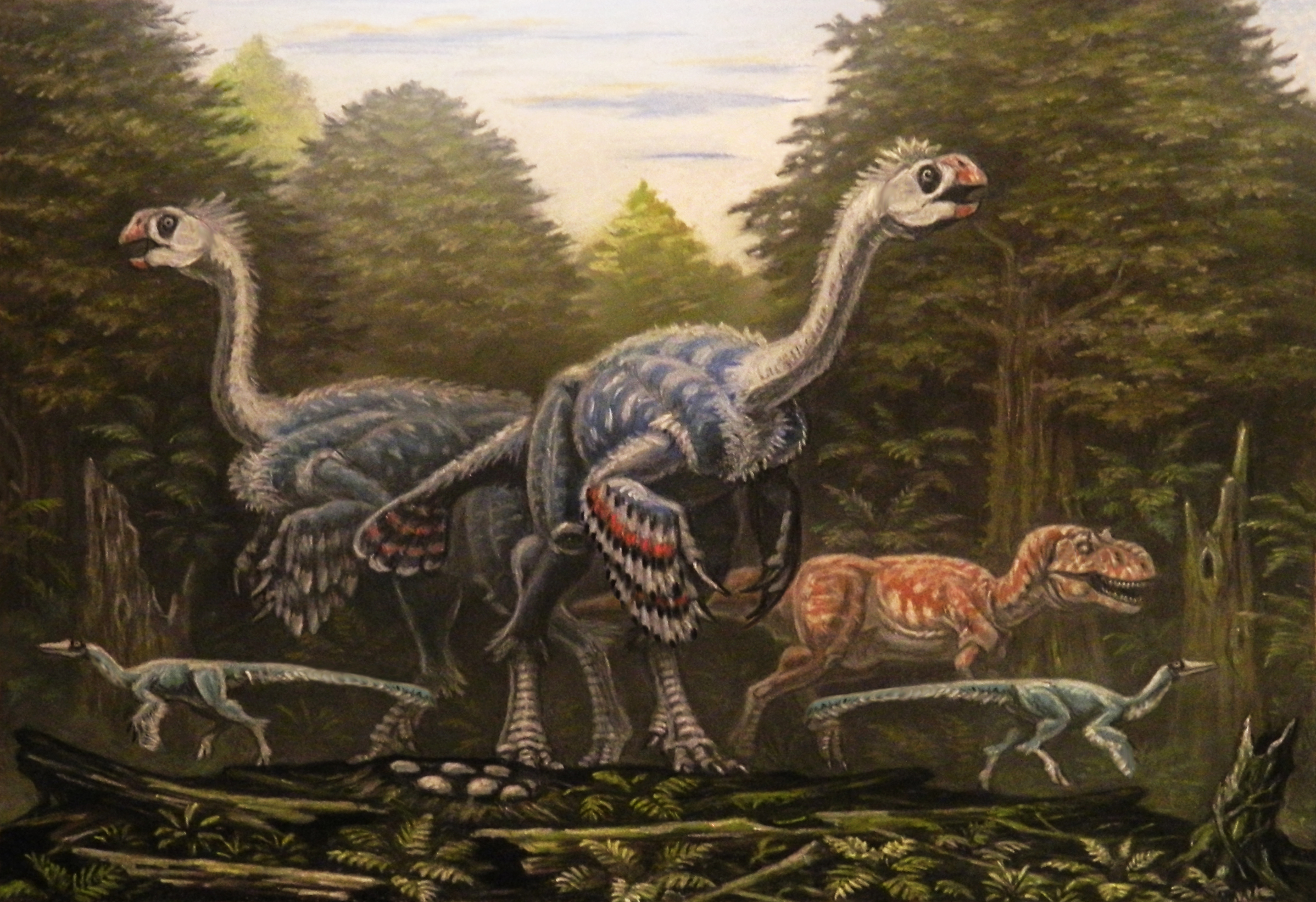
Restoration of two Gigantoraptors protecting their nest from two Archaeornithomimus and an Alectrosaurus

Alectrosaurus was first recovered from the Late Cretaceous Iren Dabasu Formation, the age of which is uncertain. In 2005, van Itterbeeck et al. suggested that the Iren Dabasu Formation is probably Campanian-Maastrichtian in age and possibly correlated with the Nemegt Formation. In 2018, the Iren Dabasu Formation has been dated to the Cenomanian stage, about 95.8 ± 6.2 million years ago. During the Late Cretaceous, there was a large floodplain with braided fluvial environments in the formation. The floodplain environments had extensive vegetation, evidenced in the palaeosol development and the numerous herbivorous dinosaurs that were found in both the river channel and the floodplain sediments. Contemporaneous paleofauna from this formation included other theropods such as Archaeornithomimus, Caenagnathasia, Erliansaurus, Gigantoraptor and Neimongosaurus; the sauropod Sonidosaurus and the two hadrosauroids Bactrosaurus and Gilmoreosaurus. Alectrosaurus likely preyed on these two.

== See also ==
- Timeline of tyrannosaur research
- Iren Dabasu Formation
- 1933 in paleontology
- Khankhuuluu
