= Iren Dabasu Formation =

Stratigraphic Unit in Inner Mongolia

- Stratigraphic range: Late Cretaceous
- Type: Geological formation
- Overlies: Arshanto Formation
- Area: Erenhot (Erlian) city
- Thickness: Up to 500 m (1,600 ft)

Lithology
- Primary: Sandstone, claystone, siltstone
- Other: Glutenite

Location
- Coordinates: 43.8°N 112.4°E
- Approximate paleocoordinates: 43.1°N 101.0°E
- Region: Inner Mongolia
- Country: China
- Extent: Erlian Basin

Type section
- Named for: Iren Dabasu
- Named by: Osborn
- Year defined: 1922
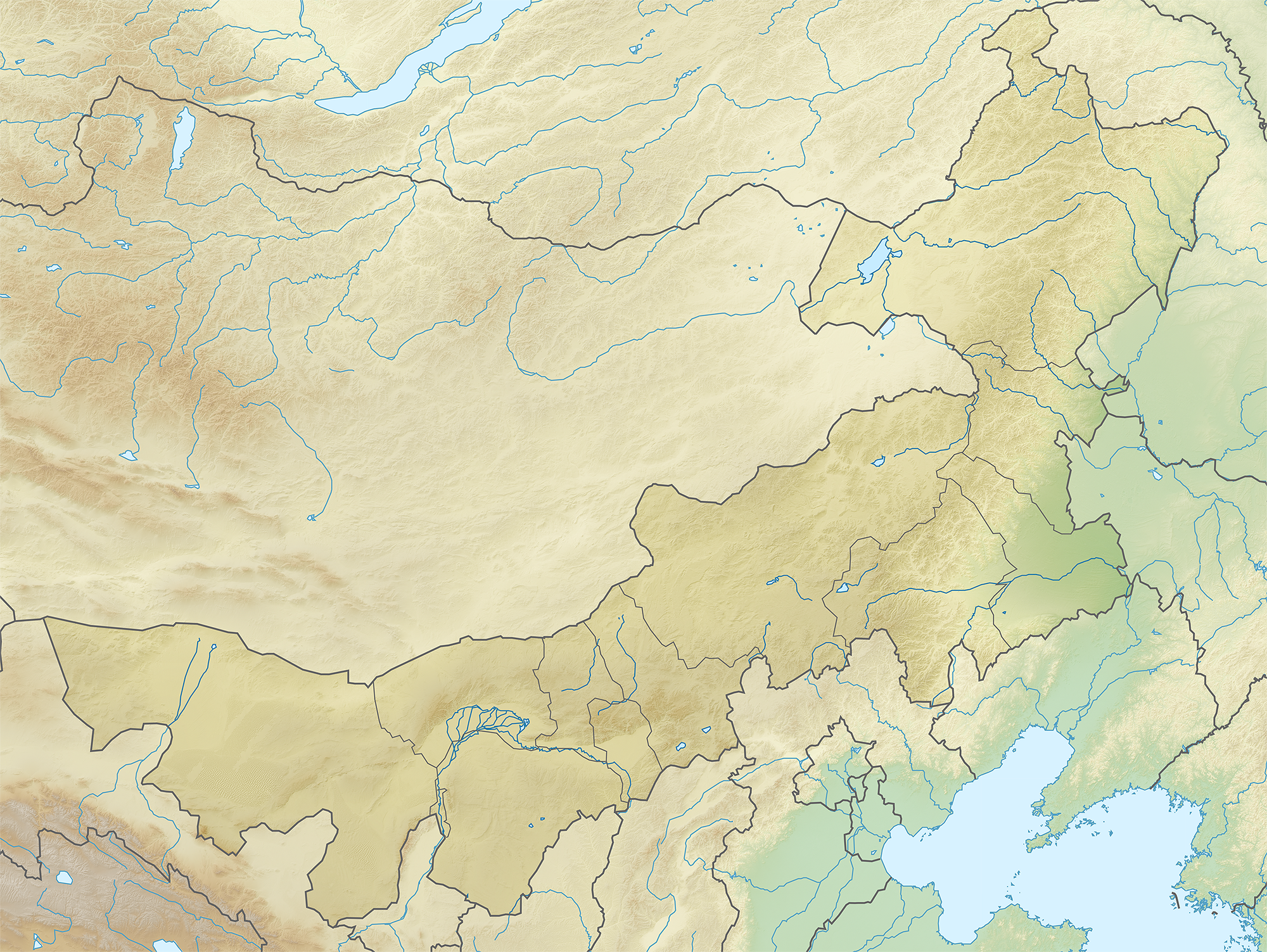
- Iren Dabasu Formation (China) Iren Dabasu Formation (Inner Mongolia)

The Iren Dabasu Formation (also known as Erlian Formation) is a Late Cretaceous geologic formation in the Iren Nor region of Inner Mongolia. Dinosaur remains diagnostic to the genus level are among the fossils that have been recovered from the formation. The formation was first described and defined by Henry Fairfield Osborn in 1922 and it is located in the Iren Nor region of China.

== Geology ==
It comprises continental clastic sediments consisting of light grey fine sandstones, coarse sandstones and glutenites as well as mottled claystones and siltstones. The fine-grained floodplain sediments and the coarse-grained sediments of the point bar formed a series of repeated frequently binary sedimentary rhythms. The "binary structure" of the sedimentary rhythms strongly indicates meandering stream deposits rather than braided river deposits as previously thought. As indicated by the fluvial and lacustrine sedimentation, the Iren Dabasu Formation was a large floodplain terrain with braided rivers and meanders that supported extensive vegetation, evidenced on the prominent palaeosol development and the numerous remains from herbivorous dinosaurs. Egg nests, caliche and paleosols seem to indicate periodic subaerial intervals, in addition, the presence of plesiosaur and hybodont shark remains (which are also known in the Bayan Shireh Formation) are indicatives of a river system with connections to the ocean.

== Correlations ==
Based on the ostracod and charophyte assemblages of the Iren Dabasu Formation, Itterbeeck et al. 2005 suggested a potential correlation with those of the Nemegt Formation, making its age Late Campanian to Early Maastrichtian. However, vertebrates point to an older date than the Campanian-Maastrichtian ages, the supposed deposition of ostracods were likely due to climatic conditions rather than age. The turtle Khunnuchelys is known from both Iren Dabasu and Bayan Shireh equivalent units such as the Bostobe and Bissekty. In addition, a giant caenagnathid similar to Gigantoraptor is now known from the Bayan Shireh Formation at the locality of Tsagan Teg. Like the coeval Bayan Shireh Formation (and possibly Javkhlant Formation) in the Gobi Desert, the dinosaur fauna of the Iren Dabasu Formation includes tyrannosauroids, ornithomimids, therizinosaurs and oviraptorosaurs.

However, strong evidence coming from biostratigraphic occurrences seems to support a correlation with the Bayanshiree Formation, at least, with the upper boundary. For instance, both formations bear similar dinosaur taxa, such as therizinosaurs (Erlikosaurus, Segnosaurus, Erliansaurus or Neimongosaurus) and ornithomimosaurs (Garudimimus or Archaeornithomimus), these similarities are even more intensified by the discovery of Gigantoraptor and the giant unnamed caenagnathid from Bayan Shireh. In addition, the potential discovery of Alectrosaurus in both formations seemed to be another indicative of a correlation, though the tyrannosauroid specimens from the Bayanshiree Formation were subsequently redescribed as Khankhuuluu. Consequently, Averianov and Sues estimated the formation to be Santonian in age, roughly about 86 million and 83 million years ago. However, palynological correlations suggest a Maastrichtian age. Guo et al. 2018 supported a Late Cretaceous age based on U–Pb and paleomagnetic analyses, with a maximum depositional age of around 95.8 ± 6.2 million years ago. A 2022 study describing new ornithomimosaurian material, however, suggested that while the vertebrate faunal assemblage indicates that the age of the formation is likely Turonian based on its similarity to the Bissekty Formation of Uzbekistan, the invertebrate faunal assemblage indicates a much later age (Campanian-Maastrichtian).

== Fossil content ==
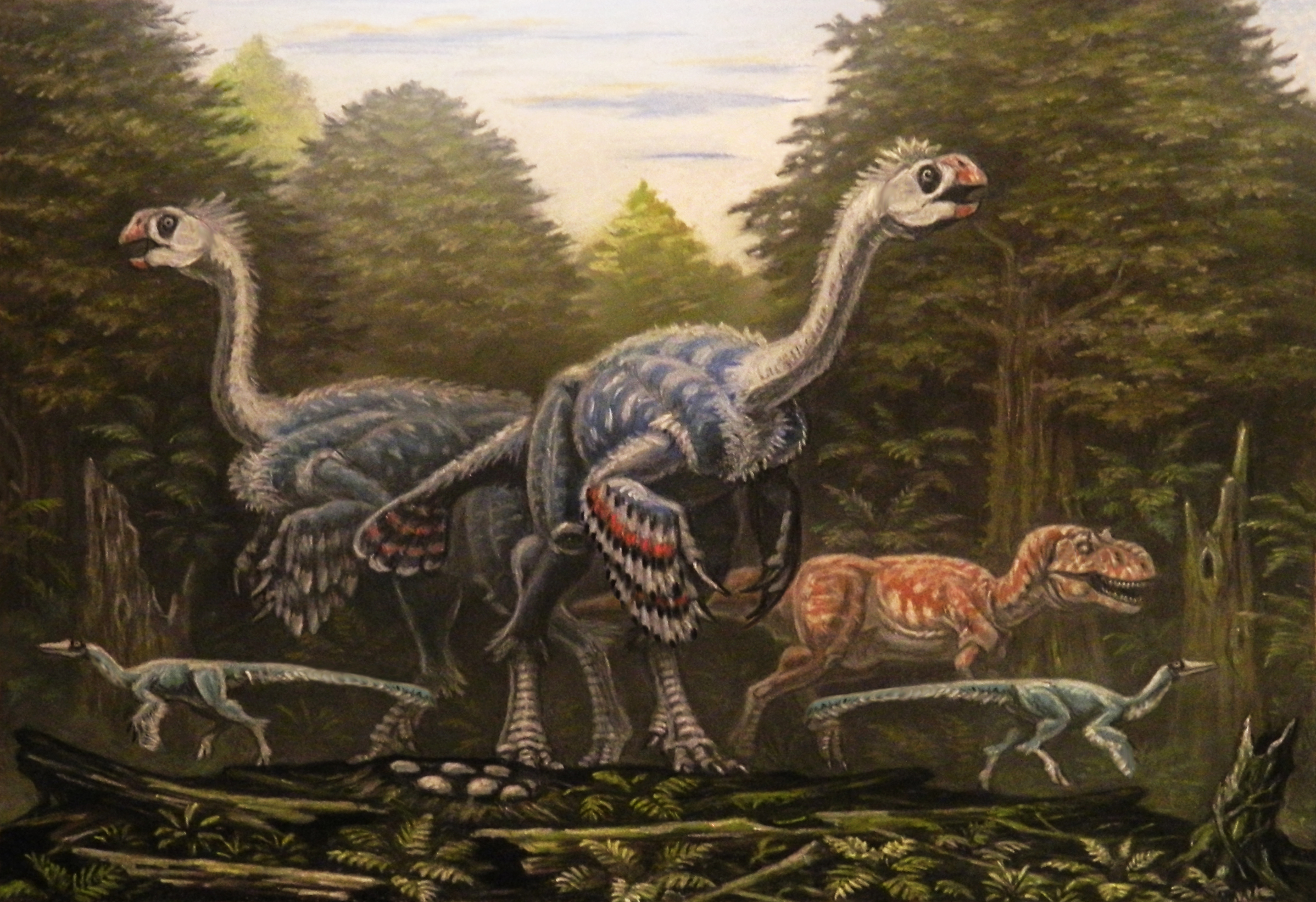
Dinosaurs of Iren Dabasu Formation

The Iren Dabasu Formation is rich on dinosaur fauna, with multiple species described, in the other hand, mammals seem to be extremely absent. Compared, the fossil taxa between Iren Dabasu and Bayan Shireh are very similar, most notably therizinosaurs, tyrannosauroids, oviraptorosaurs and turtles. Although Gigantoraptor is the only described oviraptorosaur from the formation, Funston et al. 2019 described a new avimimid bonebed containing numerous individuals at different growth stages. Nevertheless, the fossils lacked enough diagnosis to be confined to a separate genus and species. Deinonychosaurs are not very common across the formation, however an indeterminate troodontid about the size of Saurornithoides is known from three isolated specimens. An isolated humerus of a pterosaur has also been found in this formation.

| Color key: Taxon / Reclassified taxon / Taxon falsely reported as present / Dubious taxon or junior synonym / Ichnotaxon / Ootaxon / Morphotaxon | Notes; Uncertain or tentative taxa are in small text; ~~crossed out~~ taxa are discredited. |

=== Reptiles ===
==== Dinosaurs ====
===== Indeterminate Dinosaurs =====
Indeterminate Dinosaurs reported from the Iren Dabasu Formation
| Genus | Species | Location | Stratigraphic Position | Material | Notes |
|---|---|---|---|---|---|
| Dinosauria | Indeterminate | | | Five isolated vertabrae | |

===== Ornithopods =====
Ornithopods reported from the Iren Dabasu Formation
| Genus | Species | Location | Stratigraphic Position | Material | Notes | Images |
|---|---|---|---|---|---|---|
| Bactrosaurus | B. johnsoni | | | "Cranial and postcranial material represented by more than eight specimens." | A hadrosauroid. | |
| Gilmoreosaurus | G. mongoliensis | | | "Partial cranial and postcranial elements represented by more than ten specimens". | A hadrosauroid originally identified as Mandschurosaurus. | |
| Spheroolithus | S. irenensis | | | "Egg fossils." | Eggs shells attributed to Spheroolithus. | |

===== Sauropods =====
Sauropods reported from the Iren Dabasu Formation
| Genus | Species | Location | Stratigraphic Position | Material | Notes | Images |
|---|---|---|---|---|---|---|
| Sonidosaurus | S. saihangaobiensis | | | "Numerous cervical, dorsal and caudal vertebrae and some postcranial elements." | A titanosaur. | |

===== Theropods =====
Ornithomimosaurians

Ornithomimosaurians reported from the Iren Dabasu Formation
| Taxon | Species | Location | Stratigraphic Position | Material | Notes | Images |
|---|---|---|---|---|---|---|
| Archaeornithomimus | A. asiaticus | | | "Partial manus, metatarsus, vertebrae, limb elements." | An ornithomimosaur originally identified as Ornithomimus. | |
| Ornithomimosauria | Indeterminate | | | "A pelvis and sacrum." | Likely distinct from Archaeornithomimus asiaticus, probably representing an early-diverging group within Ornithomimosauria. | |
| Ornithomimosauria | Indeterminate | | | Vertabral Axis | May represent a juvinile individual | |

Oviraptorosaurs

Oviraptorosaurs reported from the Iren Dabasu Formation
| Taxon | Species | Location | Stratigraphic Position | Material | Notes | Images |
|---|---|---|---|---|---|---|
| Avimimidae spp. | Indeterminate | | | "Vertebrae and postcranial elements represented by at least six individuals." | Avimimids at different growth stages. | |
| Caenagnathasia | Indeterminate | | | "Beak from lower jaws." | An oviraptorosaur. | |
| Gigantoraptor | G. erlianensis | | | "Lower jaws and much of the postcranial elements with very elongated hindlimbs." | A giant oviraptorosaur. | |

Therizinosaurs

Therizinosaurs reported from the Iren Dabasu Formation
| Taxon | Species | Location | Stratigraphic Position | Material | Notes | Images |
|---|---|---|---|---|---|---|
| Erliansaurus | E. bellamanus | | | "Cervical vertebrae and postcranial elements." | A therizinosauroid. | |
| Neimongosaurus | N. yangi | | | "Two specimens with most of the axial column, many limb and girdle elements, and a partial dentary." | A therizinosauroid. | |
| Therizinosauridae | Indeterminate | | | "Right humerus with a phalanx and ungual." | A therizinosaurid similar to Segnosaurus and initially attributed to Alectrosaurus olseni. | |

Troodonts

Troodonts reported from the Iren Dabasu Formation
| Taxon | Species | Location | Stratigraphic Position | Material | Notes | Images |
|---|---|---|---|---|---|---|
| Troodontidae | Indeterminate | | | "Right and left metatarsals represented by three specimens similar in size to Saurornithoides." | A troodontid. | |
| Urbacodon | U. norelli | | | A partial right dentary and associated teeth | A troodontid. | Urbacodon norelli |
| Troodontidae | Indeterminate | | | A single vertabrae | | |

Tyrannosaurs

Tyrannosaurs reported from the Iren Dabasu Formation
| Taxon | Species | Location | Stratigraphic Position | Material | Notes | Images |
|---|---|---|---|---|---|---|
| Alectrosaurus | A. olseni | | | "Virtually complete right hindlimb and left metatarsals." | A tyrannosauroid. | |
| Tyrannosauridae | Indeterminate | | | "75 fragments, which include premaxillary and lateral teeth, a fragmentary lacrimal, jugal, pterygoid, and ectopterygoid." | A juvenile tyrannosaurid that may be related to Timurlengia based on phylogenetic analysis, but detailed comparisons suggest it may be related to tyrannosaurines. | |

==== Testudines ====
Testudines reported from the Iren Dabasu Formation
| Genus | Species | Location | Stratigraphic Position | Material | Notes | Images |
|---|---|---|---|---|---|---|
| Testudines? | Indeterminate | | | A single vertabrae | | |

=== Flora ===
==== Angiosperms ====
Angiosperms reported from the Iren Dabasu Formation
| Genus | Species | Location | Stratigraphic Position | Material | Notes | Images |
|---|---|---|---|---|---|---|
| Aquillapollenites sp. | Indeterminate | | | "Pollen grain." | Angiosperm pollen. | |
| Buttinia sp. | Indeterminate | | | "Spores and pollen." | Angiosperm pollen. | |
| Cranwellia sp. | Indeterminate | | | "Pollen grain." | Angiosperm pollen. | |
| Momipites sp. | Indeterminate | | | "Pollen grain." | Angiosperm pollen. | |
| Normapolles sp. | Indeterminate | | | "Pollen grain." | Angiosperm pollen. | |
| Sabalpollenites sp. | Indeterminate | style="background:#D1FFCF;" | | | "Pollen grain." | Angiosperm pollen. | |
| Tricolpate-morph | Indeterminate | | | "Pollen grain." | Angiosperm palynomorph. | |
| Triporate-morph | Indeterminate | | | "Pollen grain." | Angiosperm palynomorph. | |
| Ulmideipites sp. | Indeterminate | | | "Pollen grain." | Angiosperm pollen. | |
| Ulmipollenites sp. | Indeterminate | | | "Spores and pollen." | Angiosperm pollen. | |

==== Gymnosperms ====
Gymnosperms reported from the Iren Dabasu Formation
| Genus | Species | Location | Stratigraphic Position | Material | Notes | Images |
|---|---|---|---|---|---|---|
| Bisaccate-morph | Indeterminate | | | "Spores and pollen." | Gymnosperm palynomorph. | |
| Cerebropollenites sp. | Indeterminate | | | "Pollen grain." | Gymnosperm pollen. | |
| Cheirolepidiacean-morph | Indeterminate | | | "Pollen grain." | Gymnosperm palynomorph. | |
| Ephedripites sp. | Indeterminate | | | "Spores and pollen." | Gymnosperm pollen. | |
| Exesipollenites sp. | Indeterminate | | | "Spores and pollen." | Gymnosperm pollen. | |
| Monosulcate-morph | Indeterminate | | | "Pollen grain." | Gymnosperm pollen. | |
| Taxodiaceaepollenites sp. | Indeterminate | | | "Pollen grain." | Gymnosperm pollen. | |

==== Spores ====
Spores reported from the Iren Dabasu Formation
| Genus | Species | Location | Stratigraphic Position | Material | Notes | Images |
|---|---|---|---|---|---|---|
| Cyathidites sp. | Indeterminate | | | "Spores and pollen grain." | Spore palynomorph. | |
| Ischyosporites sp. | Indeterminate | | | "Spores." | Spore palynomorph. | |
| Leptolepidites sp. | Indeterminate | | | "Spores." | Spore palynomorph. | |
| Triplanosporites sp. | Indeterminate | | | "Spores." | Spore palynomorph. | |

== See also ==
- List of dinosaur-bearing rock formations
- List of Asian dinosaurs
- Laurasia
- Geology of Mongolia
- Cretaceous Mongolia
