= Erlian =

Erlian may refer to:

- Erenhot, or Erlian, a city in Inner Mongolia, China
- King Erlian, a fictional character in The Chronicles of Narnia
