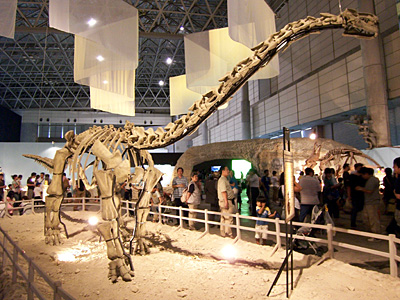
- Reconstructed skeleton

Scientific classification
- Kingdom: Animalia
- Phylum: Chordata
- Class: Reptilia
- Clade: Dinosauria
- Clade: Saurischia
- Clade: †Sauropodomorpha
- Clade: †Sauropoda
- Clade: †Macronaria
- Clade: †Titanosauria
- Clade: †Lithostrotia
- Genus: †Sonidosaurus
- Species: †S. saihangaobiensis

Binomial name
- †Sonidosaurus saihangaobiensis Xu et al., 2006

= Sonidosaurus =

Sonidosaurus Temporal range: Late Cretaceous (Turonian – Santonian) 93.9–83.6 Ma

Extinct genus of dinosaurs

Sonidosaurus (meaning "Sonid lizard", after Sonid, the large geographical area that includes the type locality) is a genus of sauropod dinosaur from the Late Cretaceous. It was a titanosaur which lived in what is now Inner Mongolia. The type species, Sonidosaurus saihangaobiensis, was described by Xu, Zhang, Tan, Zhao, and Tan in 2006. It was a small titanosaur, about 9 meters (30 ft) long. It was first discovered in the Saihangaobi, Iren Dabasu (Erlian) Formation, in 2001 in a quarry which would later yield the remains of Gigantoraptor.

== Classification ==
Sonidosaurus exhibits a combination of derived characteristics of titanosaurs and plesiomorphic features suggesting a more basal position. It shares several similarities with some other Asian titanosaurs, such as Opisthocoelicaudia, suggesting possible close affinities. In a 2017 review of Asian titanosaurs, Sonidosaurus was considered a lithostrotian titanosaur, with possible saltasaurid affinities. In particular, it shared with saltasaurids and the Bor Guve titanosaur a posterior centrodiapophyseal lamina on its dorsal vertebrae.

== Paleoenvironment ==
Sonidosaurus in the only known sauropod of the Iren Dabasu Fauna. The largest theropods that shared habitat with Sonidosaurus were the oviraptorosaur Gigantoraptor and the tyrannosauroid Alectrosaurus. Gilmoreosaurus lived in the same place, it is the largest known ornithischian from the fauna.
