= Erenhot =

Erenhot 二连浩特市 • ᠡᠷᠢᠶᠡᠡ ᠬᠣᠲᠠ Erlianhaote, Erh-lien-hao-t'e
- County-level & Sub-prefectural city
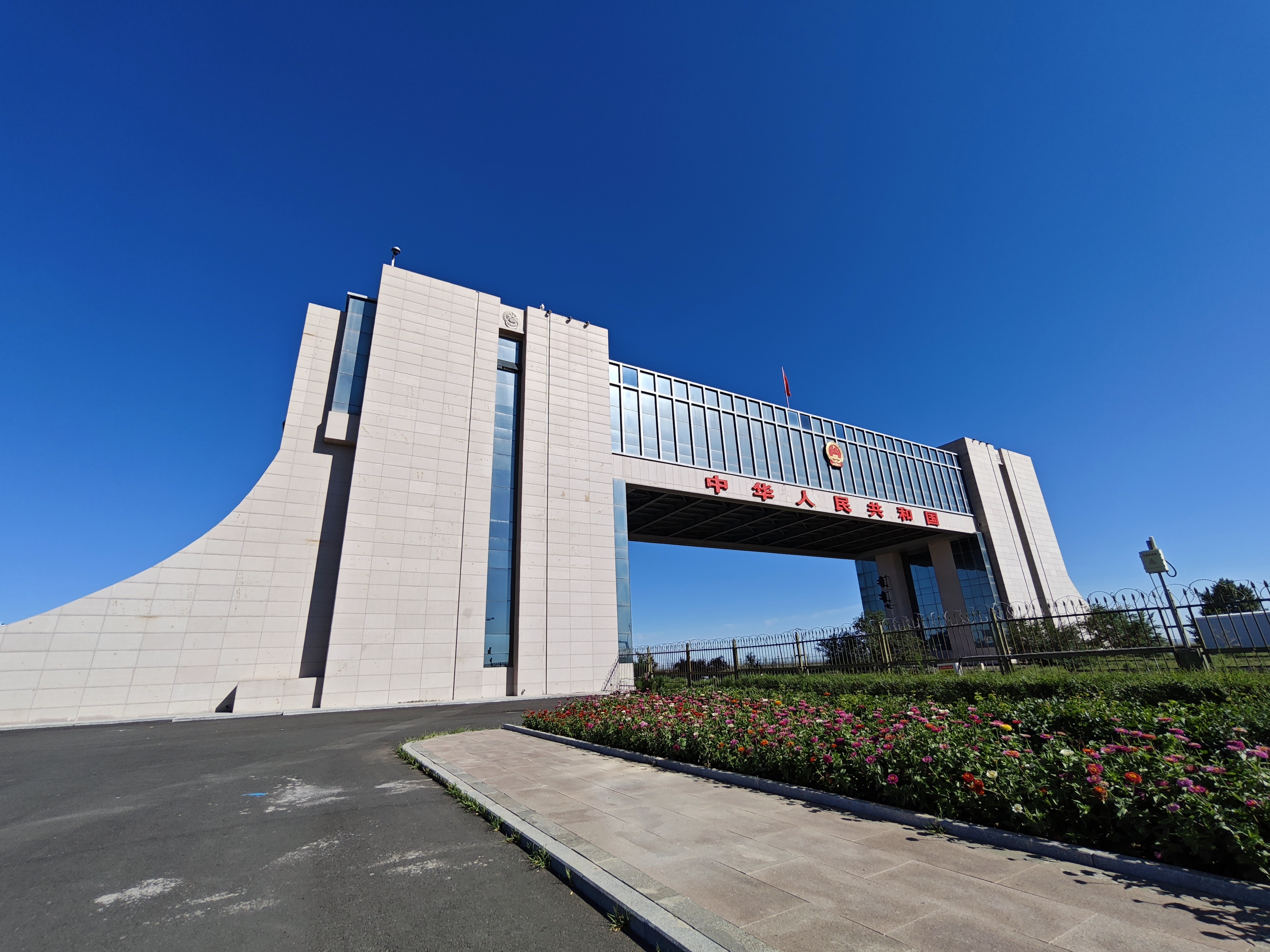
- Erenhot Port National Gate

- Location in Inner Mongolia Erenhot (China)
- Coordinates: 43°39′N 111°59′E
- Country: China
- Autonomous region: Inner Mongolia
- League: Xilingol

Area
  - County-level & Sub-prefectural city: 4,015.0 km^{2} (1,550.2 sq mi)
  - Urban: 48.78 km^{2} (18.83 sq mi)
- Elevation: 963 m (3,159 ft)

Population (2020)
  - County-level & Sub-prefectural city: 75,794
  - Density: 18.878/km^{2} (48.893/sq mi)
  - Urban: 75,200
- Time zone: UTC+08:00 (China Standard)
- Postal code: 011100
- Area code: 0479
- Website: elht.gov.cn

Erenhot

Chinese name
- Simplified Chinese: 二连浩特
- Traditional Chinese: 二連浩特
Transcriptions
Standard Mandarin
- Hanyu Pinyin: Èrliánhàotè
Wu
- Romanization: nyi^{3}lie^{1}ghau^{2}deh^{4}
Yue: Cantonese
- Jyutping: ji^{6}lin^{4}hou^{6}dak^{6}

Mongolian name
- Mongolian Cyrillic: In China － ᠡᠷᠢᠶᠡᠡ ᠬᠣᠲᠠ (Eriyen hota) In Mongolia － Эрээн хот (Ereen khot)

Erenhot (Chinese: 二连浩特; pinyin: Èrliánhàotè; Mongolian: ᠡᠷᠢᠶᠡᠡ ᠬᠣᠲᠠ Эрээн хот, commonly shortened to Ereen or Erlian) is a county-level city under jurisdiction of the Xilingol League, Inner Mongolia, China, located in the Gobi Desert along the Sino-Mongolian border, across from the Mongolian town of Zamyn-Üüd. There are 74,197 inhabitants (2010 census) and the elevation is 966 metres (3,169 ft).

== Demographics ==
The proportion of nationalities in Erenhot City (2020)
Nationality	Percentage
Han	74.4%
Mongols	24.4%
Manchus	0.8%
Hui People	0.2%
Daur	0.1%
Others	0.1%
Source of the population statistics :

== Climate ==
Erenhot experiences a cold desert climate (Köppen BWk) with long, very dry, and bitter winters and short, hot summers. Monthly daily average temperatures range from −17.8 °C (0.0 °F) in January to 24.0 °C (75.2 °F) in July, with an annual mean of 4.61 °C (40.3 °F). The city receives 3,232 hours (about 73% of the possible total) of bright sunshine per year, and clear, sunny, dry weather dominates year-round; due to the aridity, the diurnal temperature variation frequently approaches and exceeds 15 °C (27 °F). Over two-thirds of the sparse 135 millimetres (5.3 in) of annual rainfall occurs from June to August alone. With monthly percent possible sunshine ranging from 67% in July to 78% in February, the city is one of the sunniest nationwide and receives 3,232 hours of bright sunshine annually.

Climate data for Erenhot, elevation 963 m (3,159 ft), (1991–2020 normals, extremes 1938–present)
Month	Jan	Feb	Mar	Apr	May	Jun	Jul	Aug	Sep	Oct	Nov	Dec	Year
Record high °C (°F)	11.0 (51.8)	15.2 (59.4)	24.8 (76.6)	32.5 (90.5)	37.3 (99.1)	39.2 (102.6)	42.6 (108.7)	39.9 (103.8)	36.7 (98.1)	29.3 (84.7)	21.9 (71.4)	10.2 (50.4)	42.6 (108.7)
Mean daily maximum °C (°F)	−9.8 (14.4)	−3.3 (26.1)	6.0 (42.8)	15.7 (60.3)	23.1 (73.6)	28.4 (83.1)	31.0 (87.8)	29.0 (84.2)	22.8 (73.0)	13.3 (55.9)	1.7 (35.1)	−7.8 (18.0)	12.5 (54.5)
Daily mean °C (°F)	−17.1 (1.2)	−11.6 (11.1)	−2.2 (28.0)	7.7 (45.9)	15.6 (60.1)	21.7 (71.1)	24.6 (76.3)	22.4 (72.3)	15.4 (59.7)	5.6 (42.1)	−5.5 (22.1)	−14.5 (5.9)	5.2 (41.3)
Mean daily minimum °C (°F)	−22.4 (−8.3)	−18 (0)	−9.2 (15.4)	0.2 (32.4)	7.9 (46.2)	14.6 (58.3)	18.1 (64.6)	16.0 (60.8)	8.8 (47.8)	−0.5 (31.1)	−10.8 (12.6)	−19.4 (−2.9)	−1.2 (29.8)
Record low °C (°F)	−40.0 (−40.0)	−37.2 (−35.0)	−31.1 (−24.0)	−17.8 (0.0)	−8.0 (17.6)	2.0 (35.6)	7.1 (44.8)	0.8 (33.4)	−7.2 (19.0)	−19.0 (−2.2)	−30.0 (−22.0)	−35.4 (−31.7)	−40.0 (−40.0)
Average precipitation mm (inches)	0.8 (0.03)	1.3 (0.05)	3.0 (0.12)	5.4 (0.21)	12.7 (0.50)	26.2 (1.03)	34.3 (1.35)	29.5 (1.16)	13.2 (0.52)	6.3 (0.25)	2.7 (0.11)	1.6 (0.06)	137 (5.39)
Average precipitation days (≥ 0.1 mm)	1.9	1.8	2.2	2.4	4.4	6.9	8.1	6.5	4.7	2.4	2.5	2.5	46.3
Average snowy days	3.8	3.7	3.2	2.1	0.2	0	0	0	0.1	1.6	4.2	4.8	23.7
Average relative humidity (%)	66	56	40	29	30	38	44	46	42	44	55	65	46
Mean monthly sunshine hours	219.3	224.0	273.1	285.4	308.7	303.9	306.1	300.2	272.0	251.3	211.8	198.6	3,154.4
Percentage possible sunshine	75	75	73	70	67	66	66	70	74	75	74	72	71
Source 1: China Meteorological Administration
Source 2: Weather China, Pogoda.ru.net (extremes)

== Administrative divisions ==
Erenhot is divided into 1 sum and 2 township-level administrations.

Name	Simplified Chinese	Hanyu Pinyin	Mongolian (Hudum Script)	Mongolian (Cyrillic)	Administrative division code
Sum
Gerelt Od Sum	格日勒敖都苏木	Gérìlè'áodū Sūmù	ᠭᠡᠷᠡᠯᠲᠦᠣ᠋ᠳᠣ ᠰᠤᠮᠤ	Баянбулаг сум	152501200
Township-level administrations
Erenhot Community Construction Administration	二连浩特市社区建设管理局	Èrliánhàotè Shì Shèqū Jiànshè Guǎnlǐjú			152501400
Erenhot Border Economic and Technological Cooperation Zone	二连边境经济技术合作区	Èrlián Biānjìng Jīngjì Jìshù Hézuòqū			152501401

== Economy ==
The border town is a rail port city and the largest hub for cross-border trade between Mongolia and China. When authorities opened the town up in 1992 to international trade, Erenhot underwent a transformation growing from 8,000 people then to an estimated 100,000 people including migrant workers.

The Dabusan Nur salt lake to the north of Erenhot provided an economic boom to the city's chemical industry during the late 1990s. The lake has provided Erenhot with a large water supply which also contributed to the rapid growth of the city and economy.

As a destination for wholesalers moving goods across the border, the city hosts a large trading market, International Trade City. Built in 2006, the wholesale market houses hundreds of tenants selling silk fabrics, furs, and other commodities. Key imports through the port include Mongolian minerals, coal, and livestock products such as meat, cashmere, and wool, while China exports electronics, machinery, building materials, and consumer goods northward.

Cross-border activity surged markedly in 2024. By early September of that year, combined inbound and outbound trips through Erenhot's highway and railway ports had risen 95 percent year-on-year to 1.75 million, while the number of transport vehicles passing through reached 442,000—roughly double the figure from the same period in 2023. This growth was partly driven by the April 2024 introduction of a 24-hour freight crossing on a trial basis, which helped ease truck congestion at the port. Cross-border e-commerce has also grown rapidly, with Mongolian goods such as honey, beef jerky, and cashmere becoming popular imports alongside outbound Chinese consumer goods.

The Erenhot–Zamyn-Uud Economic Cooperation Zone, spanning 18.03 square kilometres across the Chinese and Mongolian sides of the border, is currently under development. It aims to integrate trade, logistics, processing industries, and tourism to further deepen economic ties between the two countries, with a long-term target of accommodating 60,000 workers and 3 million visitors annually by 2030.

== Transport ==
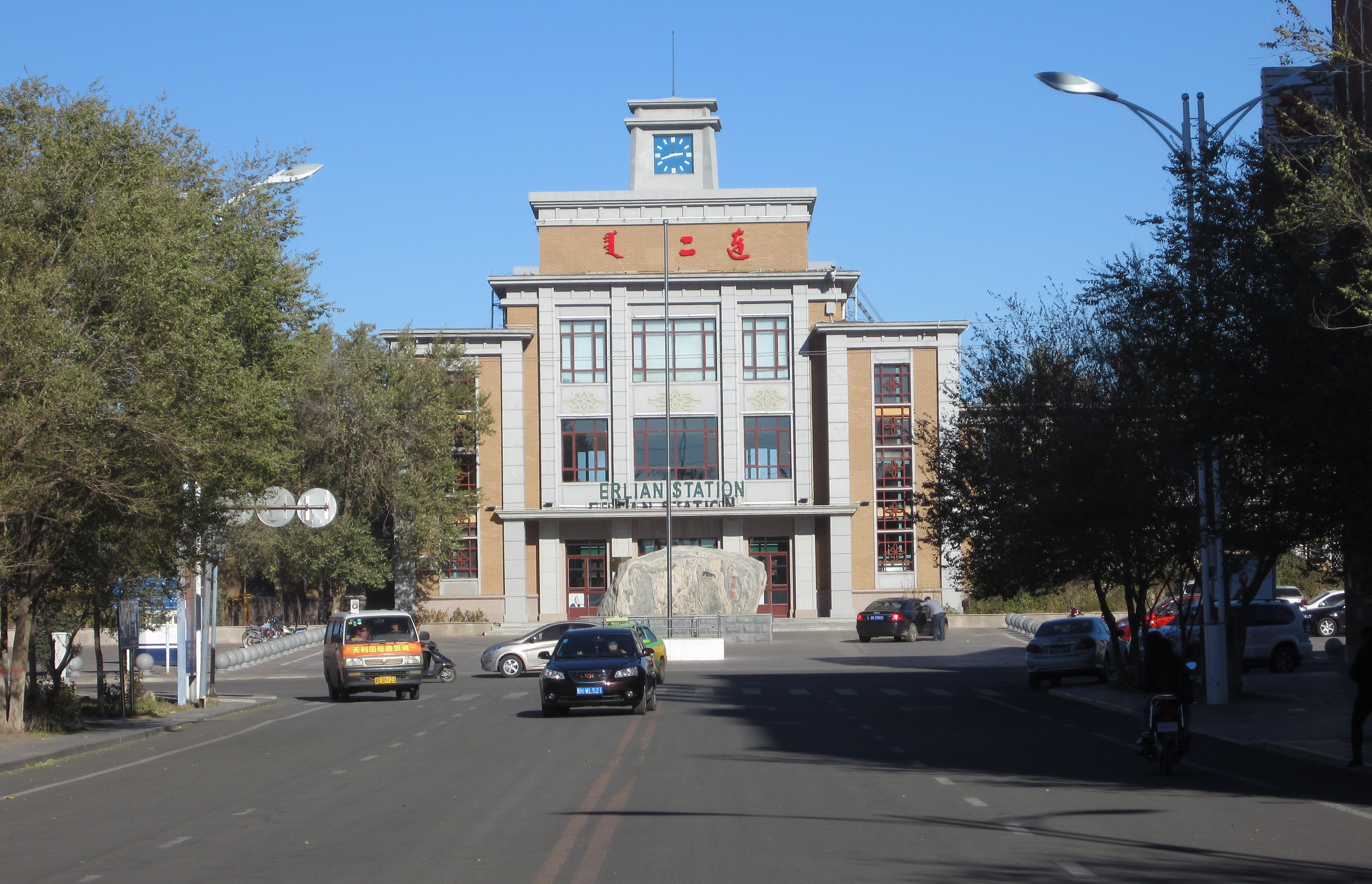
Erenhot train station

Erenhot is a key border town on the Trans-Mongolian Railway, serving as one of two major international railway crossings in Inner Mongolia (the other being Manzhouli on the Sino-Russian border). It is the primary land gateway for rail-based trade between China and Mongolia, and the sole entry and exit point for the central corridor of the China-Europe Railway Express.

Erenhot is the principal border crossing where international trains (including services between Hohhot and Ulaanbaatar) are handled due to the break-of-gauge between China’s standard gauge and Mongolia’s Russian gauge (1520 mm). Trains typically require bogie exchange or transshipment at the border to continue their journey. The Xilinhot–Erenhot railway (锡二铁路), which strengthens rail access to the Erenhot corridor, was completed and opened to traffic in October 2016 as part of broader capacity expansion in Inner Mongolia’s freight network.

The town is also the northern terminus of China National Highway 208, which stretches southward to Changzhi, Shanxi Province, linking Erenhot to China's broader national highway network.

Erenhot Saiwusu International Airport offers scheduled flights to Beijing (Daxing), Hohhot, Tongliao, Chifeng, Ulanqab, and Ulaanbaatar, the last of which is the airport's sole international route. As of 2026, carriers operating from the airport include Toumai Air, China Express Airlines, and Beijing Capital Airlines, with approximately 206 departures per month.

== Dinosaurs ==
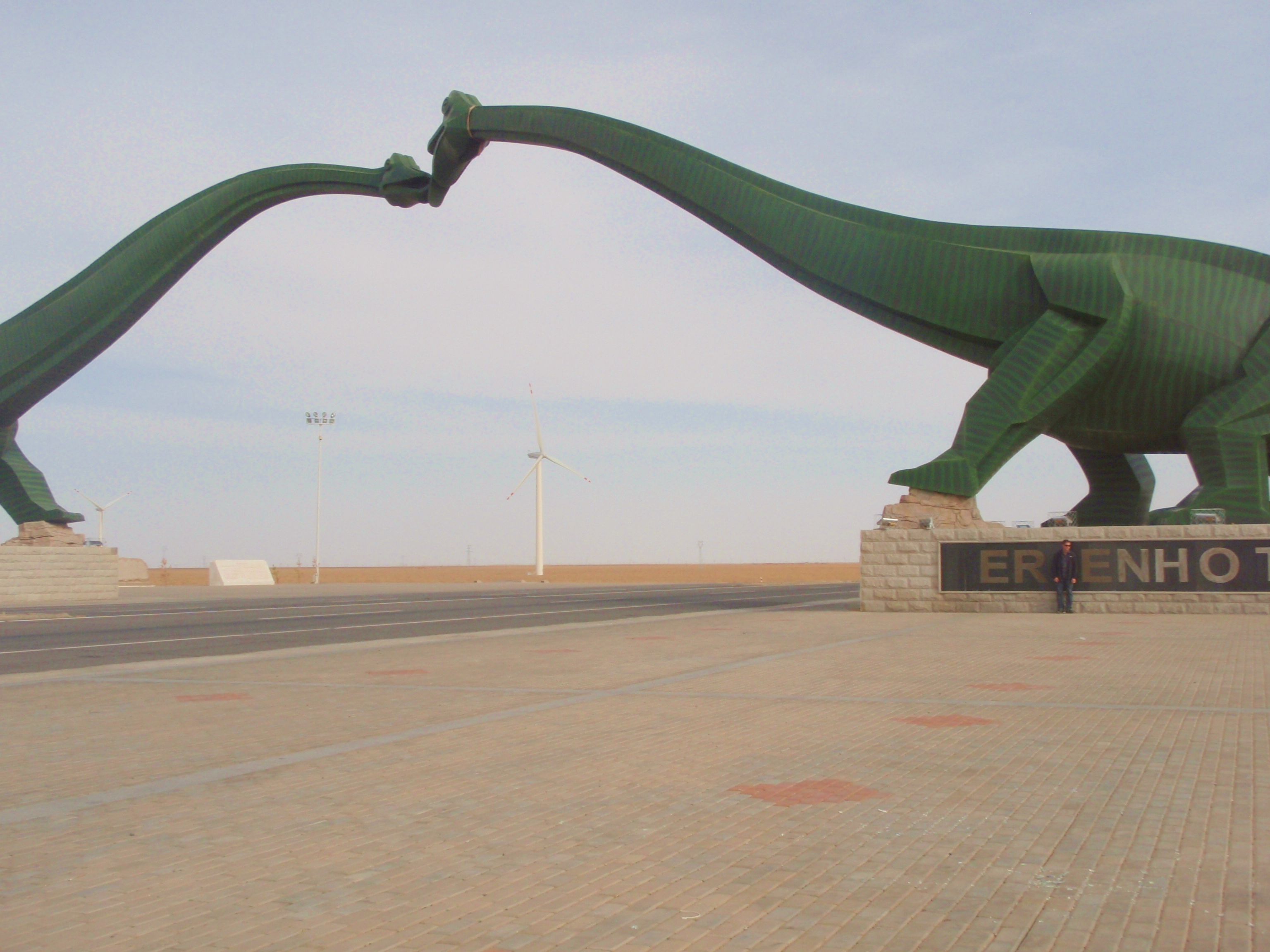
Kissing Sauropods bridge the road outside Erenhot

The area around the town, especially a salt lake known to paleontologists as Iren Dabasu or Iren Nor (Mongolian: ereen = colourful, davs = salt, nuur = lake) to the east, is known for the discovery of a number of different dinosaurs. The city houses a dinosaur museum, and in 2006 a big arch in form of two Sauropoda was built on the highway southward. In 2007, a number of smaller figures of different species were added.

== See also ==
- List of dinosaur-bearing rock formations
- Gigantoraptor
- Alectrosaurus
