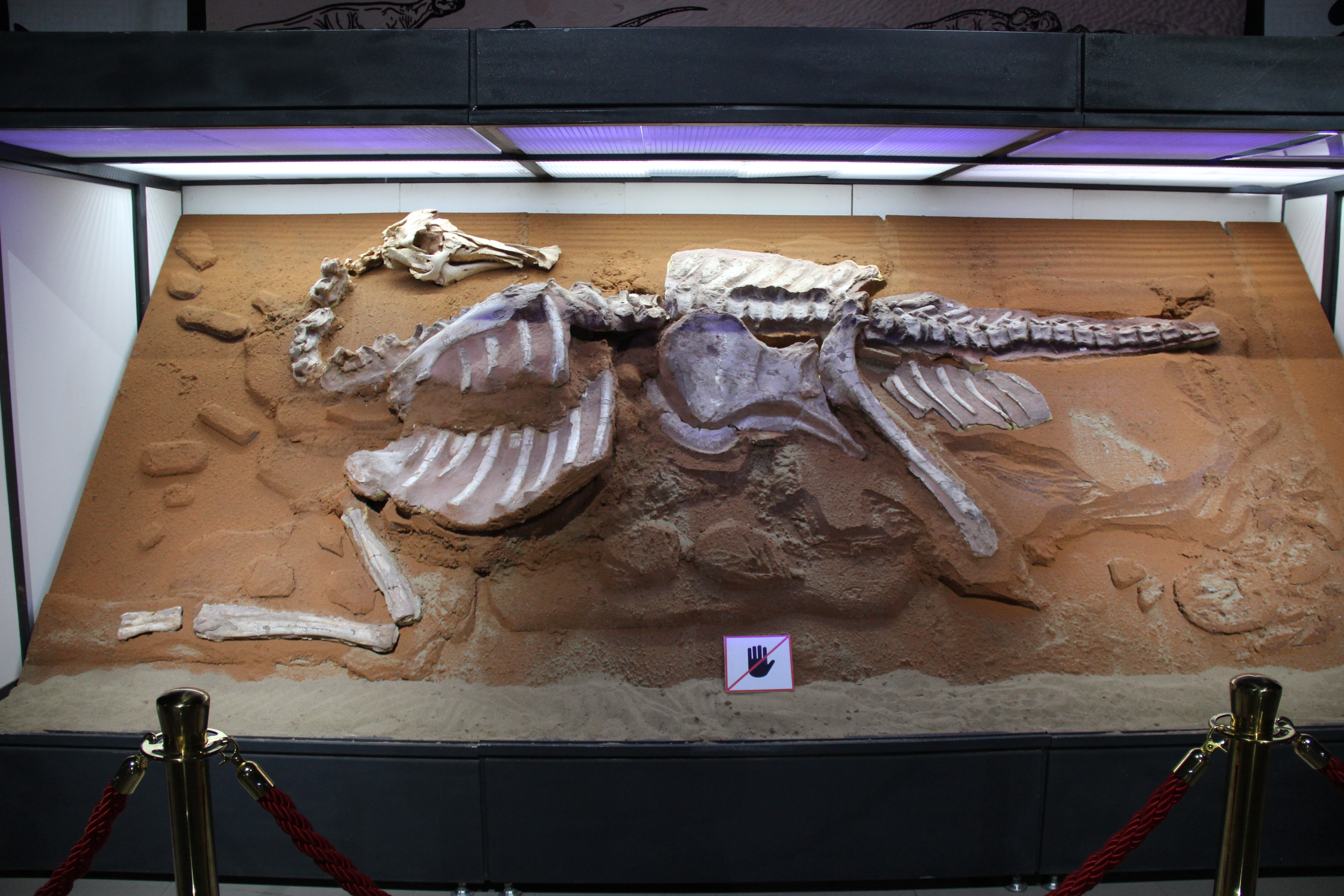
- Skeleton on display at the Central Museum of Mongolian Dinosaurs, Ulaanbaatar

Scientific classification
- Kingdom: Animalia
- Phylum: Chordata
- Class: Reptilia
- Clade: Dinosauria
- Clade: †Ornithischia
- Clade: †Ornithopoda
- Clade: †Hadrosauromorpha
- Genus: †Bactrosaurus; Gilmore, 1933

Type species
- †Bactrosaurus johnsoni Gilmore, 1933

Other species
- †B. kysylkumensis? (Riabinin, 1931 [originally Cionodon])

Synonyms
- "Bakesaurus" Zhou, 2005 (nomen nudum); Cionodon kysylkumensis? Riabinin, 1931

= Bactrosaurus =

Bactrosaurus Temporal range: Late Cretaceous (Cenomanian – Santonian) 96–85 Ma

Extinct genus of dinosaurs

Bactrosaurus (/ˌbæktrəˈsɔːrəs/; meaning "Club lizard," "baktron" = club + sauros = lizard) is a genus of herbivorous hadrosauroid dinosaur that lived in Asia during the Late Cretaceous, from about 96 to 85 million years ago. The position Bactrosaurus occupies in the Cretaceous makes it one of the earliest known hadrosauroids, and although it is not known from a full skeleton, Bactrosaurus is one of the best known of these early hadrosauroids, making its discovery a significant finding.

== Discovery ==
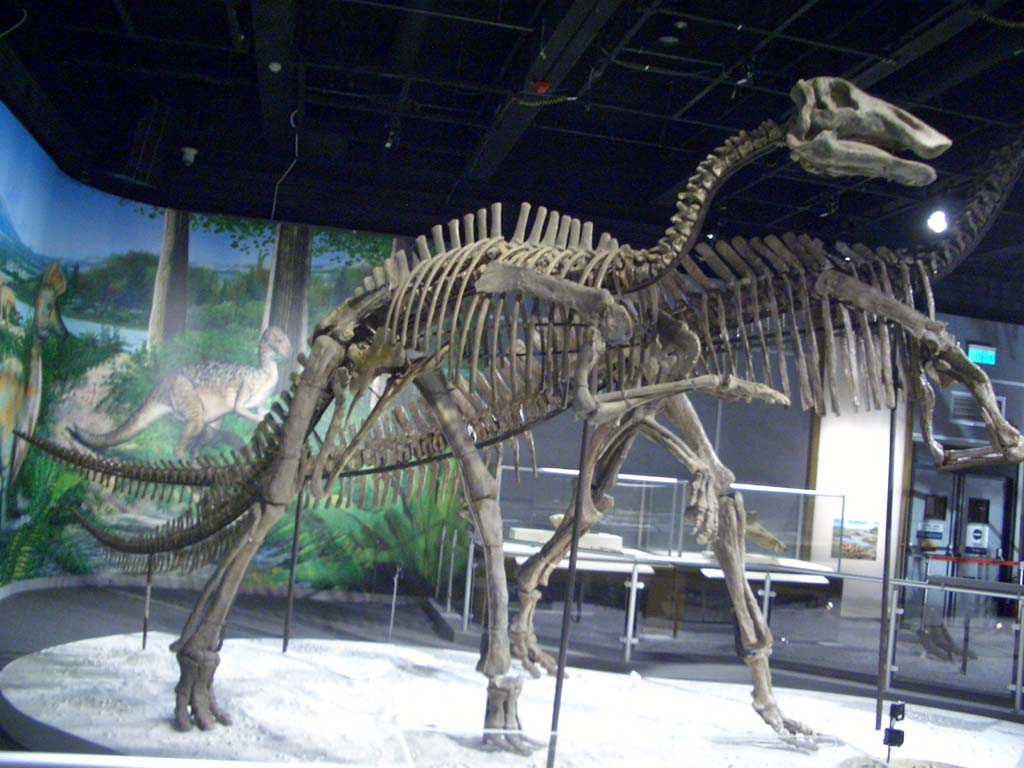
Restored skeleton displayed at the Hong Kong Science Museum

The first Bactrosaurus remains recovered from the Iren Dabasu Formation in the Gobi Desert of China were composed of partial skeletons of six individual B. johnsoni. The specimens collected appear to come from a variety of age groups, from individuals that may be hatchlings to full-sized adults. The fossils were described in 1933 by Charles W. Gilmore, who named the new animal Bactrosaurus, or "club lizard", in reference to the large club-shaped neural spines projecting from some of the vertebrae. The Iren Dabasu Formation has been dated to the Cenomanian stage, around 95.8 ± 6.2 million years ago.

No complete remains have yet to be uncovered, but Bactrosaurus is still better known than most of the early hadrosaurs. Known parts of the anatomy of Bactrosaurus include the limbs, pelvis, and most of the skull (although the crest is notably absent).

"Bakesaurus" is an informal name based on a maxilla from the Majiacun Formation of China assigned to Bactrosaurus in 2001. The nomen nudum was created and pictured in a Chinese-language book by Zhou (2005) and first surfaced on the Internet during February 2006 when it was mentioned on the Dinosaur Mailing List by Jerry D. Harris.

== Description ==
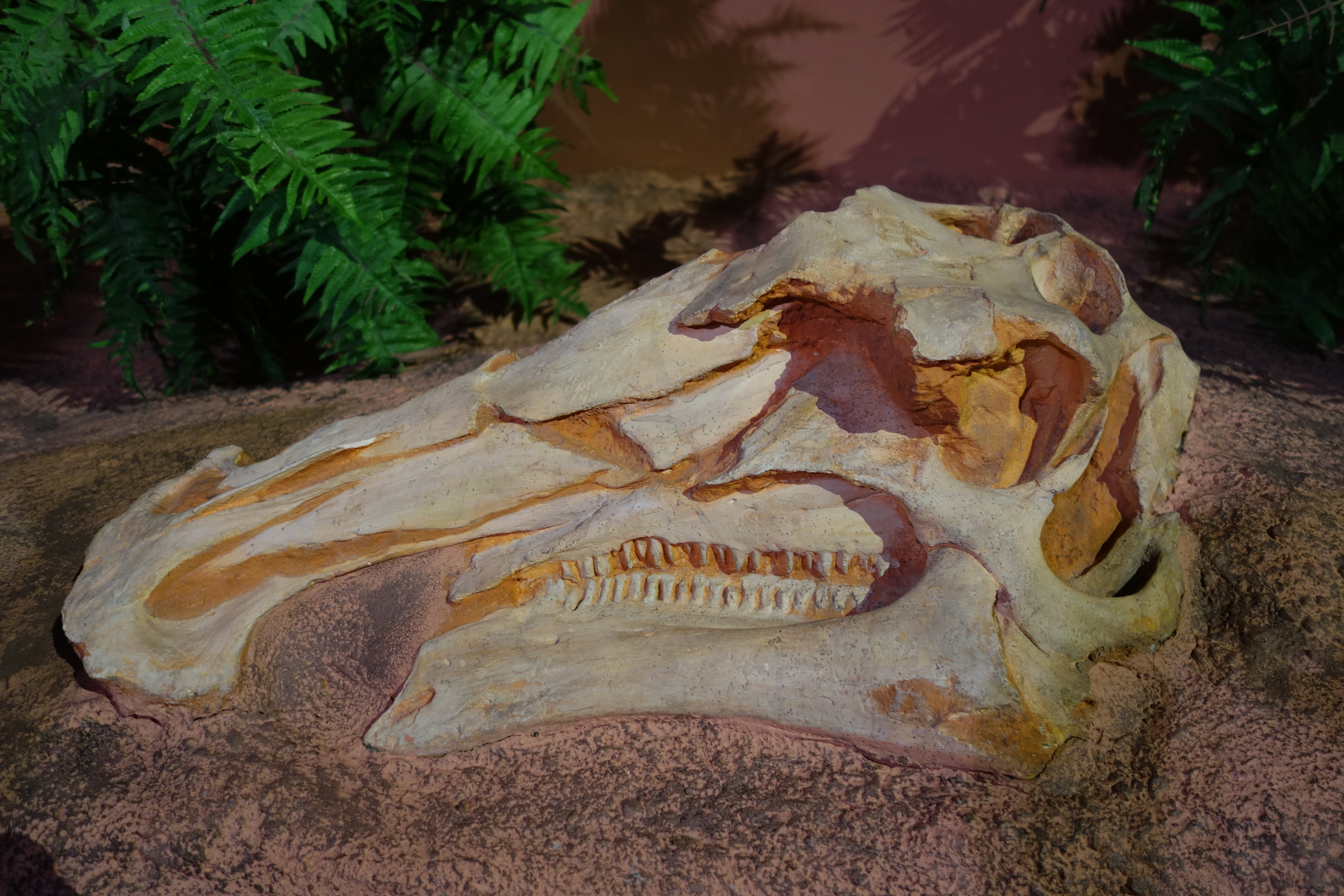
Partial B. johnsoni skull at the Museum of Ancient Life

A typical Bactrosaurus would have been 6–6.5 m (20–21 ft) long and weighed 1.2 metric tons (1.3 short tons). It was an early relative of Lambeosaurus and shows a number of iguanodont-like features, including three stacked teeth for each visible tooth, small maxillary teeth, and an unusually powerful build for a hadrosaur. It shows features intermediate between those of the two main hadrosaurid groups. Its femur measured 80 centimetres (2.6 ft) long.

Bactrosaurus was originally thought to be a lambeosaurine hadrosaurid, supposedly the oldest and most primitive known, and its crestless head was seen as an anomaly. A 1990 popular book suggested that it had an incompletely preserved crest, but recent studies place Bactrosaurus as a more basal hadrosauromorph. Basal members do not preserve hollow crests, so Bactrosaurus itself is likely to be crestless.

== Paleobiology ==
Size comparison

In 2003, evidence of tumors, including hemangiomas, desmoplastic fibroma, metastatic cancer, and osteoblastoma was discovered in fossilized Bactrosaurus skeletons. Rothschild et al. tested dinosaur vertebrae for tumors using computerized tomography and fluoroscope screening. Several other hadrosaurids, including Brachylophosaurus, Gilmoreosaurus, and Edmontosaurus, also tested positive. Although more than 10,000 fossils were examined in this manner, the tumors were limited to Bactrosaurus and closely related genera. The tumors may have been caused by environmental factors or genetic propensity.

== See also ==
- Timeline of hadrosaur research
