= Pes (anatomy) =

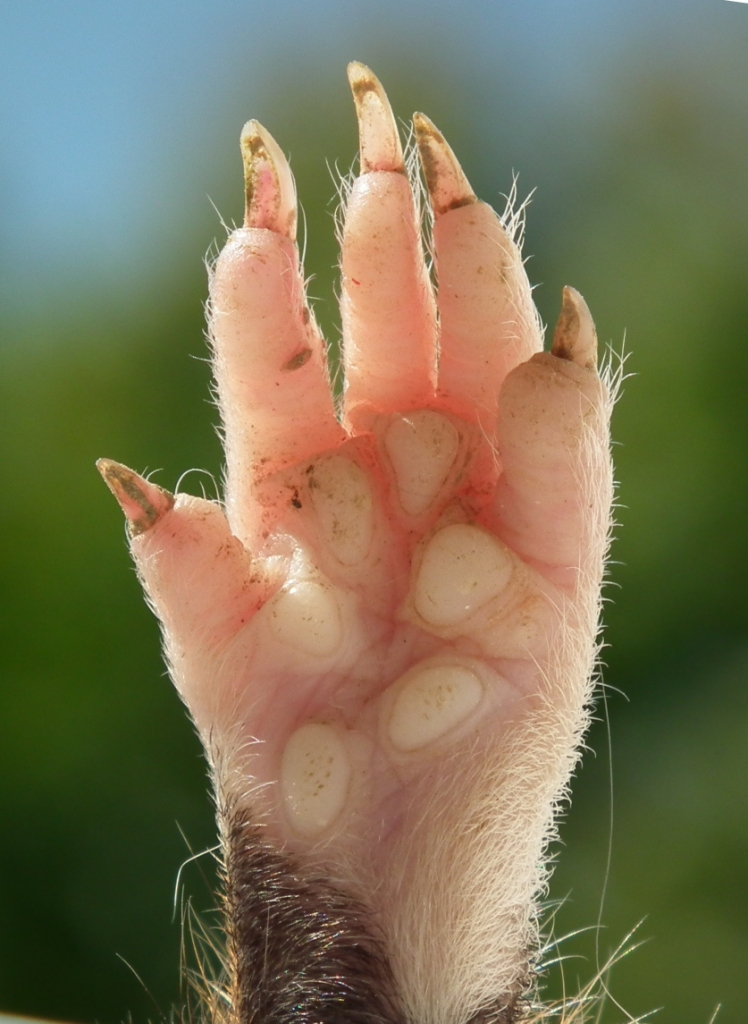
Pes of a rodent, Eurasian hamster Cricetus cricetus

The pes (Latin for foot) is the zoological term for the distal portion of the hind limb of tetrapod animals. It is the part of the pentadactyl limb that includes the metatarsals and digits (phalanges). During evolution, it has taken many forms and served a variety of functions. It can be represented by the foot of primates, the lower hind limb of hoofed animals, the lower portion of the leg of dinosaurs including birds or the rear paw. It is also represented in the rear 'paddle' of extinct marine reptiles, such as plesiosaurs. The oldest types of tetrapods had seven or eight digits.

== See also ==
- Manus (anatomy)
