= Bayanshiree Formation =

Geological formation in Mongolia

- Stratigraphic range: Cenomanian-Coniacian; ~96–89.6 Ma
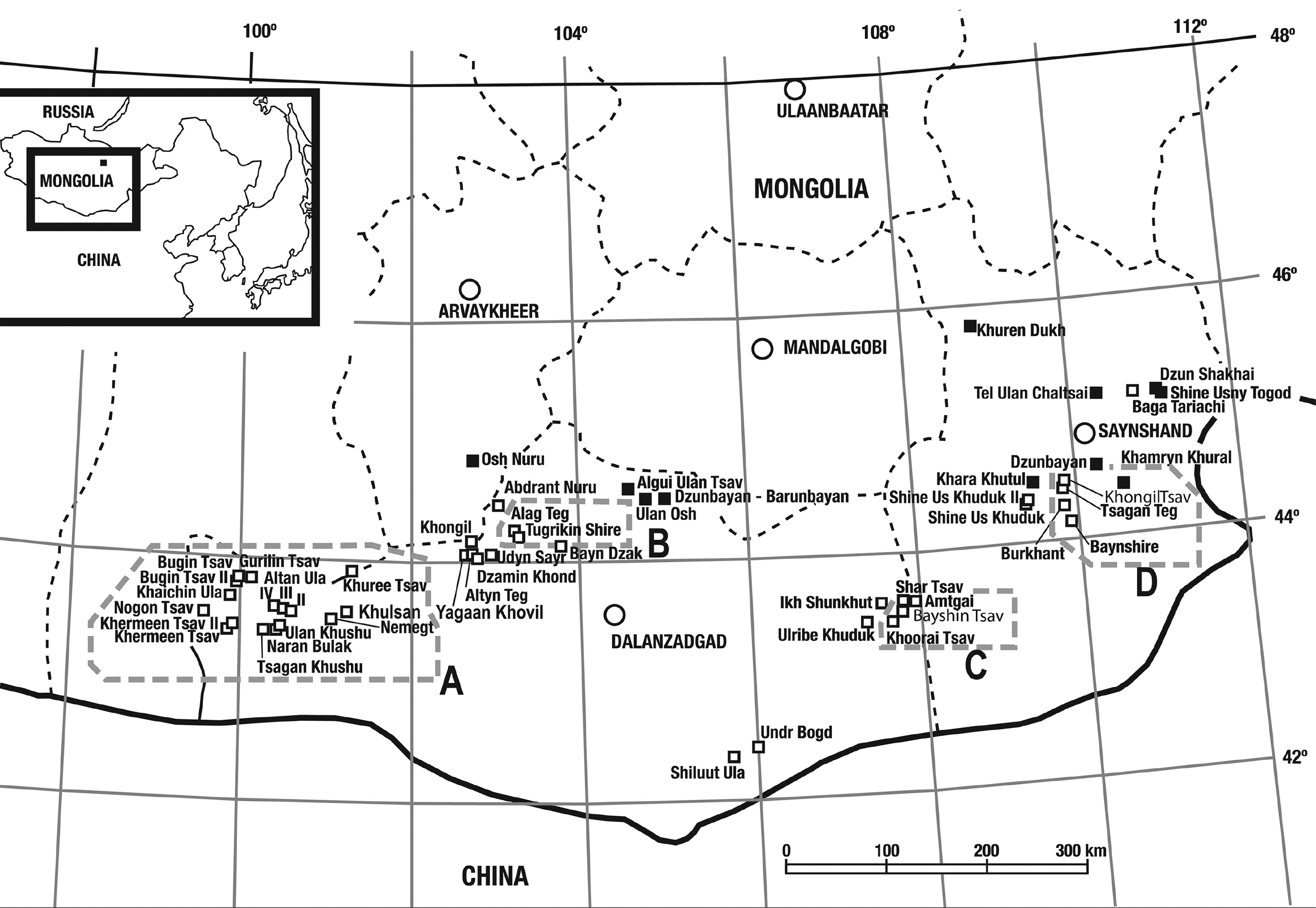
- Fossil localities in Mongolia. From C to D, mainly Bayanshiree locations
- Type: Geological formation
- Sub-units: Upper beds, lower beds
- Underlies: Javkhlant Formation
- Overlies: Baruunbayan Formation
- Thickness: Up to 300 m (980 ft)

Lithology
- Primary: Claystone, sandstone
- Other: Conglomerate, mudstone

Location
- Coordinates: 44.3°N 109.2°E
- Approximate paleocoordinates: 46.5°N 100.0°E
- Region: Gobi Desert
- Country: Mongolia

Type section
- Named for: Bayan Shireh Cliffs
- Named by: Vasiliev et al.
- Year defined: 1959
- Bayanshiree Formation (Mongolia)

The Bayanshiree Formation (also known as Baynshiree/Baynshire, Baynshirenskaya Svita, Baysheen Shireh, or Bayan Shireh) is a geological formation in Mongolia, that dates to the Cretaceous period. It was first described and established by Vasiliev et al. 1959.

== Description ==
The Bayanshiree Formation is primarily composed by varicoloured claystones and sandstones with calcareous concretions and characterized by grey mudstones and yellowish-brown medium grained sandstones. Up to 300 m (980 ft) thick, the most complete sections are found in the eastern Gobi Desert, consisting of fine-grained, often cross-stratified gray sandstone interbedded with claystone and concretionary, intraformational conglomerates with relatively thick units of red to brown mudstone in the upper part. The Baynshire and Burkhant localities are mainly composed by mudstone, siltstone, sandstone, and conglomerates, with most of their sedimentation being fluvial. The environments that were present on the Bayanshiree Formation consisted mainly on semi-arid climates with large water bodies, such as rivers or lakes. Although it is considered to be partially lacustrine, largescale cross-stratification in many of the sandstone layers at the Baynshire locality seem to indicate that a large meandering fluvial system was present. It has been implied that during the late Bayan Shirehnian times, large rivers with direct connections to the sea drained a prominent part of the eastern Gobi region.

=== Stratigraphy ===
According to Jerzykiewicz and Russell, the Bayanshiree Formation can be divided into 2 informal units: upper and lower beds. Danilov and colleagues have suggested that the lower beds are Cenomanian to early Turonian, and the upper beds are late Turonian to Santonian in age. While the lower beds are composed by extensive conglomerate that indicates the ancient presence of very active rivers, the upper beds are mainly composed by mudstone and claystone that is interbedded by sandstone, indicating again, the presence of rivers but also lakes and other water bodies.

Based on comparisons with other formations, Jerzykiewicz and Russell suggested that the Bayanshiree paleofauna seems to correspond best with the Turonian through early Campanian stages of the Late Cretaceous, about 93 to 80 million years ago. However, examination of the magnetostratigraphy of the formation indicates that the entire Bayanshiree lies within the Cretaceous Long Normal, which lasted only until the end of the Santonian stage, giving a possible Cenomanian through Late Santonian age, between 98 and 83 million years ago. In 2012, Averianov and Sues re-examined many formations from the Gobi Desert and using biostratigraphic occurrences and previous dating, the Bayanshiree Formation was considered to be Cenomanian to Santonian in age. The lower beds dating to 98 million and 90 million years ago (early Cenomanian to late Turonian), and the upper beds dating to 90 million and 83 million years ago (late Turonian to late Santonian). Calcite U–Pb measurements performed by Kurumada and colleagues in 2020 have estimated the age of the Bayanshiree Formation between 95.9 ± 6.0 Ma and 89.6 ± 4.0 Ma.

=== Correlations ===
A potential correlation between the Iren Dabasu Formation has been long suggested by most authors, mainly based on the highly similar vertebrate assemblages. However, Van Itterbeeck et al. 2005 argued against this correlation concluding that instead, the Iren Dabasu Formation was coeval with the younger Nemegt Formation based on the charophyte and ostracode assemblages; therefore, these formations were dated to the Late Campanian-Early Maastrichtian. Averianov and Sues instead proposed a correlation between the Bayanshiree, Iren Dabasu and Bissekty formations. In 2015, Tsuihiji and team found the Iren Dabasu-Nemegt correlation to be inconsistent since the microfossil assemblages used by Van Itterbeeck and colleagues were not restricted to the Maastrichtian period and the similarities between these assemblages were most probably due to a similar deposition and climate settings.

== Paleobiota of the Bayanshiree Formation ==
In terms of biodiversity, therizinosaurs and turtles were the most abundant vertebrates across the formation, as evidenced on numerous remains. Nevertheless, hadrosauroids were fairly abundant too, particularly at the Baynshire locality with numerous remains unearthed from this area and a new unnamed hadrosauroid. In addition, most specimens of Gobihadros come from this locality. Also, niche partitioning has been reported within the therizinosaurids Erlikosaurus and Segnosaurus, and the ankylosaurs Talarurus and Tsagantegia. Mammals however, are extremely uncommon; Tsagandelta is the only mammal described so far. Besides vertebrate fossils, abundant fossil fruits have been collected from the Bor Guvé and Khara Khutul localities and they are especially abundant at Bor Guvé. Although they resemble Abelmoschus esculentus their taxonomic position remains unclear and further examination is required.

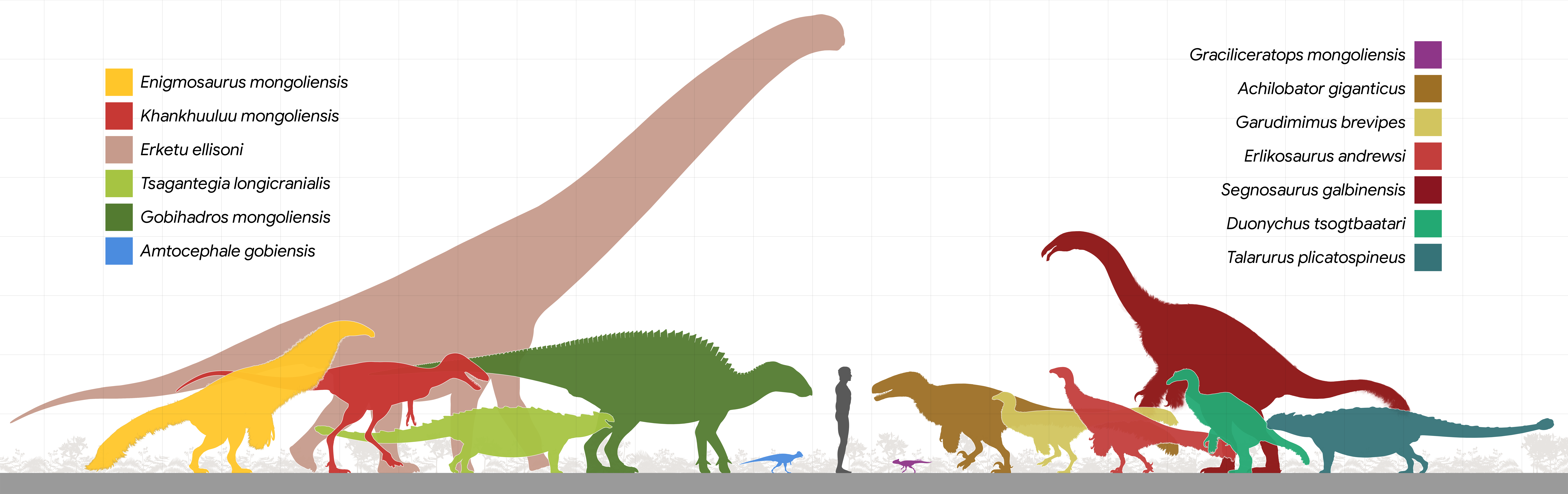
Bayanshiree Formation fauna

Color key: Taxon / Reclassified taxon / Taxon falsely reported as present / Dubious taxon or junior synonym / Ichnotaxon / Ootaxon / Morphotaxon	Notes; Uncertain or tentative taxa are in small text; ~~crossed out~~ taxa are discredited.

=== Crocodylomorphs ===
Crocodylomorphs reported from the Bayanshiree Formation
Genus	Species	Location	Stratigraphic Position	Material	Notes	Images
Paralligator	P. gradilifrons	Sheeregeen Gashoon		"Complete skull with fragmentary postcrania."	A paralligatorid.	
Paralligator	P. major	Sheeregeen Gashoon		"Fragmentary crania."	A paralligatorid.	
Unnamed crocodylomorph ichnotaxon	Indeterminate	Shine Us Khuduk		"Swim tracks."	Tracks made underwater by a swimming individual.	

=== Fish ===
Sharks reported from the Bayanshiree Formation
Genus	Species	Location	Stratigraphic Position	Material	Notes	Images
Hybodus	H. kansaiensis	Bayshin Tsav		"Teeth and postcrania."	A hybodontid.	
Osteichthyes spp.	Indeterminate			"Unspecified material."	Bony fish.	

=== Flora ===
Flora reported from the Bayanshiree Formation
Genus	Species	Location	Stratigraphic Position	Material	Notes	Images
Bothrocaryum	B. gobience	Khara Khutul		"Unspecified material."	A cornacean.	
Nyssoidea	N. mongolica	Khara Khutul		"Unspecified material."	A cornacean.	
Angiosperm spp.	Indeterminate	Bor Guvé, Khara Khutul		"Fossil fruits."	Very abundant at Bor Guvé.	
Taxodium	T. sp	Khara Khutul			A relative of the Bald Cypress	

=== Mammals ===
Deltatheroidans reported from the Bayanshiree Formation
Genus	Species	Location	Stratigraphic Position	Material	Notes	Images
Tsagandelta	T. dashzevegi	Tsagan Tsonj		"Partial left dentary."	A deltatheroidan.	
Bayshinoryctes	B. shuvalovi			"Dental remains"	A stem placental	
Ravjaa	R. ishiii			"Lower jaw bones"	A zhelestid eutherian	

=== Pterosaurs ===
Pterosaurs reported from the Bayanshiree Formation
Genus	Species	Location	Stratigraphic Position	Material	Notes	Images
Tsogtopteryx	T. mongoliensis	Bayshin Tsav		"Middle cervical vertebra."	An azhdarchid.	
Gobiazhdarcho	G. tsogtbaatari	Burkhant		"Four cervical vertebrae."	An azhdarchid.	

=== Turtles ===
Turtles reported from the Bayanshiree Formation
Genus	Species	Location	Stratigraphic Position	Material	Notes	Images
Charitonyx	C. tajanikolaevae	Khara Khutul		"Fragmented postcrania."	A nanhsiungchelyid.	
Gobiapalone	G. orlovi	Baynshire, Burkhant, Khongil Tsav		"Skull and postcrania."	A trionychid.	
Hanbogdemys	H. orientalis	Khara Khutul		"Fragmented cervical remains."	A nanhsiungchelyid.	
Kharakhutulia	K. kalandadzei	Khara Khutul	Lower beds	"Fragmented postcrania from multiple specimens."	A nanhsiungchelyid.	
Kirgizemys sp.	Indeterminate	Khara Khutul		"Fragmented postcrania."	A nanhsiungchelyid.	
Kizylkumemys	K. schultzi	Khara Khutul	Lower beds	"Fragmented postcrania."	A nanhsiungchelyid.	
Lindholmemys	L. martinsoni	Sheeregeen Gashoon, Usheen Khuduk	Upper beds	"Fragmentary shell."	A lindholmemydid.	
"Trionyx"	T. baynshirensis	Baynshire		"Fragmentary shell."	A trionychine.	
Pan-Carettochelys	Indeterminate	Uryl'b Usu Locality, Dornogovi Province	Lower Beds	Shell fragments	A stem-carettochelyid, originally assigned to the species "Anosteira" shuwalovi	

=== Dinosaurs ===
==== Ornithischians ====
===== Ankylosaurs =====
Ankylosaurs reported from the Bayanshiree Formation
Genus	Species	Location	Stratigraphic Position	Material	Notes	Images
Amtosaurus	A. magnus	Amtgai		"Partial braincase."	An ankylosaurid now regarded as nomen dubium.	
Maleevus	M. disparoserratus	Sheeregeen Gashoon	Upper beds	"Partial maxillae and a referred braincase."	An ankylosaurid now regarded as nomen dubium.	
Talarurus	T. plicatospineus	Bayshin Tsav, Baynshire, Shine Us Khuduk		"Multiple specimens including partial to nearly complete skulls and postcranial remains."	An ankylosaurid.	
Tsagantegia	T. longicranialis	Tsagan Teg		"Skull lacking lower jaws."	An ankylosaurid.	

===== Ceratopsians =====
Ceratopsians reported from the Bayanshiree Formation
Genus	Species	Location	Stratigraphic Position	Material	Notes	Images
Graciliceratops	G. mongoliensis	Sheeregeen Gashoon	Upper beds	"Fragmented skull and postcrania."	A neoceratopsian originally identified as Microceratus.	
Unnamed neoceratopsian	Indeterminate	Bayshin Tsav		"Left maxilla and teeth."	A neoceratopsian.	

===== Hadrosaurs =====
Hadrosaurs reported from the Bayanshiree Formation
Genus	Species	Location	Stratigraphic Position	Material	Notes	Images
Amblydactylus spp.	Indeterminate	Baynshire		"Five three-toed footprints."	Ornithopod tracks.	
Gobihadros	G. mongoliensis	Bayshin Tsav, Baynshire, Char Teeg, Khongil Tsav, Khoorai Tsav	Upper beds	"Multiple specimens with a virtually complete skull and postcranial remains".	A hadrosauroid.	
Hadrosauroidea indet.	Indeterminate	Shine Us Khuduk		"Isolated surangular".	A hadrosauroid.	
Ovaloolithidae indet.	Indeterminate	Mogoyn Ulagiyn Khaets		"Eggs, shells and egg clutches."	Eggs probably laid by a hadrosaur.	
Spheroolithus sp.	Indeterminate	Sheeregeen Gashoon		"Egg clutch."	Eggs probably laid by a hadrosaur.	
Undescribed Hadrosauroidea	Indeterminate	Amtgai, Bayshin Tsav, Bayshin Tsav IV, Khoorai Tsav		"Multiple postcranial remains including an articulated skeleton."	Hadrosauroid remains.	
Undescribed hadrosauroids	Indeterminate	Baynshire		"Remains of at least two juvenile hadrosauroids."	Juvenile hadrosauroids in a caenagnathoid nesting site.	
Unnamed hadrosauroid	Indeterminate	Baynshire, Char Teeg	Upper beds	"Partial right dentary and sparse postcranial remains."	A hadrosauroid slightly smaller than Gobihadros.	
Unnamed hadrosauroid	Indeterminate	Bayshin Tsav		"Nearly complete skeleton from a juvenile individual."	A hadrosauroid distinct from Gobihadros.	

===== Pachycephalosaurs =====
Pachycephalosaurs reported from the Bayanshiree Formation
Genus	Species	Location	Stratigraphic Position	Material	Notes	Images
Amtocephale	A. gobiensis	Amtgai		"Nearly complete frontoparietal dome."	A primitive pachycephalosaurid.	

==== Sauropods ====
Sauropods reported from the Bayanshiree Formation
Genus	Species	Location	Stratigraphic Position	Material	Notes	Images
Erketu	E. ellisoni	Bor Guvé		"Vertebrae and postcrania."	A somphospondylan.	
Sauropoda indet.	Indeterminate	Amtgai		"Partial vertebrae and pelvic elements."	A sauropod.	
Unnamed sauropod	Indeterminate	Shine Us Khuduk		"Articulated skeleton."	A sauropod.	
Unnamed sauropod ichnogenus	Indeterminate	Khavirgiin Dzo		"Four consecutive hind prints. Some Prints are Giant, at 106 cm in length.	Sauropod tracks.	
Titanosauria indet.	Indeterminate	Bor Guvé		"Vertebrae." Femur. Specimen was large already 20 metres (66 ft) and was still subadult.	A titanosaur.	

==== Theropods ====
===== Dromaeosaurids =====
Dromaeosaurids reported from the Bayanshiree Formation
Genus	Species	Location	Stratigraphic Position	Material	Notes	Images
Achillobator	A. giganticus	Burkhant		"Maxilla and fragmentary postcrania."	A giant dromaeosaurid.	
Dromaeosauridae indet.	Indeterminate	Burkhant		"Claw and large postcranial remains."	A dromaeosaurid.	
Unnamed velociraptorine	Indeterminate	Shine Us Khuduk, Tel Ulan Chaltsai		"Fragmentary crania and postcrania from two specimens."	A dromaeosaurid.	

===== Ornithomimosaurs =====
Ornithomimosaurs reported from the Bayanshiree Formation
Genus	Species	Location	Stratigraphic Position	Material	Notes	Images
"Gallimimus"	"G. mongoliensis"	Bayshin Tsav		"Complete skull with postcrania only lacking the caudal region."	An informally named ornithomimid that actually differs from Gallimimus.	
Garudimimus	G. brevipes	Bayshin Tsav		"Skull with fragmented postcrania."	An ornithomimosaur.	
Undescribed ornithomimosaur	Indeterminate	Amtgai		"Nearly 1 m (3.3 ft) long ulna."	A large ornithomimosaur.	
Undescribed ornithomimosaurs	Indeterminate	Baynshire, Bayshin Tsav, Khongil Tsav, Sheeregeen Gashoon, Shine Us Khuduk		"More than five specimens and a bonebed containing mainly postcranial elements."	Multiple ornithomimosaurian taxa.	

===== Oviraptorosaurs =====
Oviraptorosaurs reported from the Bayanshiree Formation
Genus	Species	Location	Stratigraphic Position	Material	Notes	Images
Caenagnathoidea indet.	Indeterminate	Baynshire		"Nests including elongatoolithid eggs and associated juveniles."	A large caenagnathoid nesting site.	
Macroelongatoolithus indet.	Indeterminate	Baynshire		"Eggs within a large nest."	Eggs probably laid by a large oviraptorosaur.	
Unnamed caenagnathid	Indeterminate	Tsagan Teg		"Partial lower jaw similar to Gigantoraptor."	A large caenagnathid.	

===== Therizinosaurs =====
Therizinosaurs reported from the Bayanshiree Formation
Genus	Species	Location	Stratigraphic Position	Material	Notes	Images
Dendroolithidae spp.	Indeterminate	Baynshire		"Various nests and egg clutches."	Eggs probably laid by a therizinosaur	
Duonychus	D. tsogtbaatari	Urlibe Khudak		Partial post-cranial skeleton	A therizinosaurid	Duonychus_Restoration
Enigmosaurus	E. mongoliensis	Khara Khutul		"Incompletely preserved pelvis."	A therizinosauroid.	
Erlikosaurus	E. andrewsi	Bayshin Tsav	Upper beds	"Skull, right pes, and left humerus."	A therizinosaurid	
Segnosaurus	S. galbinensis	Amtgai, Bayshin Tsav, Khara Khutul, Urlibe Khudak		"Multiple specimens including the lower jaws and partial postcrania."	A large therizinosaurid	
Undescribed therizinosaurs	Indeterminate	Bayshin Tsav, Khara Khutul, Shine Us Khuduk		"Cranial and postcranial elements from multiple specimens."	Some elements may represent already named taxa.	

===== Troodontids =====
Troodontids reported from the Bayanshiree Formation
Genus	Species	Location	Stratigraphic Position	Material	Notes	Images
Undescribed troodontid	Indeterminate	Bayshin Tsav		"Partial vertebrae, forelimbs and hindlimbs."	A troodontid.	

===== Tyrannosauroids =====
Tyrannosauroids reported from the Bayanshiree Formation
Genus	Species	Location	Stratigraphic Position	Material	Notes	Images
Khankhuuluu	K. mongoliensis	Bayshin Tsav; Tsagan Teg		Three specimens, consisting of partial cranial and postcranial material	Bayshin Tsav specimens originally identified as Alectrosaurus	

===== Other Theropods =====
Genus	Species	Location	Stratigraphic Position	Material	Notes	Images
Deinonychosauria indet.	Indeterminate	Shine Us Khuduk		"Isolated remains including a pedal phalanx II-2."	The pedal phalanx II-2 is similar to Achillobator.	
Theropoda indet.	Indeterminate	Urlibe Khudak		"Nest with eggs."	Eggs probably laid by a theropod.	

== See also ==
- List of dinosaur-bearing rock formations
- List of Asian dinosaurs
- Laurasia
- Geology of Mongolia
- Cretaceous Mongolia
