= Zhumabao Formation =

Geologic formation in China

- Stratigraphic range: Late Cretaceous
- Type: Geological formation

Location
- Region: Asia

The Zhumabao Formation is a geological formation in Shanxi, China whose strata date back to the Late Cretaceous. Dinosaur remains are among the fossils that have been recovered from the formation.

== Vertebrate paleofauna ==
- Microceratus sp. (formerly known as Microceratops)

== See also ==
- List of dinosaur-bearing rock formations
