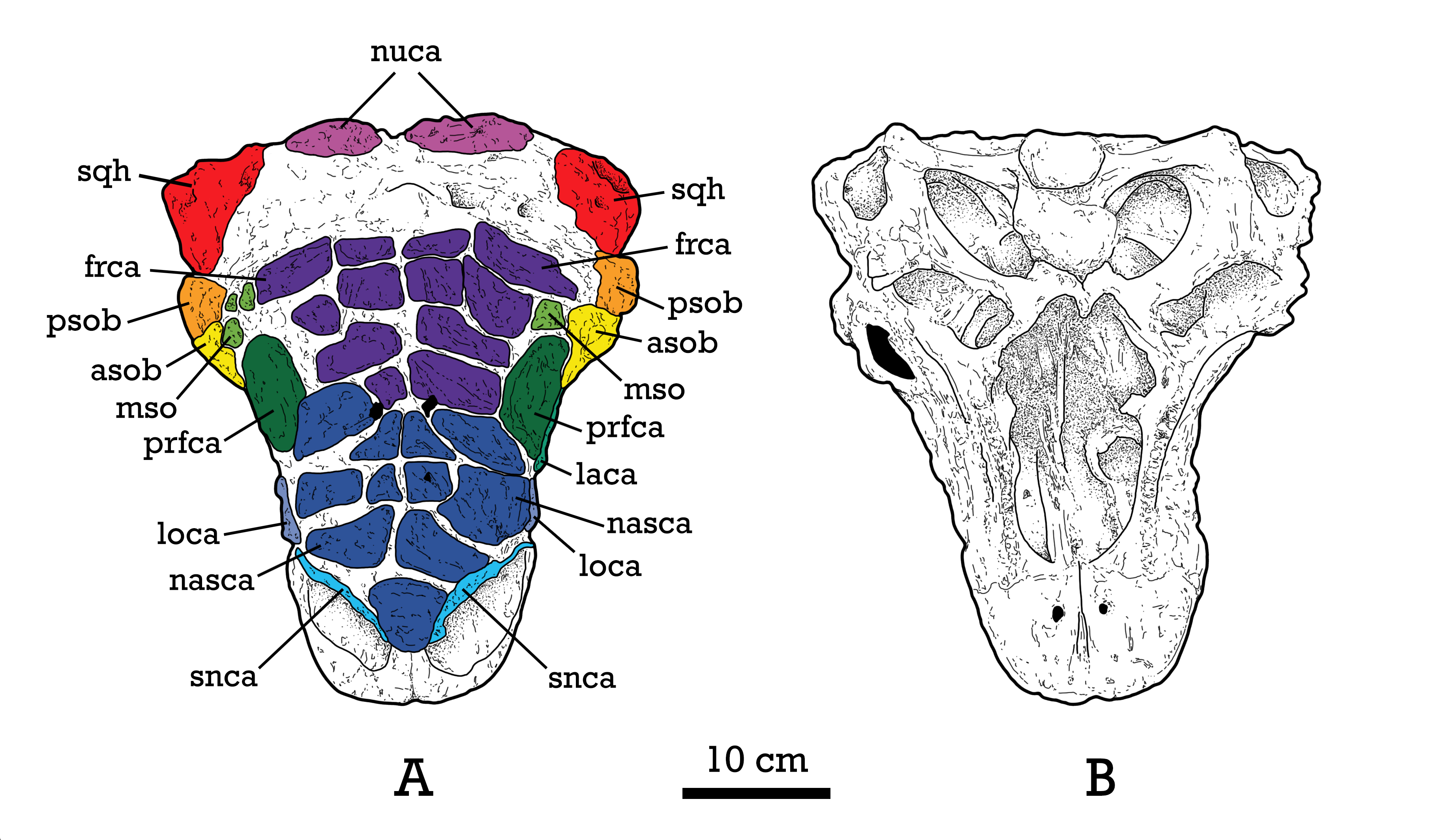
- Diagram of the holotype skull in dorsal and ventral views

Scientific classification
- Kingdom: Animalia
- Phylum: Chordata
- Class: Reptilia
- Clade: Dinosauria
- Clade: †Ornithischia
- Clade: †Thyreophora
- Clade: †Ankylosauria
- Family: †Ankylosauridae
- Subfamily: †Ankylosaurinae
- Genus: †Tsagantegia; Tumanova, 1993

Type species
- †Tsagantegia longicranialis Tumanova, 1993

= Tsagantegia =

Tsagantegia Temporal range: Late Cretaceous, 92–86 Ma

Extinct genus of dinosaurs

Tsagantegia (/ˌsɑːɡɑːnˈteɪɡiə/; meaning Tsagan Teg) is a genus of medium-sized ankylosaurid thyreophoran dinosaur that lived in Asia during the Late Cretaceous period. The genus is monotypic, including only the type species, T. longicranialis. The specimen consists of a very partial individual, comprising the skull and lacking postcranial remains. Since it only preserves the skull, Tsagantegia is mainly characterized by its elongated snout and the flattened facial osteoderms, greatly differing from other ankylosaurs.

== Discovery and naming ==
The first, and only, discovery of Tsagantegia fossils occurred in 1983, when the Mesozoic team of the Joint Soviet-Mongolian Paleontological Expedition unearthed an ankylosaur skull from the Tsagan-Teg (or "White Mountain") locality near the town of Dzun-Bayan, Mongolia. This locality is one of many deriving from the Bayan Shireh Formation, an Upper Cretaceous (Cenomanian-Turonian)-aged geologic formation in the eastern Gobi Desert, Mongolia. This ankylosaur skull was then deposited at the Institute of Paleontology and Geology of the Mongolian Academy of Sciences (MPC) under specimen number MPC 700/17. This skull remained unresearched until it was described by Russian paleontologist Tatiana Tumanova in 1993. Tumanova described the skull as belonging to a new genus and species of ankylosaurine ankylosaurid, Tsagantegia longicranialis. The generic name, Tsagantegia, is in reference to the Tsagan-Teg locality where the skull was unearthed, and the specific name, longicranialis, comes from the Latin roots longus "long" and cranium "skull" in reference to its elongated skull. Due to being known solely from MPC 700/17, MPC 700/17 was chosen as the holotype (name-bearing) specimen for Tsagantegia longicranialis. Since its description, no additional remains of Tsagantegia longicranialis have been mentioned in scientific literature.

== Description ==
Tsagantegia was a medium to large-sized ankyosaur, with an estimated length of 6 to 7 m (20 to 23 ft) and weighing about 1 to 4 t (2,200 to 8,800 lb). The skull measures about 38 cm (380 mm) in length, with a near width of 25 cm (9.8 in), missing the lower jaws. Unlike other Asian ankylosaurs, in Tsagantegia the caputegulae (cranial ornamentation) are not subdivided into a mosaic of polygons but are amorphous and flattened; they show some degree of symmetry. The quadratojugal, squamosal and orbital horns are poorly preserved, in contrast with other ankylosaurs. The snout was long and flat with a pointed rostrum (beak); each maxilla preserves approximately 18 alveoli, no teeth were preserved. According to Arbour, Tsagantegia differs from Gobisaurus and Shamosaurus based on the more rounded, U-shaped premaxillary beak and the flat ornamentation.

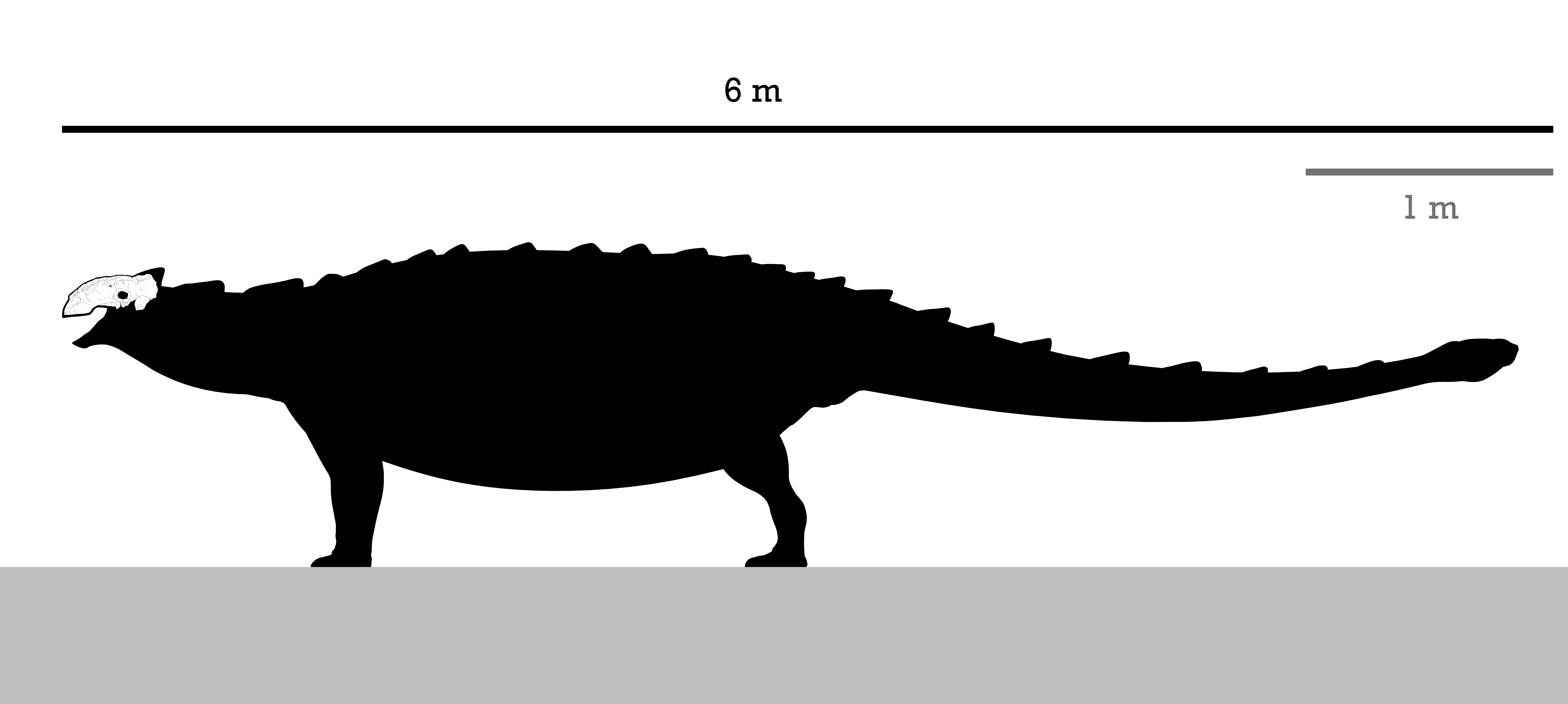
Skeletal diagram of MPC 700/17

== Classification ==
Although fragmentary, the phylogenetic position of Tsagantegia can be established. In 2012, Thompson et al. conducted an analysis of almost all known valid ankylosaurs and outgroup taxa at the time. They based their resulting phylogeny on characters representing cranial, post-cranial, and osteodermal anatomy, and details of synapomorphies for each recovered clade. Tsagantegia was found to be closely related to Pinacosaurus and Shamosaurus. In the performed phylogenetic analysis by Arbour and Currie in 2015, below are the results for the analysis:

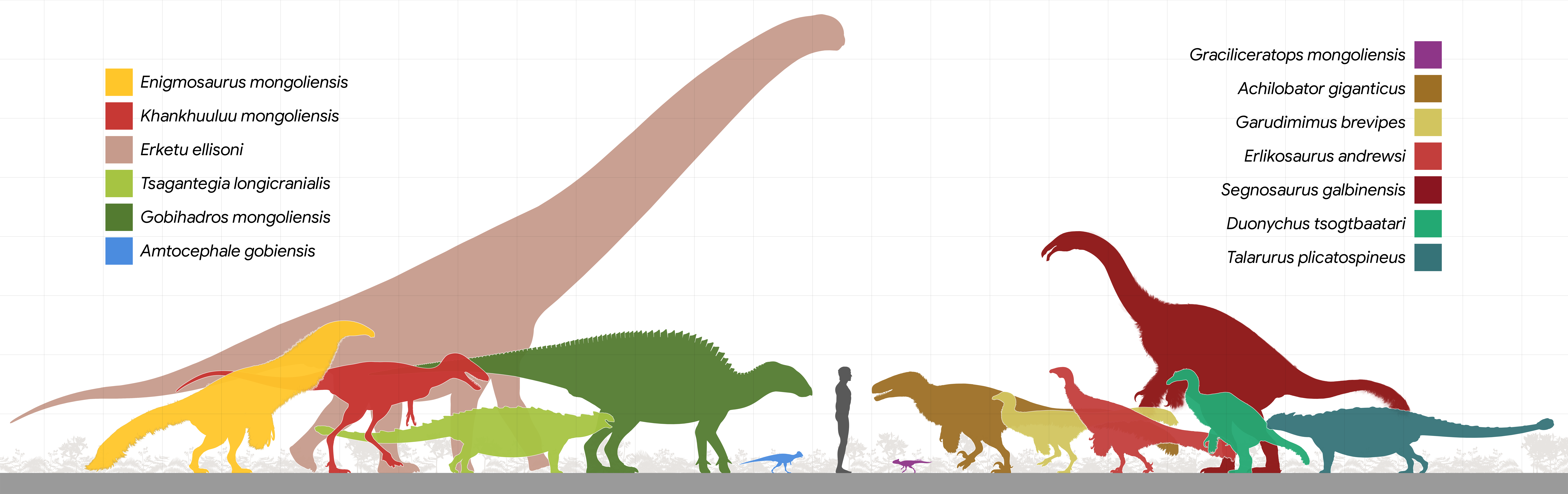
Tsagantegia compared to the Dinosauria of the Bayan Shireh Formation (Tsagantegia in lime, fourth from left)

- Ankylosaurinae
  - Crichtonpelta
  - - Tsagantegia
    - Zhejiangosaurus
    - Pinacosaurus
    - - - Saichania
        - - Tarchia
          - Zaraapelta
      - Ankylosaurini
        - Dyoplosaurus
        - - - Talarurus
            - Nodocephalosaurus
          - - - Ankylosaurus
              - Anodontosaurus
            - Euoplocephalus
            - - Scolosaurus
              - Ziapelta

== Paleoecology ==
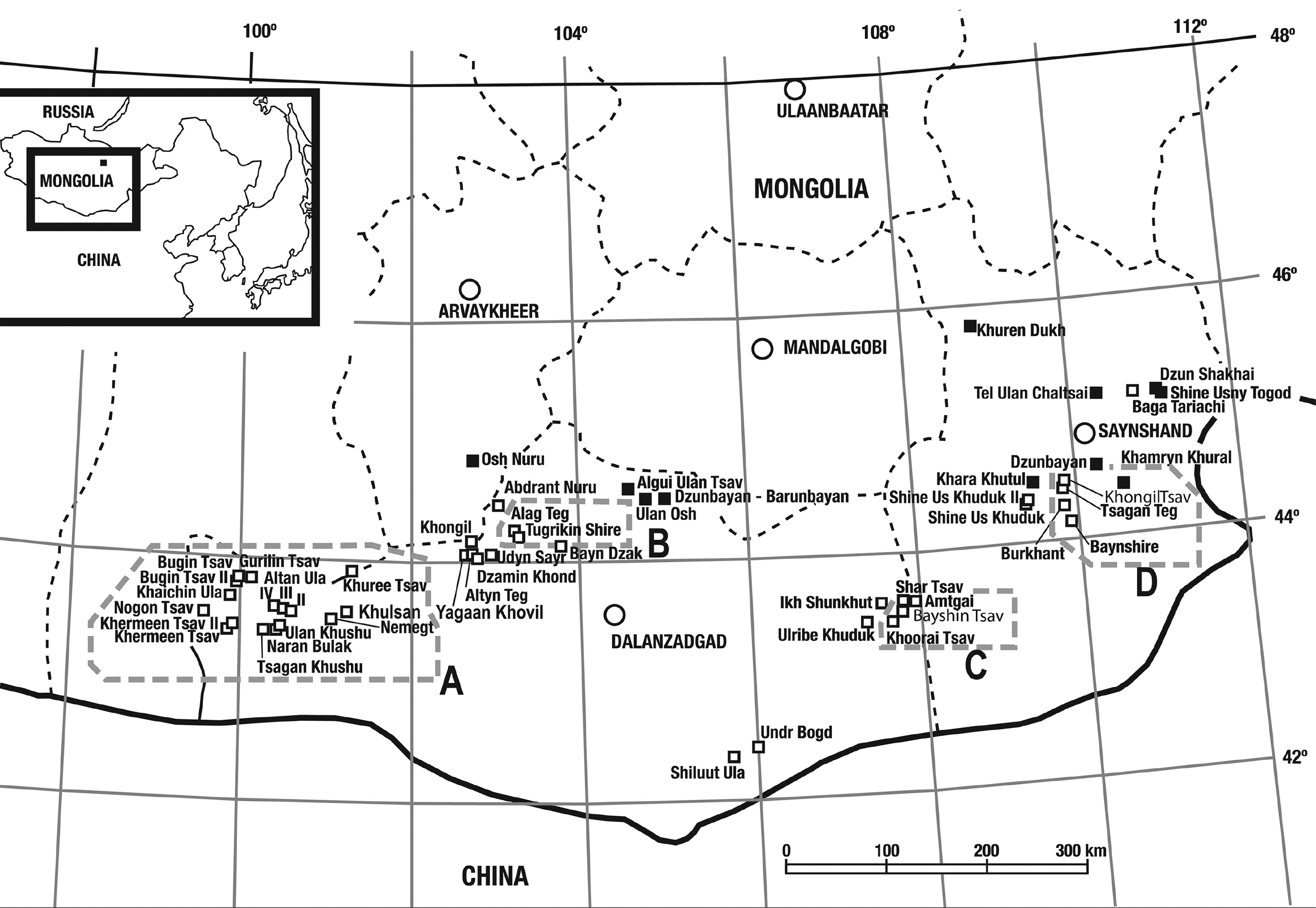
Fossil localities in Mongolia. Locality of Tsagantegia in Tsagan Teg, at Area D

Tsagantegia was unearthed from the Tsagan Teg locality, which represents part of the Upper Bayan Shireh. Calcite U–Pb analyses seem to confirm the age of the Bayan Shireh Formation from 92 million to 86 million years ago, Cenomanian-Santonian ages. Based on comparisons between the snouts of Tsagantegia and the contemporary Talarurus, these taxa were divided by niche partitioning. In a palatal view, the rostra Talarurus have a broad-like, rectangular shape, while Tsagantegia have a more shovel-like shaped rostra. These morphological differences indicate that Tsagantegia filled the niche of a browser herbivore, while Talarurus was a grazer.

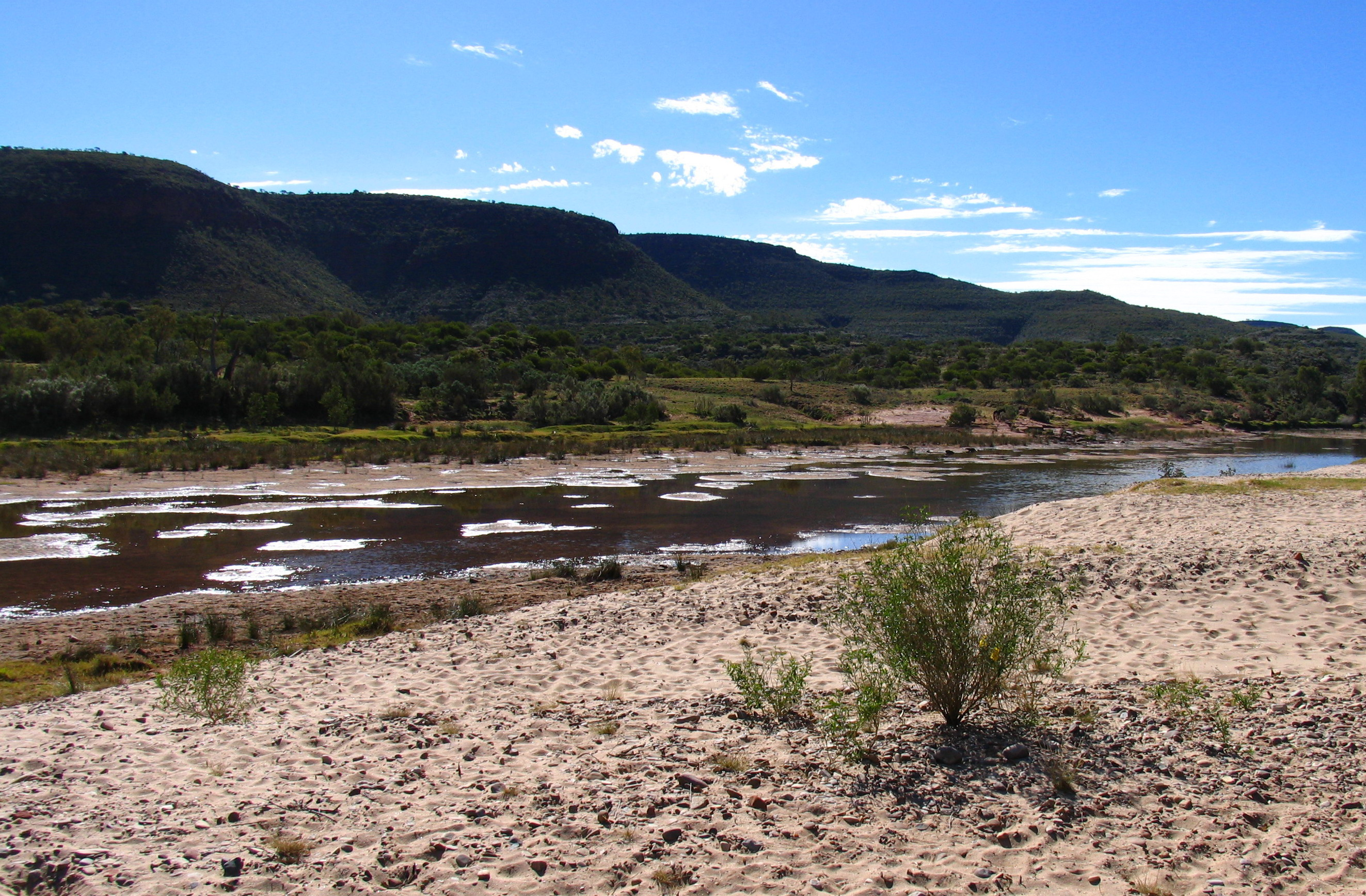
The Bayan Shireh Formation could have looked like the Finke River

Caliche-based boundary indicates a semi-arid environment and climate, but also, the presence of fluvial and lacustrine sediments are indicators of large rivers and lakes. As interpreted by Hicks et al. 1999, during the times of the Bayan Shireh Formation, large rivers drained the eastern part of the Gobi Desert. Additional to this, fossil fruits remains have been recovered from the Bor Guvé and Khara Khutul localities (Upper and Lower Bayan Shireh, respectively), suggesting the presence of Angiosperm plants.

Tsagantegia shared its habitat with numerous animals from other localities of the formation, compromising dinosaur and non-dinosaur genera; such as the theropods Achillobator, Khankhuuluu, Erlikosaurus, Garudimimus and Segnosaurus; the fellow ankylosaur Talarurus; Marginocephalians: Amtocephale and Graciliceratops; the hadrosauroid Gobihadros, and the large sauropod Erketu. The turtle Lindholmemys, the crocodylomorph Paralligator, unnamed azhdarchids and the shark Hybodus.

== See also ==
- Timeline of ankylosaur research
- Cretaceous Mongolia
- Victoria Arbour
