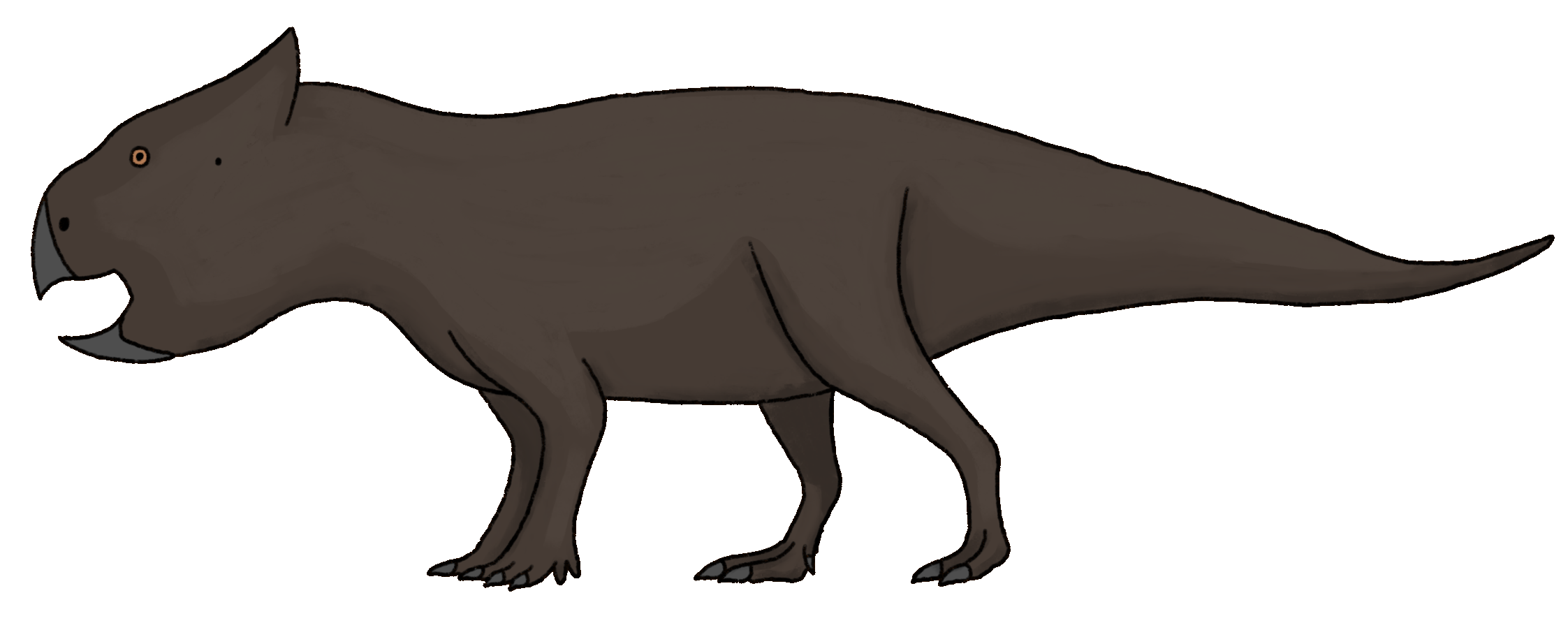
- Asiaceratops reconstruction

Scientific classification
- Kingdom: Animalia
- Phylum: Chordata
- Class: Reptilia
- Clade: Dinosauria
- Clade: †Ornithischia
- Clade: †Ceratopsia
- Clade: †Neoceratopsia
- Genus: †Asiaceratops; Nesov et al., 1989

Type species
- †Asiaceratops salsopaludalis Nesov et al., 1989

Species
- †A. salsopaludalis Nesov et al., 1989; †A. sulcidens (Bohlin, 1953)

Synonyms
- Microceratus sulcidens Bohlin, 1953

= Asiaceratops =

Asiaceratops Temporal range: Early-Late Cretaceous, 125–99 Ma

Extinct genus of dinosaurs

Asiaceratops (meaning "Asian horned face") is a genus of herbivorous ceratopsian dinosaur. It lived during the Early-Late Cretaceous. The type species, A. salsopaludalis is known from Uzbekistan, while A. sulcidens is known from China and Mongolia.

== Discovery and naming ==
The type species, Asiaceratops salsopaludalis, was formally described by Lev Nesov, L.F. Kaznyshkina and Gennadiy Olegovich Cherepanov in 1989. The generic name combines a reference to Asia with ~ceratops, "horned face". The specific name means "of the salt marsh" in Latin. In the same publication Microceratops sulcidens Bohlin 1953 was renamed into a second species of Asiaceratops: Asiaceratops sulcidens.

The holotype of Asiaceratops salsopaludalis, CCMGE 9/12457, was found in Uzbekistan in a layer of the Khodzhakul Formation dating from the early Cenomanian, about ninety-nine million years old. It consists of a part of a left maxilla. Some other fragments were in 1989 referred to the species, among them teeth and a phalanx. In 1995 Nesov referred more material, from three Uzbek sites, mostly skull elements and a partial humerus, of individuals of different ages.

A second species, A. sulcidens, was created to house Microceratus sulcidens. It is known from remains discovered in Early Cretaceous (Aptian-Albian)-aged rocks located in China (Xinminpu Group) and Mongolia and the holotype of A. sulcidens, no inventory number given, consists of two teeth, centra, an incomplete tibia, tarsals and left pes.

Asiaceratops has often been considered a nomen dubium, in view of the limited holotype material. A basicranium tentatively referred to Asiaceratops may show diagnostic characters of the taxon.

== Classification ==
Asiaceratops belonged to the Ceratopsia (the name is Greek for "horned faces"), a group of herbivorous dinosaurs with parrot-like beaks which thrived in North America and Asia during the Cretaceous Period, which ended roughly 66 million years ago. All ceratopsians became extinct at the end of this era.

In 1995 Nesov assigned Asiaceratops to an Asiaceratopsinae of its own. Recent cladistic analyses indicated, despite the presumed status as a nomen dubium, a basal position in the Leptoceratopsidae.

More recent phylogenetic analyses consistently recover Asiaceratops as a basal neoceratopsian outside Leptoceratopsidae.

== Diet ==
Asiaceratops, like all ceratopsians, was a herbivore. During the Cretaceous, flowering plants were "geographically limited on the landscape", and so it is likely that this dinosaur fed on the predominant plants of the era: ferns, cycads, and conifers. It would have used its sharp ceratopsian beak to bite off the leaves or needles.

== See also ==
- Timeline of ceratopsian research
