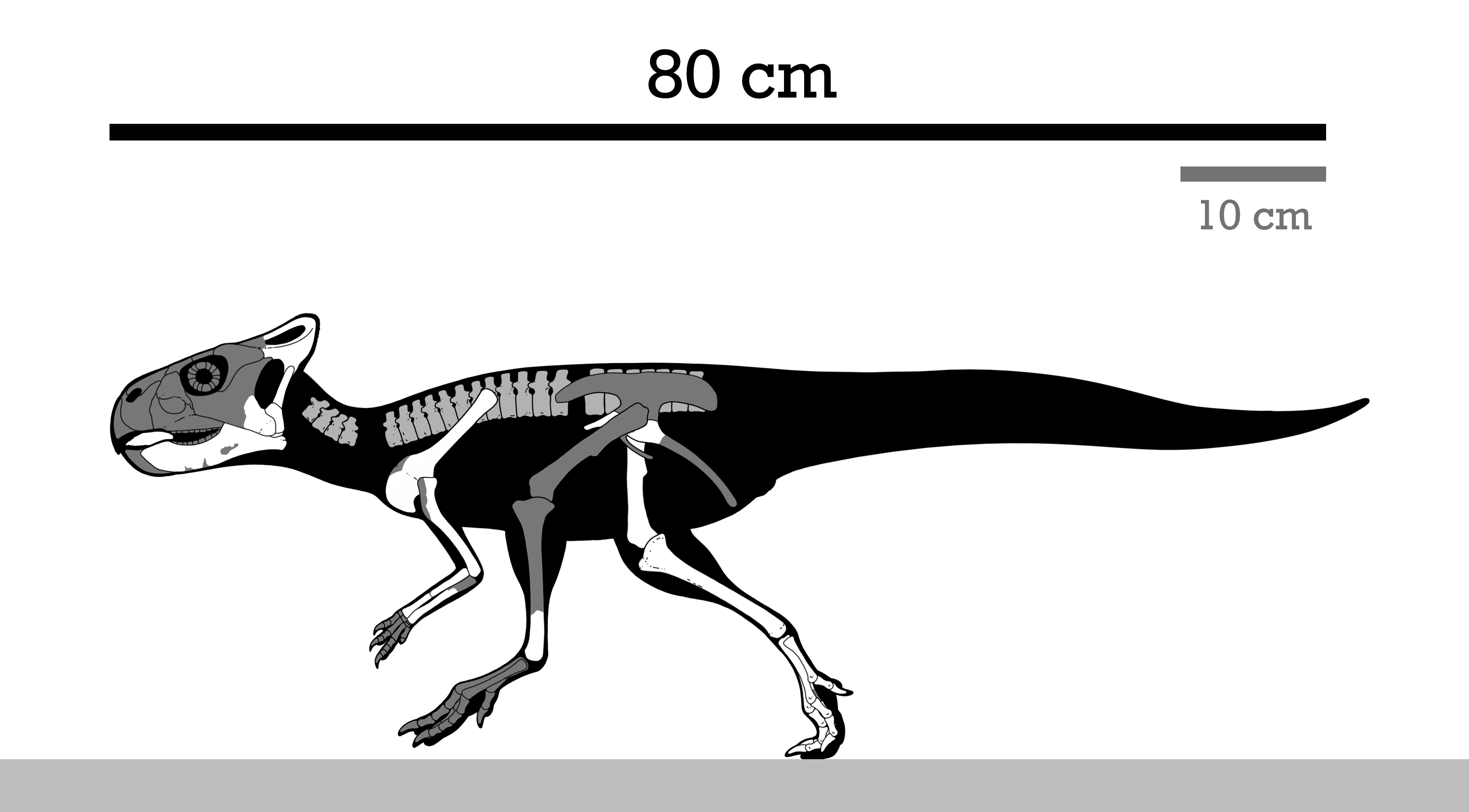
- Skeletal diagram featuring the known elements from the holotype

Scientific classification
- Kingdom: Animalia
- Phylum: Chordata
- Class: Reptilia
- Clade: Dinosauria
- Clade: †Ornithischia
- Clade: †Ceratopsia
- Clade: †Neoceratopsia
- Genus: †Graciliceratops; Sereno, 2000

Type species
- †Graciliceratops mongoliensis Sereno, 2000

= Graciliceratops =

Graciliceratops Temporal range: Late Cretaceous, ~96–89 Ma

Extinct genus of dinosaurs

Graciliceratops (meaning "slender horned face") is a genus of neoceratopsian dinosaurs that lived in Asia during the Late Cretaceous period.

== Discovery and naming ==
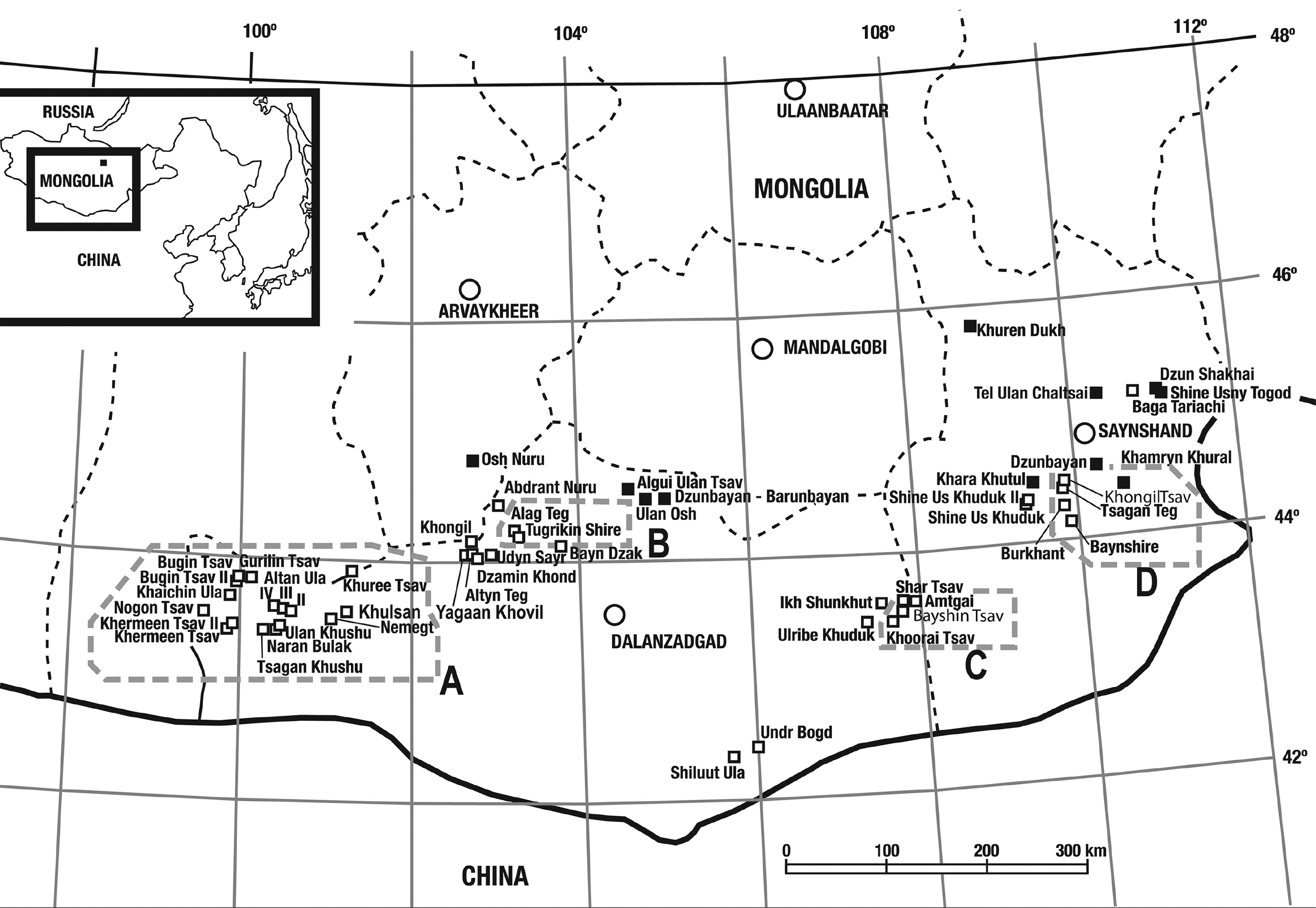
Cretaceous-aged dinosaur fossil localities of Mongolia; Graciliceratops fossils have been collected near Sainshand at area D (right)

The holotype, ZPAL MgD-I/156, was discovered at the Bayan Shireh Formation in Mongolia, coming from the Sheeregeen Gashoon locality near Sainshand. The discoveries were made during field exploration by the Polish-Mongolian Palaeontological Expedition, in 1971. Four years later, in 1975, the specimen was described by Teresa Maryańska and Halszka Osmólska and referred to the genus Microceratops. However, Paul Sereno noted that the referral for this specimen was injustified and overall, the genus lacked diagnosis, therefore, Microceratops (now named Microceratus) was considered a nomen dubium. The referred specimen was redescribed by him, creating a new genus and species: Graciliceratops mongoliensis.

The holotype is fragmentary, consisting of a very fragmented skull with mandibles; vertebrae, four cervicals, twelve dorsals and seven sacrals; right scapula; proximal end of left scapula; left coracoid; right humerus, radius and fragmentary ulna; proximal and distal end of left humerus; proximal fragments of both pubis; fragments of both ilium and fragment of right ischium; right femur, tibia and nearly complete pes; distal part of left tibia, fragmentary left pes; tarsals and isolated ribs. The generic name, Graciliceratops, is derived from the Latin gracilis (meaning "slender") and the Greek keras (meaning "horn") and ops (meaning "face") in reference to its fragile build. Lastly, the specific name, mongoliensis, is to emphasize the place of its discovery: Mongolia.

== Description ==
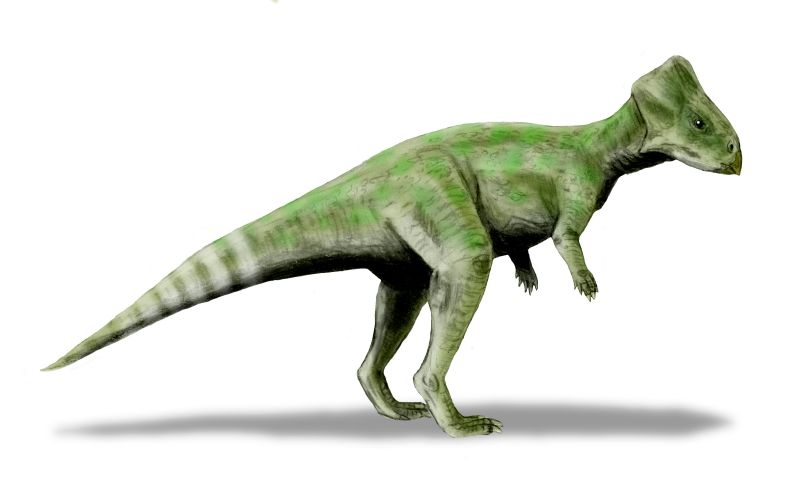
Life restoration

Although very damaged, the skull measures approximately 20 cm (200 mm), the arches and centra of the sacral vertebrae are not fused, which indicates that this specimen was not fully grown when it died, probably a juvenile individual. Its size is estimated at 60 cm (2.0 ft) long with a weight between 2.27 to 9.1 kg (5.0 to 20.1 lb). However, due to the immature nature of the specimen, the adult size is estimated around 2 m (6.6 ft), or similar to Protoceratops. The frill has large fenestrae bounded by very slender struts. This structure is very similar to that of the later Protoceratops. Graciliceratops is recognised by the fragile frill and characteristic tibial-femoral ratio (1.2:1); the frill is also briefly elongated with well developed squamosal processes. Seven sacral vertebrae were identified and not fused. The scapula is very gracile in constitution but thicker at the glenoid, with a relatively large coracoid; the humerus is also very slender. The femur measures 9.5 cm (95 mm), it is lightly curved and has a large head; the fourth trochanter is fragile and place above the midlength of the femoral end. Being larger than the femur, the tibia measures 11 cm (110 mm) and its proximal articulation is more developed than distally. The right pes is virtually complete, only lacking the distal end of the IV metatarsal. The pedal unguals are dorsoventrally flattened and somewhat sharply-developed.

== Classification ==
During the description of Aquilops in 2014, an extensive Ceratopsia phylogenetic analysis was conducted. Graciliceratops was found to be a basal neoceratopsian. Below are the results obtained for the Neoceratopsia:

- Coronosauria
  - Graciliceratops
  - - Protoceratopsidae
      - Protoceratops
      - Bagaceratops
    - Ceratopsoidea
      - Zuniceratops
      - - Turanoceratops
        - Ceratopsidae
          - - Chasmosaurus
            - Triceratops
          - - Diabloceratops
            - Centrosaurus

== Paleoecology ==
Graciliceratops was unearthed from the Sheeregeen Gashoon beds, which are part of the Upper Bayan Shireh. The presence of caliche, fluvial and lacustrine sediments, indicate a semiarid climate with rivers and large lakes around the zone. Fossilized fruits have also been recovered from the upper and lower parts of the formation, suggesting the existence of Angiosperm plants. Magnetostratigraphic and calcite U–Pb analyses indicate that the formation lies within the Cretaceous Long Normal, which was deposited until the end of the Santonian around 95.9 ± 6.0 million to 89.6 ± 4.0 million years ago.

It lived alongside other dinosaurs from the upper part, most notably the large dromaeosaurid Achillobator, the tyrannosauroid Khankhuuluu, therizinosaurs Erlikosaurus, Enigmosaurus, and Segnosaurus, the pachycephalosaur Amtocephale, the ornithomimosaur Garudimimus, the ankylosaurs Talarurus, Amtosaurus, Maleevus, and Tsagantegia, the large sauropod Erketu and the basal hadrosauroid Gobihadros. Additional paleofauna has been recovered, expanding the aquatic biodiversity: Paralligator, Lindholmemys and the shark Hybodus. The discoveries of azhdarchids pterosaurs have been reported from at least two locations, compromising mainly cervical vertebrae.

== See also ==
- Timeline of ceratopsian research
- Microceratus
