= Bayshinoryctes =

Bayshinoryctes Temporal range: Turonian–Santonian

Scientific classification
- Kingdom: Animalia
- Phylum: Chordata
- Class: Mammalia
- Clade: Eutheria
- Genus: †Bayshinoryctes
- Species: †B. shuvalovi

Binomial name
- †Bayshinoryctes shuvalovi Lopatin & Averianov, 2023

Bayshinoryctes is an extinct genus of eutherian mammal that lived during the Late Cretaceous epoch.

== Distribution ==
Bayshinoryctes shuvalovi is known exclusively from fossils from the Bayan Shireh Formation of Mongolia.
