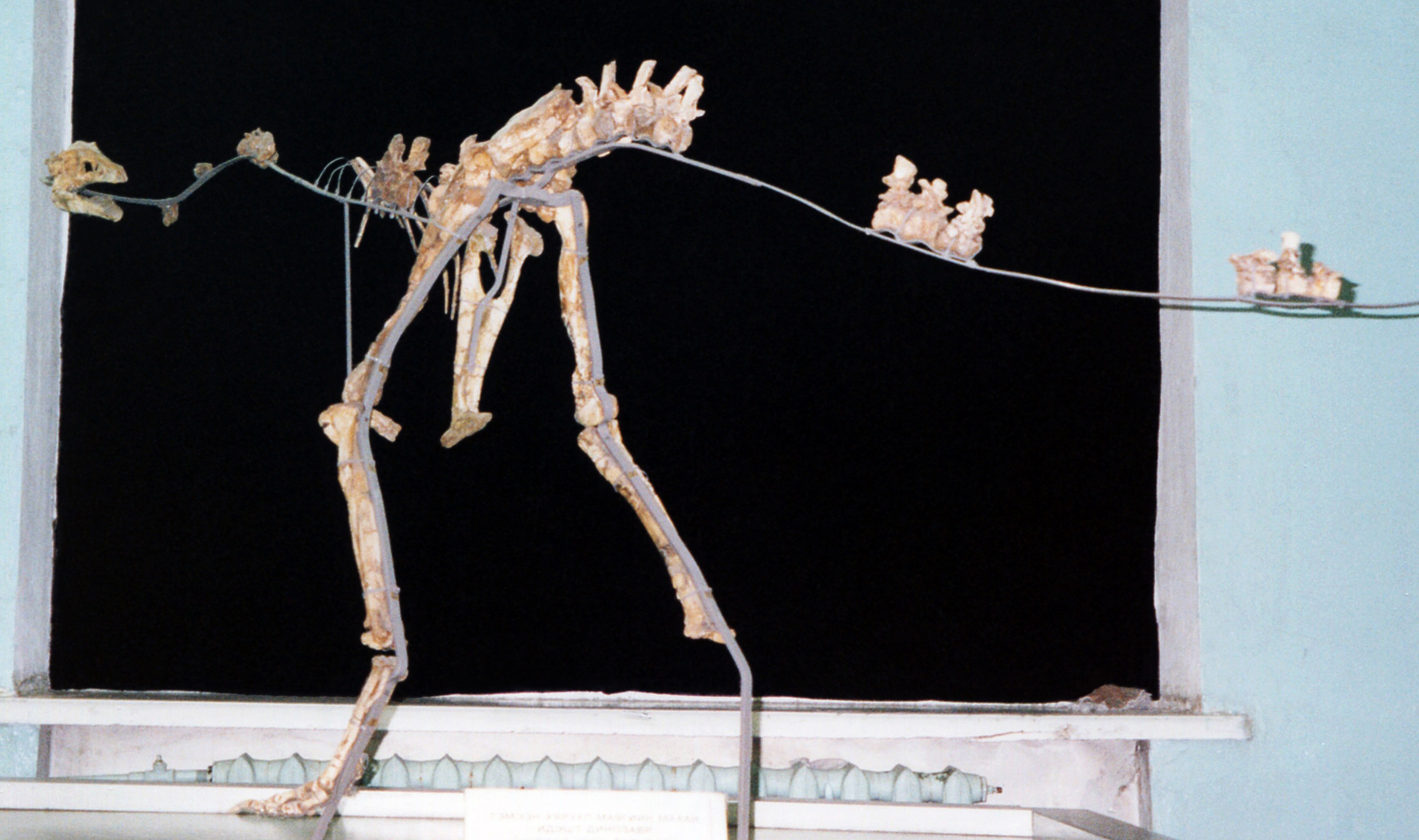
- Mounted holotype in the Mongolian Natural History Museum during 2002 (note incorrect number of caudal vertebrae; only four are reported in the holotype)

Scientific classification
- Kingdom: Animalia
- Phylum: Chordata
- Class: Reptilia
- Clade: Dinosauria
- Clade: Saurischia
- Clade: Theropoda
- Clade: †Ornithomimosauria
- Clade: †Macrocheiriformes
- Superfamily: †Ornithomimoidea
- Genus: †Garudimimus; Barsbold, 1981

Type species
- †Garudimimus brevipes Barsbold, 1981

= Garudimimus =

Garudimimus Temporal range: Late Cretaceous, ~96–89 Ma

Ornithomimosaur genus from the Late Cretaceous

Garudimimus (meaning "Garuda mimic") is a genus of ornithomimosaur that lived in Asia during the Late Cretaceous. The genus is known from a single specimen found in 1981 by a Soviet-Mongolian paleontological expedition in the Bayanshiree Formation and formally described in the same year by Rinchen Barsbold; the only species is Garudimimus brevipes. Several interpretations about the anatomical traits of Garudimimus were made in posterior examinations of the specimen, but most of them were criticized during its comprehensive redescription in 2005. Extensive undescribed ornithomimosaur remains at the type locality of Garudimimus may represent additional specimens of the genus.

The only known specimen of Garudimimus was a medium-sized animal measuring nearly 3.5 m (11.5 ft) in length and weighing about 77.3–98 kg (170–216 lb). It was an ornithomimosaur with a mix of basal and derived features; unlike primitive ornithomimosaurs, both upper and lower jaws were toothless, a trait that is often reported in more derived ornithomimids. Garudimimus had relatively short and stocky hindlimbs, robust feet, and a reduced ilia. The foot had four toes with the first one very reduced, whereas ornithomimids were three-toed with the first toe lost. The toothless skull has very straight jaws ending in a more rounded snout tip than that of other genera. It was previously thought that this primitive ornithomimosaurian possessed a lacrimal "horn" at the top of the skull, in front of the eye socket. However, the redescription of the only specimen has shown that this structure was simply the distorted left prefrontal bone. Another early interpretation was the metatarsus reconstructed with an arctometatarsalian condition.

With the first description in 1981, Garudimimus was identified as a primitive ornithomimosaurian within its own family. However, with the description of new specimens of Deinocheirus in 2014, it was found that the latter was the sister taxon of Garudimimus, grouping within the Deinocheiridae—ornithomimosaurs not adapted for running or agile movements. This placement has been disputed, though. The pelvic girdle and hindlimbs of Garudimimus show that the musculature of the legs was not as well-developed as in the fast-running ornithomimids, therefore, indicating poor cursorial capacities. Like other members of Ornithomimosauria, Garudimimus was an omnivore/herbivore with a reduced bite force that was compensated by a horny beak.

== History of discovery ==
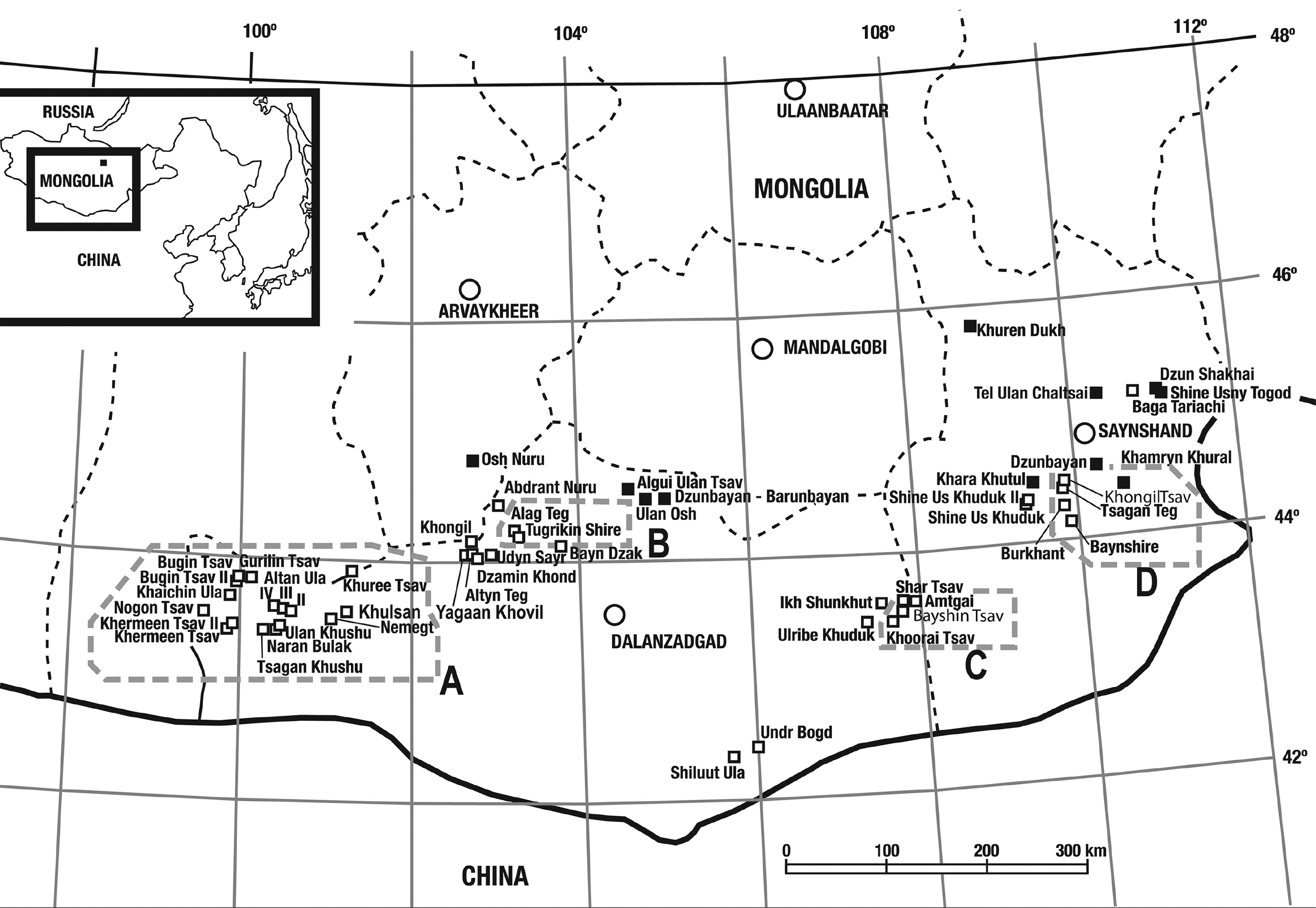
Cretaceous-aged dinosaur fossil localities of Mongolia; Garudimimus fossils have been collected in the Bayshin Tsav locality of area C (Bayan Shireh Formation)

In 1981, during a Soviet-Mongolian paleontological expedition to the Gobi Desert, a relatively small theropod skeleton was discovered by the team at Bayshin Tsav in the Late Cretaceous Bayan Shireh Formation, Southeastern Mongolia. The remains are catalogued as MPC-D 100/13 (Mongolian Palaeontological Center; originally GIN 100/13) and represent a rather complete and articulated skeleton. In the same year this specimen was formally and briefly described by the Mongolian paleontologist Rinchen Barsbold as the holotype of the genus and species Garudimimus brevipes. The generic name, Garudimimus, combines a reference to Garuda which are legendary winged creatures from Mongolian Buddhist mythology and Latin mimus (meaning mimic). The specific name is derived from Latin brevis (meaning short) and pes (meaning foot), referring to the short metatarsus. Barsbold identified Garudimimus as an ornithomimosaurian taxon but noted it was more primitive than ornithomimids and gave it its own family, the Garudimimidae. Barsbold described additional remains of the holotype specimen in 1983, and later in 1990 with Halszka Osmólska.

The holotype consist of the skull in its entirety, 8 cervical vertebrae (including the atlas and axis), 9 dorsal vertebrae, 6 sacral vertebrae and 4 caudal vertebrae, some ribs, both ilia, pubes, femora, tibiae, fibulae, and a virtually complete left pes of a sub-adult individual.

In 1988 the North American author Gregory S. Paul illustrated Garudimimus with a prominent nasal horn unlike any other ornithomimosaur, considering this feature as actually preserved. Another interpretation was made also in 1988 by Philip J. Currie and Dale Alan Russell who referred the metatarsus of the holotype to Oviraptor sp. and reconstructed it with an arctometatarsal—a condition where the upper end of the third metatarsal is narrowed between the surrounding metatarsals—structure. In 1992 Thomas R. Holtz followed this interpretation and suggested the metatarsus could have been arctometatarsalian and was just disarticulated as preserved. Supporting an arctometatarsalian condition, Currie and David A. Eberth in 1993 claimed that part of the Archaeornithomimus (an ornithomimosaur from the nearby Iren Dabasu Formation) material belonged to Garudimimus based on the assumed arctometatarsalian condition, presence of the vestigial digit I and the proportions of metatarsals II, III, and IV. They pointed out that the metatarsals are crushed and metatarsal III is set back from the extensor surface of metatarsus. In 1994 Holtz suggested some similarities between the metatarsus of Garudimimus and Chirostenotes.

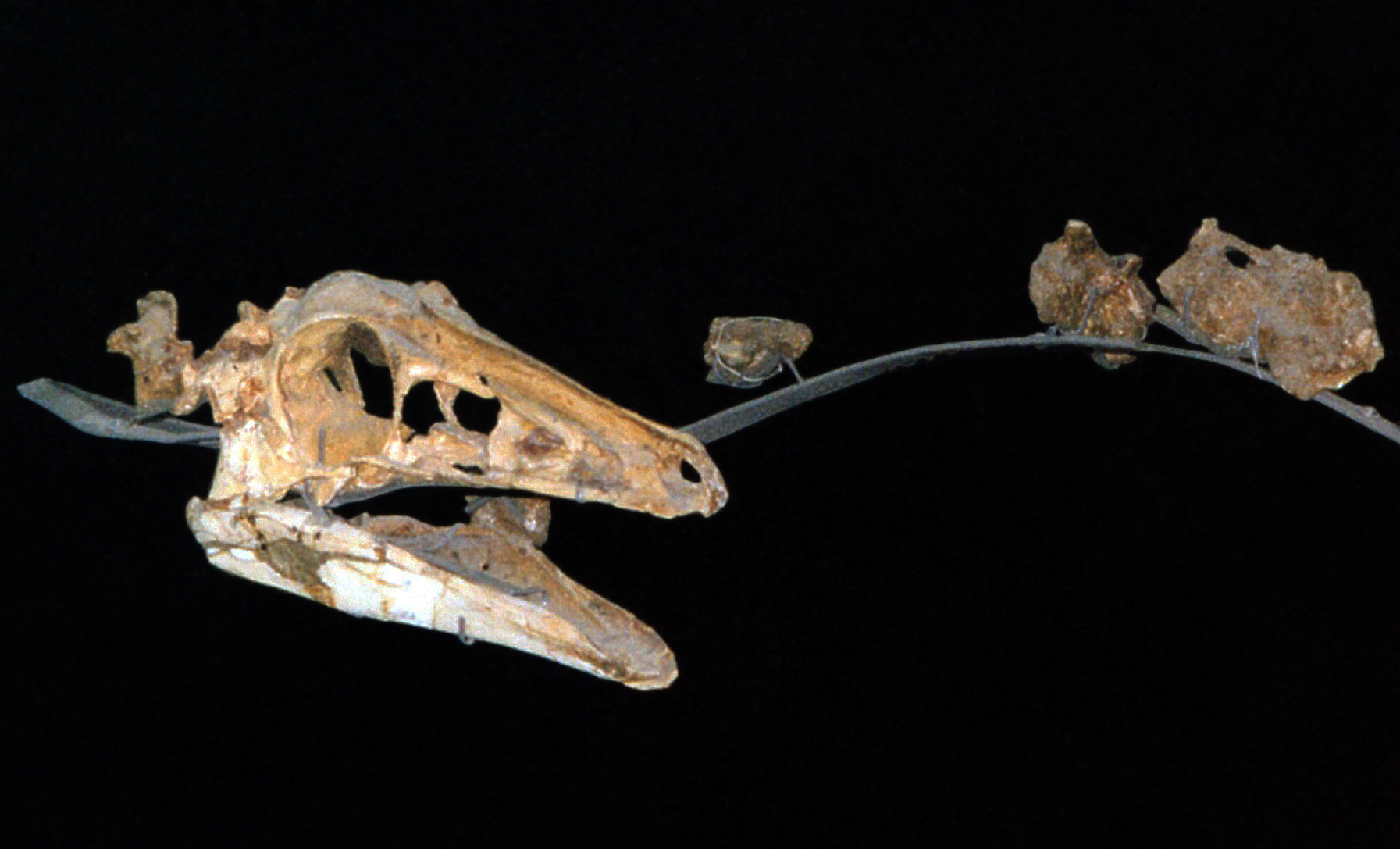
Mounted holotype skull at the Mongolian Natural History Museum

In 1994, Bernardino P. Pérez-Moreno with colleagues described the primitive ornithomimosaur Pelecanimimus and identified the presence of a crest in the holotype specimen. They claimed a similar trait in Garudimimus which was represented by a nasal horn. In a comprehensive redescription in 2005 at the hands of Yoshitsugu Kobayashi and Barsbold, numerous of the previous statements were refuted. The supposed orbital horn is actually the disarticulated left prefrontal bone and verified that the metatarsus did not suffer taphonomical (changes during decay and fossilisation) distortion and is non-arctometatarsalian. Moreover, Kobayashi previously showed that in addition to actually lacking an arctometatarsalian condition, the metatarsal ratios are different to Archaeornithomimus.

Although Garudimimus is solely known from MPC-D 100/13, additional specimens may potentially be present among a large bonebed composed of at least five individuals in Bayshin Tsav and several undescribed ornithomimosaurs from other localities in the Bayan Shireh Formation.

== Description ==
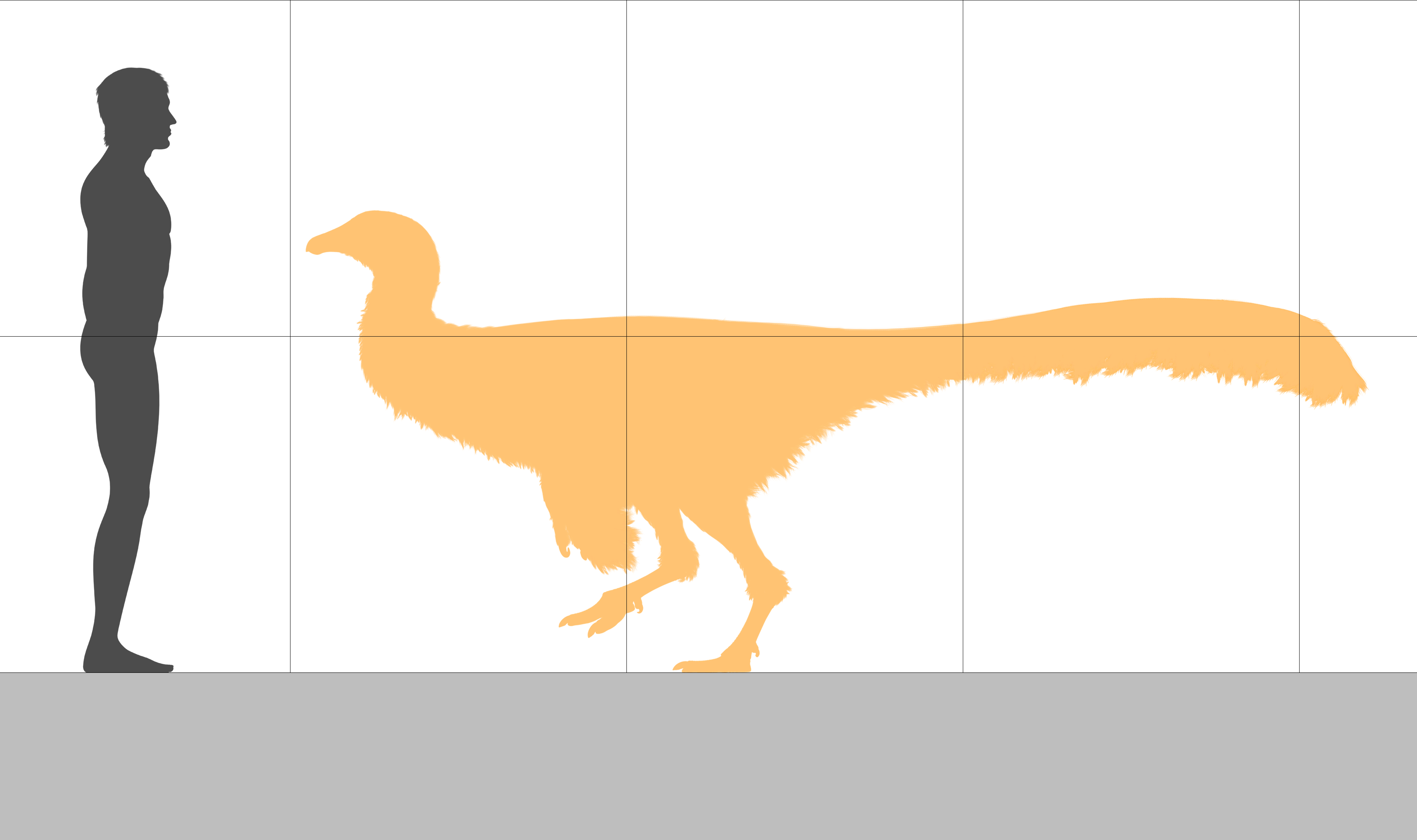
Size comparison of the holotype

Garudimimus (based on the holotype specimen) is estimated to have been around 3.5 m (11.5 ft) weighing approximately 77.3–98 kg (170–216 lb). Several unfused vertebrae indicates that the holotype was likely a still-growing sub-adult animal. Some of the distinguishing traits of this taxon include the jaw articulation positioned more backwards than the postorbital bar (arched bone around the orbit, also referred as the postorbital), depressions on the upper surface of the supraoccipital at the back of the skull, paired depressions on the lateral surfaces of the neural spines of the anterior caudal vertebrae, and a deep groove at the upper end of lateral surface of pedal phalanges III-1 and III-2 (first and second phalanxes of the third digit of the foot).

Based on feather impressions of several specimens of Ornithomimus, Garudimimus likely developed a shaggy feathering mostly similar to that of large paleognath birds such as ratites.

=== Skull ===
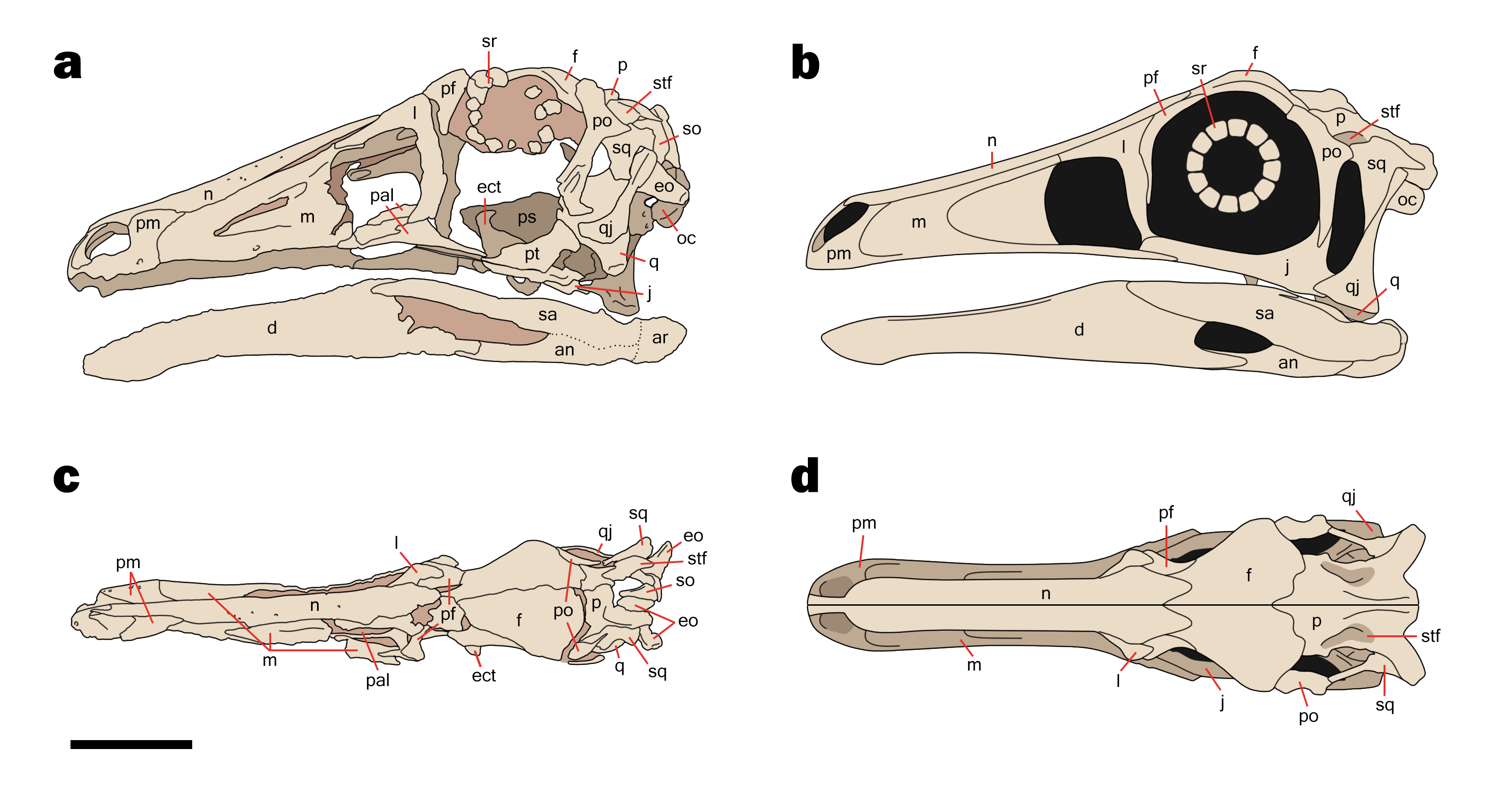
Original (left) and reconstructed (right) holotype skull in (a-b) lateral views, and (c-d) top views

Garudimimus had a rather small skull in proportion to the overall skeleton, and both jaws were edentulous (devoid of teeth). The skull was about 25 cm (250 mm) long with a width of 4.6 cm (46 mm). The eye socket was a large cavity with a height of 6.1 cm (61 mm) wide. The radius of the scleral ring (bony plates that support the eyeball) was approximately 2.86 cm (28.6 mm) long inside and 4.12 cm (41.2 mm) outside. The breadth of each plate was about 0.8 cm (8.0 mm). The infratemporal fenestra (an opening behind the eye socket) had an irregular, nearly oval-shaped. In front of the eye socket there was the antorbital fenestra, a large and rather irregular opening. The maxilla was an elongated bone and had a roughened lateral surface, which was common in ornithomimosaurs. Both promaxillary and maxillary fenestrae (small openings in the maxilla) were poorly developed—almost absent—in Garudimimus. The bottom edges of the premaxilla were thin and sharply-developed. On the lateral sides of this bone, numerous foramina (small holes) were located, a trait more characteristic of derived ornithomimids. The edentulous condition of both premaxilla and dentary with the addition of numerous foramina in their surfaces, indicate that a prominent rhamphotheca (horny beak) was present in life. The nostrils were moderately long and turned upwards. They were surrounded and mainly formed by the nasal bone, which had a narrow end that extended up above the eye sockets.

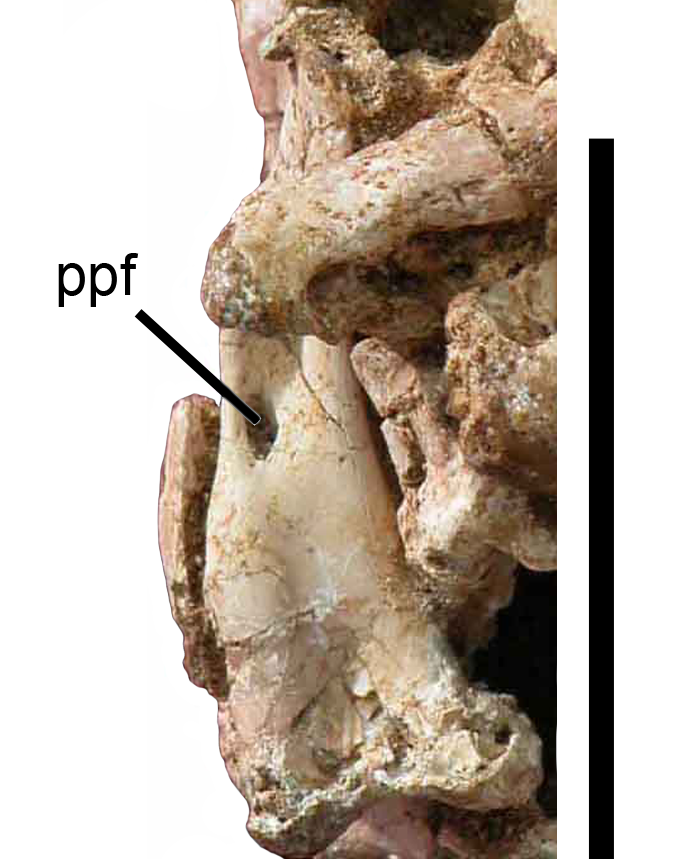
Left quadrate bone of the holotype featuring the posterior pneumatic foramen

The lacrimal bone was semi T-shaped and located in front of the eye. The prefrontal bone was a thin and delicate bone that contributed to the overall shape of the eye socket. In a top view, the frontals were triangular and formed the upper borders of the eye socket. Both frontals together formed a single dome-like structure. The posterior border of the eye socket was formed by the postorbital, which was a sharply-developed bone of well-distributed thickness in lateral view. The jugal had a triangular main body with very thin-walled processes (bony extensions); it also gave form to the lower border of the eye socket. The quadratojugal was a large and triangular-shaped bone, contrasting with the L-shaped quadratojugal of most ornithomimosaurs. On its posterior surface, the quadrate had a large, oval-shaped depression positioned at its mid-height. A small pneumatic foramen (hole) was also present in the bottom area of the depression. The dentary was the longest mandibular element measuring 18.3 cm (183 mm) long and was thickened towards the end. The front of both dentaries was shovel-like and had well-developed cutting edges. Numerous foramina were developed on the lateral surfaces of the dentary tip. The surangular was the second large mandibular element and formed the upper border of the mandibular fenestra (a hole in the lower jaw). Compared to the two latter bones, the angular was much smaller and formed the lower border of this fenestra.

=== Postcranial skeleton ===
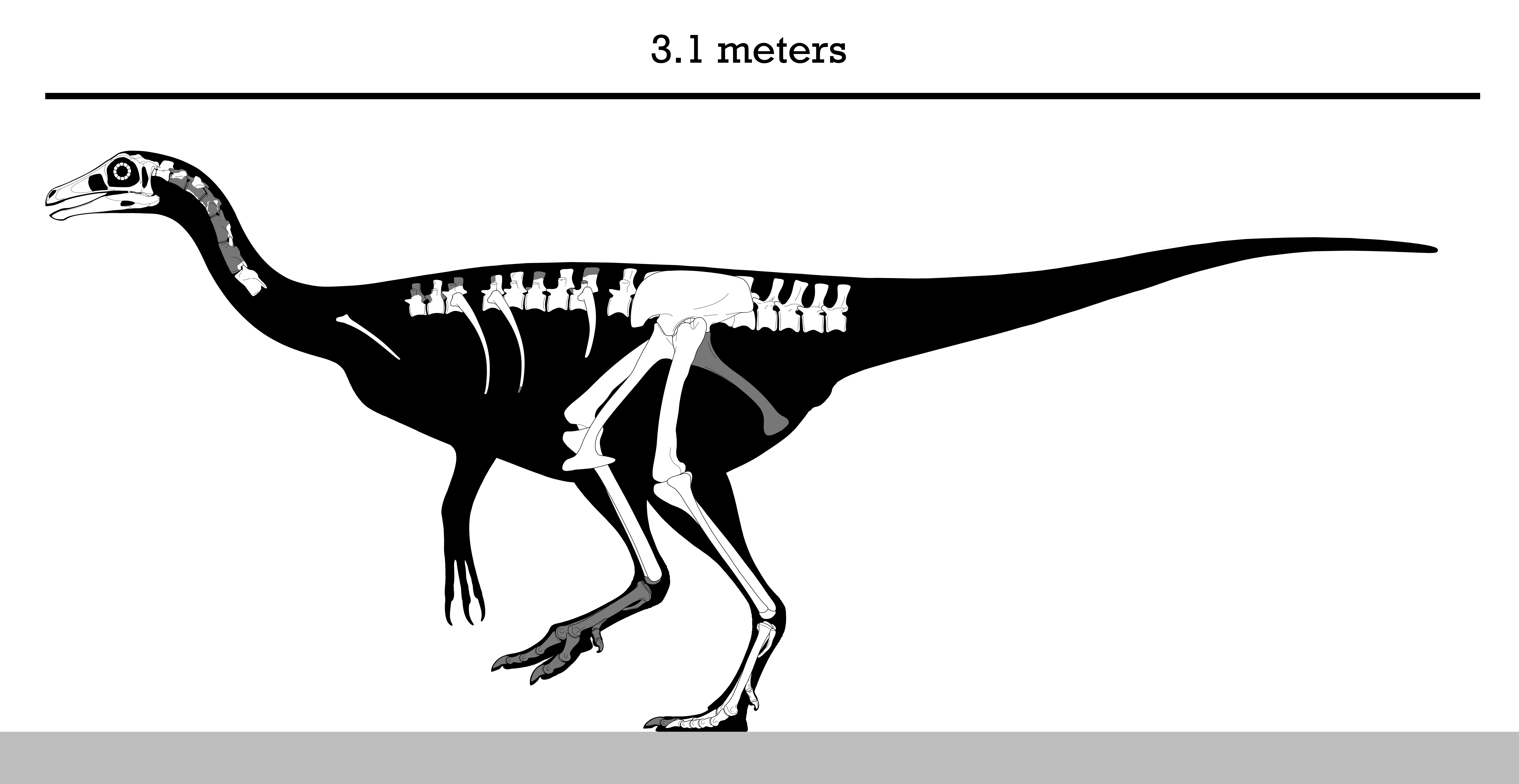
Skeletal diagram showing known elements of the holotype

The complete vertebral column of Garudimimus is not known. The intercentrum and neural arch of the atlas were downwards-directed. The central length of the axis was rather short, measuring approximately 3 cm (30 mm) long and 1.8 cm (18 mm) high—probably a primitive condition in ornithomimosaurs. Its posterior articular surface was concave and taller than wide. Its neural spine was tall and very rounded, and its neural arch had a pneumatic fossa (depression) at the mid-length of its centrum (body). The neural spines of most cervical vertebrae were narrow and directed towards the end. The dorsal vertebrae progressively increased in size towards the end and along with the size, the neural spines became progressively taller in posterior dorsals with nearly equal lengths. In a lateral view, all spines were slightly inclined towards the end. The dorsal centra lacked pneumatization and were larger in more posterior vertebrae, having amphicoelous (strongly concave) facets.

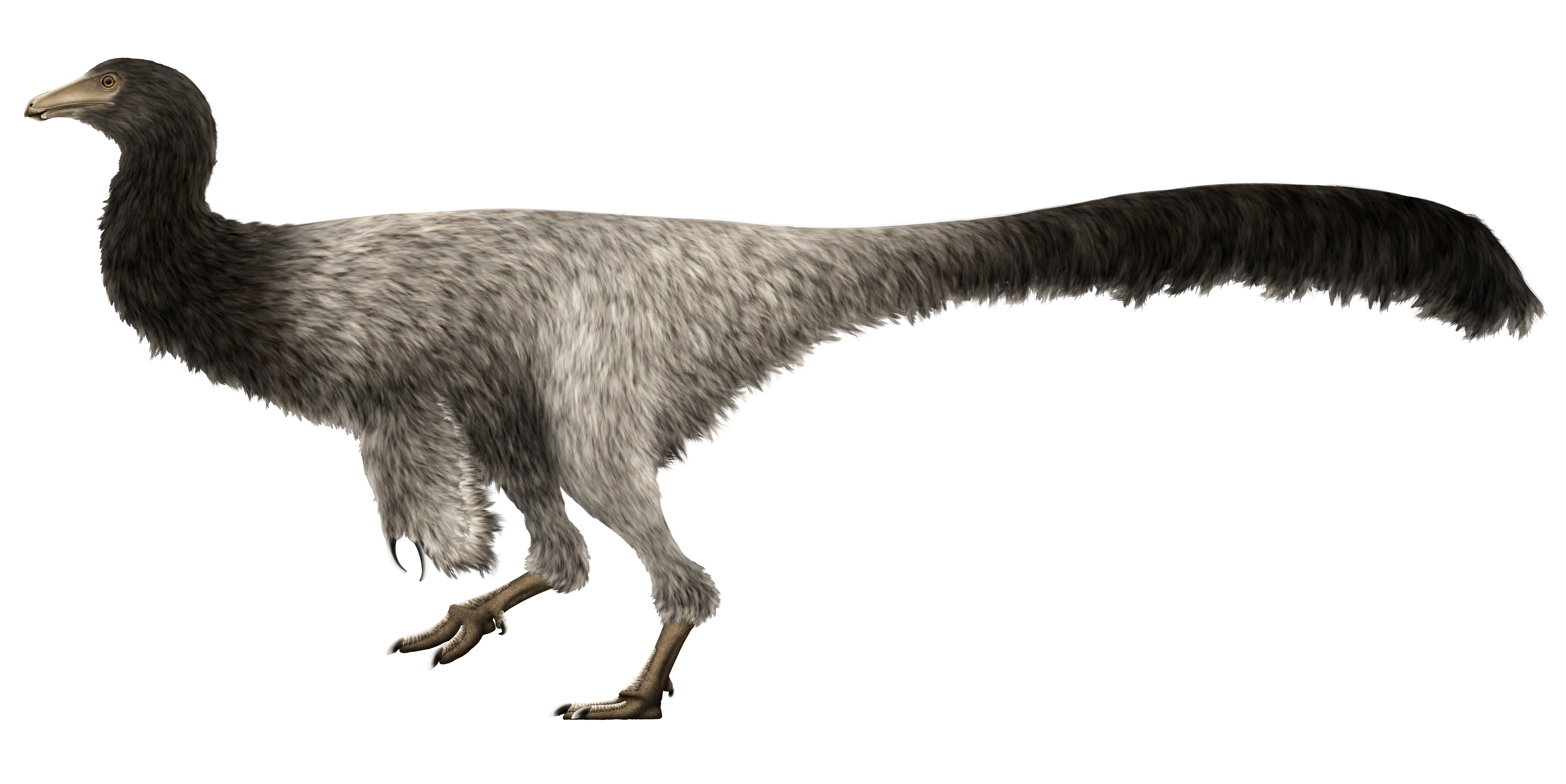
Life restoration

The sacrum was composed of six sacral vertebrae of which the first and sixth had sacral ribs attached to the inner surface of the ilium. The total length of the sacrum (31 cm (310 mm)) was nearly equal to that of the ilium. Most sacral centra were roughly equal in length except for the fourth one. Unlike other ornithomimosaurs, the sacral vertebrae lacked pneumatization (air-spaced). The caudal neural spines became progressively shorter and had straight and horizontal top borders. The caudal vertebrae had paired projections on either side of the sulci (fissures) for the chevron articulation. Putative large foramen and deep fossae (depressions) were present on the anterior neural arches, which may indicate caudal pneumaticity in Garudimimus.

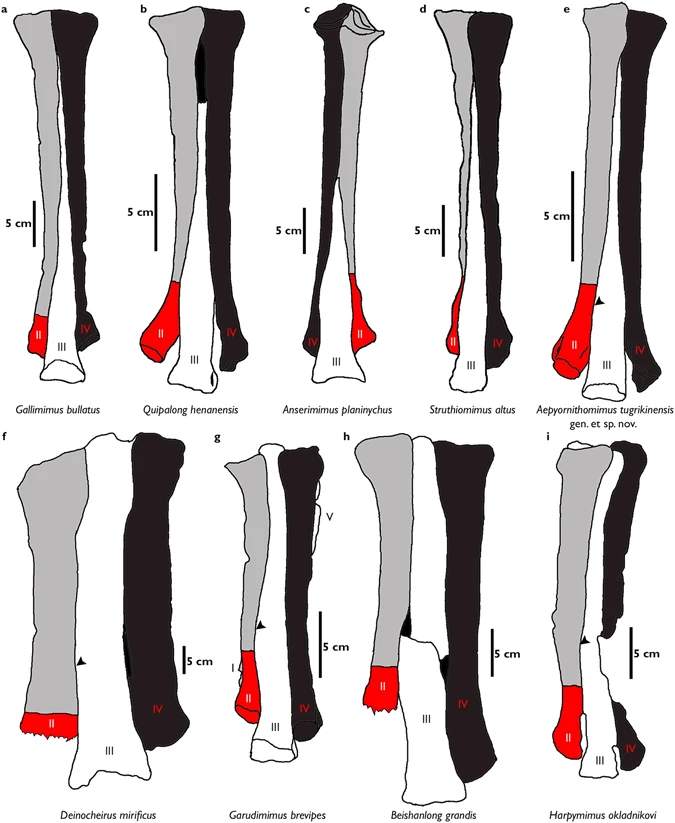
Non-arctometatarsalian vs. arctometatarsalian condition in ornithomimosaurs; Garudimimus in g

The ribs had a short tuberculum (upper head) and long capitulum (lower head), and the gastralia (belly ribs) were segmented into lateral and inner parts. Most sacral ribs were poorly developed. The pelvic girdle was formed by the ilium, pubis, and ischium. Though the latter is unknown in Garudimimus. The ilium was a large bone—yet short compared to ornithomimids—with a hook-shaped anterior end. The pubis was a large element measuring 39 cm (390 mm) in length. It had a nearly straight shaft and a prominent pubic boot (large projection at the end). The femur was relatively straight and had a length of 37.1 cm (371 mm). It had a well-developed femoral head and a sideways flattened shaft. Both tibia and fibula were nearly equal in length to the femur (36 cm (360 mm) and 38.8 cm (388 mm) respectively). The tibia was more flattened than other limb elements and the shaft was very thin. The astragalus and calcaneum were attached to the lower sides of the tibia.

In the pes (foot) formula, Garudimimus strongly differed from the ornithomimid condition by having five metatarsals. The first metatarsal was the smallest element of the metatarsus and had a more flattened and pinched shape. The second and fourth metatarsals were subequal in length, and the third metatarsal was the longest (22.9 cm (229 mm) long). The latter was not pinched at its upper end, therefore indicating a non-arctometatarsalian condition in Garudimimus. This trait is partially shared with the large Beishanlong and Deinocheirus. The fifth metatarsal was a very reduced and thin element that had no functional significance and was attached to the posterior surface of the fourth metatarsal. The feet had four primitive digits (toes) with the first being the smallest. Most phalanges were very similar in shape being expanded in their anterior and posterior ends with rounded lateral condyles, and had concave anterior articular surfaces. They become progressively shorter from the second to the fourth digit. Pedal unguals (claw bones) had a recurved shape that differed from the straight shape in ornithomimids, and prominent flexor tubercles (flexor tendons attachments).

== Classification ==
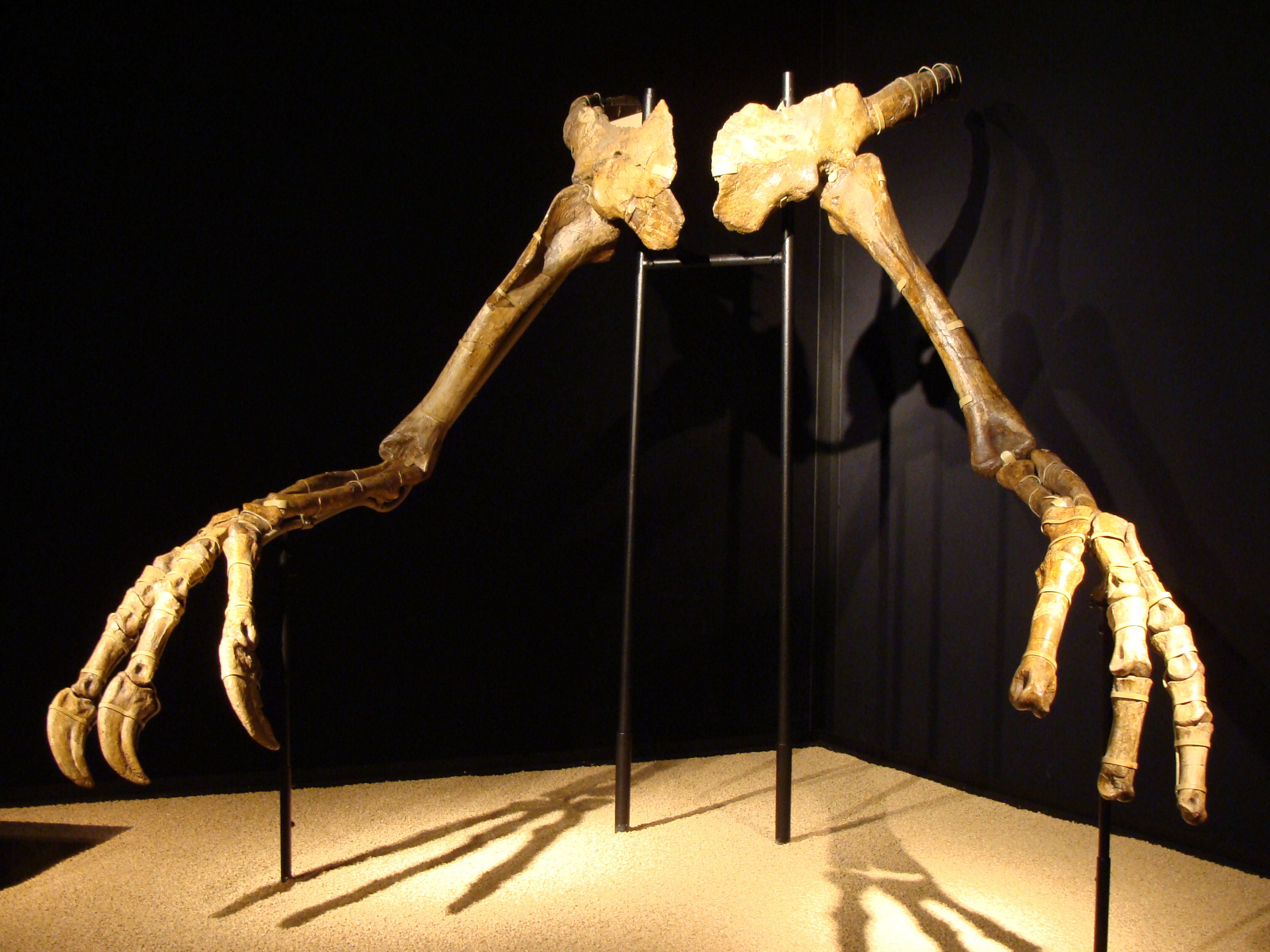
Holotype arms of Deinocheirus, which together with their size generated uncertainties about the identity of this taxon

In 1981, Barsbold assigned Garudimimus to a separate Garudimimidae given the unusual traits in the taxon. However, he identified these as clearly primitive. With the redescription of the holotype in 2005, more diagnostic characters for Garudimimus were provided. Kobayashi and Barsbold noted that this taxon shared traits with primitive and derived ornithomimosaurs such as four-toed feet and toothless jaws. Their phylogenetic analysis recovered Ornithomimidae as the sister taxon of Garudimimus. In 2014, new and fairly complete specimens of the long-enigmatic Deinocheirus were described by Yuong-Nam Lee and colleagues. The remains showed that Deinocheirus was in fact an ornithomimosaur taxon—but aberrantly different—and also allowed to define the older Deinocheiridae as the family including all taxa sharing a more recent common ancestor with Deinocheirus than with Ornithomimus. Lee and team performed a large phylogenetic analysis for the Deinocheiridae and the three members were found in this grouping: Beishanlong, Garudimimus and Deinocheirus. Their relationships were mainly represented by various anatomical features in the limbs, but the latter two were strongly related as they both have skull and body remains. The resulting cladogram suggested that ornithomimosaurian dinosaurs diverged into two major lineages in the Early Cretaceous: Deinocheiridae and Ornithomimidae. Unlike the fast-running ornithomimids, deinocheirids were not built for running. The anatomical traits of Deinocheirus compared to other ornithomimosaurs can be explained by the notable large sizes achieved in this taxon.

More recently, in 2019 Hartman and colleagues described the new paravian Hesperornithoides performing an extensive phylogenetic analysis for the Coelurosauria. In the case of ornithomimosaurs, the Garudimimidae was recovered as a family containing Garudimimus and close relatives. Garudimimus was recovered in a rather derived position as the sister taxon of Beishanlong. This analysis found close relationship between Deinocheirus and Garudimimus to be unlikely, with the former recovered at the near base of Ornithomimosauria.

Left cladogram per Lee and colleagues in 2014, right cladogram per Hartman and colleagues in 2019:

- Deinocheiridae
  - Beishanlong
  - - Garudimimus
    - Deinocheirus

- Garudimimidae
  - Arkansaurus
  - - Archaeornithomimus
    - - "Grusimimus" GIN 960910KD
      - - Beishanlong
        - Garudimimus

In 2020, Serrano-Brañas and team described and named the new deinocheirid genus Paraxenisaurus from the Cerro del Pueblo Formation. This is the first member of the group to be found outside Asia and its discovery could indicate that deinocheirids originated in Laurasia (northern supercontinent during the Mesozoic) or that they dispersed across polar regions in the Northern Hemisphere; a similar interchange is also known to have occurred in other dinosaur groups with Asian affinities during the Campanian-Maastrichtian ages. The team found Harpymimus to be a rather primitive deinocheirid, however, Beishanlong was placed outside the group. Garudimimus and Deinocheirus were recovered again as closely related taxa with the addition of Paraxenisaurus in a polytomy.

== Paleobiology ==
=== Daily activity ===
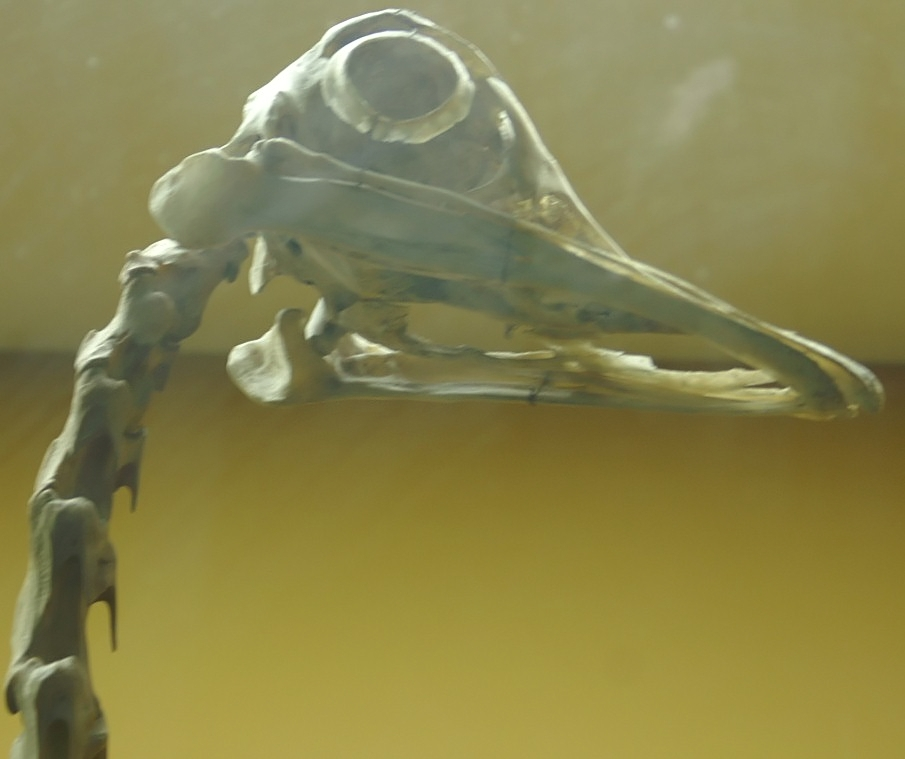
Skull of the common ostrich featuring a large scleral ring. Schmitz and Motani used this bony structure to predict daily activity patterns in extinct dinosaur and pterosaur species

Limb proportions, pedal unguals morphology and the extension of the ilium of Garudimimus suggest that it was not adapted for speed as in the more cursorial ornithomimids, which are characterized by powerful thighs and straight unguals. In 2011, Lars Schmitz and Ryosuke Motani measured the dimensions of the scleral ring and eye socket in fossil specimens of dinosaurs and pterosaurs, as well as some living species. They noted that whereas diurnal (photopic) animals have smaller scleral rings, nocturnal (scotopic) animals tend to have more enlarged rings. Cathemeral (mesopic) animals—which are irregularly active throughout the day and night—are between these two ranges. Schmitz and Motani separated ecological and phylogenetic factors and by examining 164 living species, they noticed that eye measurements are quite accurate when inferring diurnality, cathemerality, or nocturnality in tetrapods. The results indicated that Garudimimus was a cathemeral herbivore with other predatory theropods being mainly nocturnal. Large herbivorous dinosaurs were found to have been cathemeral most likely because of the extended amounts of time during foraging and thermoregulation factors. Birds and pterosaurs were mostly diurnal with some nocturnal exceptions. They concluded that the ecological niche was a main driver in the development of diel activity.

However, this analysis was criticized in the same year by Hall and colleagues arguing against the methods employed by Schmitz and Motani in that there is a considerable degree of similarities on scleral anatomy between diurnal, cathemeral and nocturnal animals. Moreover, soft tissues like the cornea are essential in figuring out how much light can enter the eye, which is clearly absent in fossil specimens. Schmitz and Motani made a response to this comment affirming their research and methodology properly categorized extinct dinosaur behaviors based on extant species. They cited the exterior border of the scleral ring as a reliable source when reconstructing visual capabilities.

=== Senses ===
In 2019, Graham M. Hughes and John A. Finarelli analyzed the olfactory bulb ratio in modern birds and preserved skulls of several extinct dinosaur species to predict how many genes would have been involved in the olfactory strength of these extinct species. Their analysis found that most ornithomimosaurs had relatively weak senses of smell; Garudimimus had roughly 417 genes encoding its olfactory receptors and an olfactory bulb ratio of 28.8, indicating a poorly developed sense of smell. Given that these values were more pronounced in larger dinosaur species, such as tyrannosaurids, Hughes and Finarelli pointed out that as dinosaurian lineages became larger, the size of the olfactory bulb also increased, which may suggest olfaction as the dominant sensory modality in non-avian dinosaurs.

=== Feeding habits ===
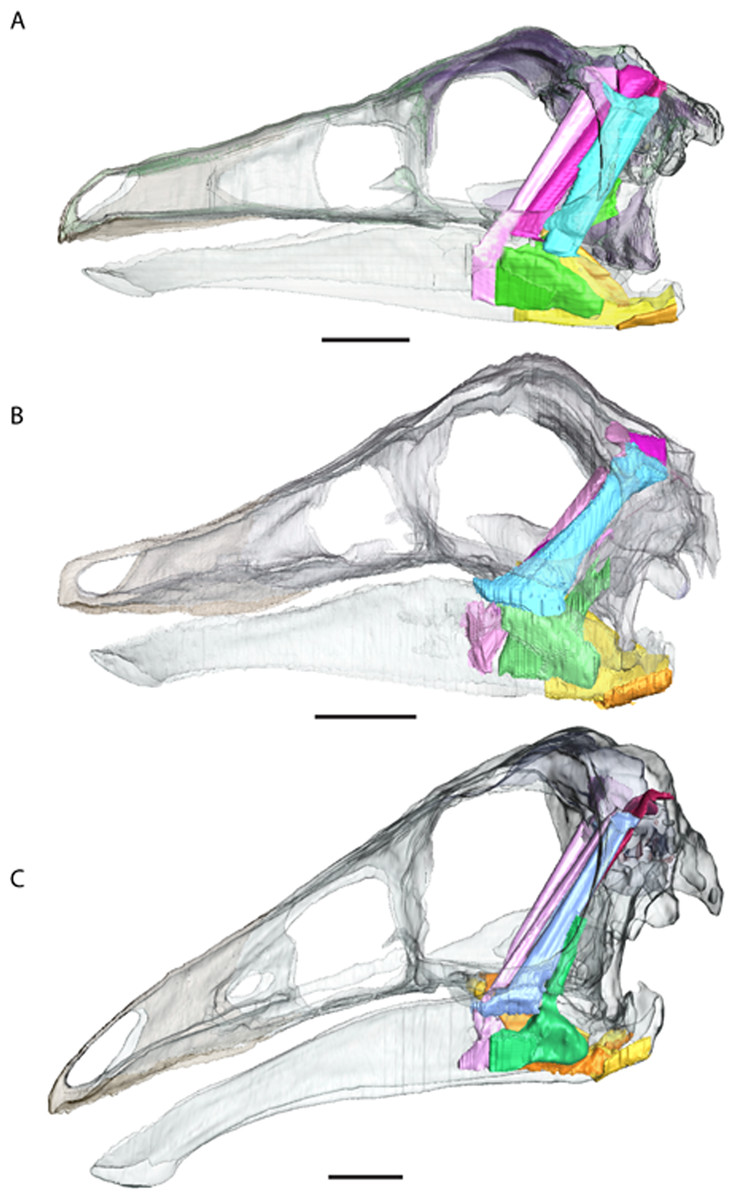
Reconstructed jaw musculature of Garudimimus (top), Struthiomimus (center) and Ornithomimus (bottom)

Kobayashi and Barsbold stated in 2005 that the absence of dentition on the lower jaw and the recurved shape of the same indicates that Garudimimus was fairly more similar to ornithomimids when consuming food than to other primitive ornithomimosaurs. Like ornithomimids, the anterior parts of the upper and lower jaws of Garudimimus were both covered by a beak and may have been used for plucking food. In addition, the sharp edges on the middle portions of the jaws helped for cutting food. Moreover, Garudimimus and kin are widely regarded as herbivore or at least omnivore dinosaurs by their peculiar anatomical traits—including the presence of a beak.

In 2015, Andrew R. Cuff and Emily J. Rayfield performed CT scans on taphonomically distorted specimen skulls of Garudimimus, Ornithomimus and Struthiomimus in order to be retrodeformed—a method used to produce the original state of a deformed object. The scans and relatively completeness of the specimens allowed the reconstruction of the adductor (motion-inducing) musculature of the lower jaw, which was then mapped onto the skulls. Additionally, the extent of the rhamphotheca (beak) was reconstructed into small—based on a ratite bird, the ostrich—and large morphs. Among the three genera studied, Garudimimus had the most reduced bite force, found to produce 19 N at the tip of the beak and 23.9 N at the mid-length of the same. However, this taxon had the most modified muscle mechanical advantage and moment arm—a measure of the effectiveness of a muscle at contributing to a particular motion over a range of configurations. With this consideration, the most significant muscular difference between Garudimimus and the two ornithomimids was found in that most muscles are more mechanically advantageous in the latter two; this is likely caused due to the longer skull in Garudimimus. Cuff and Rayfield pointed out that the bite force of Garudimimus may be limited for having to use the mandible of Struthiomimus in the reconstructions or that MPC-D 100/13 is a sub-adult individual. Tentatively, they agreed in that relatively low bite forces combined with a rhamphotheca could be used to hold plant material during feeding in ornithomimosaurs, all of this whilst neck musculature provided enough force to pluck away vegetation.

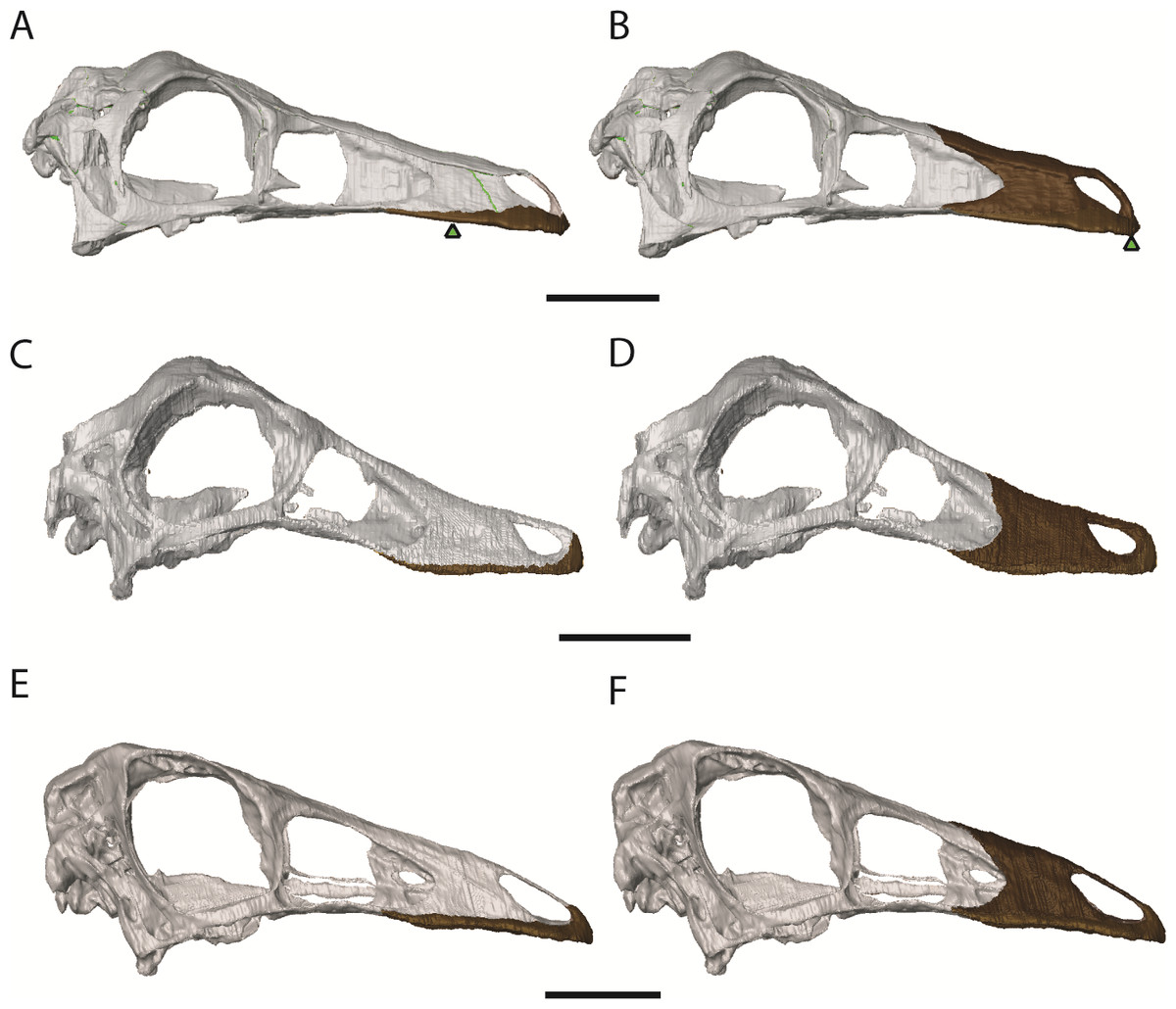
Reconstructed rhamphotheca of Garudimimus (top) compared to the derived Struthiomimus (center) and Ornithomimus (bottom)

In 2019, David J. Button and Lindsay E. Zanno performed a large phylogenetic analysis based on skull biomechanical characters—provided by 160 Mesozoic dinosaur species—to analyze the multiple emergences of herbivory among non-avian dinosaurs. Their results found that herbivorous dinosaurs mainly followed two distinct modes of feeding, either processing food in the gut—characterized by relatively gracile skulls and low bite forces—or the mouth, which was characterized by features associated with extensive processing such as high bite forces and robust jaw musculature. Garudimimus and Deinocheirus, along with caenagnathid, diplodocoid, ornithomimid, therizinosaurid and titanosaur dinosaurs, were found to be in the former category, indicating that Garudimimus had indeed low bite forces and relied mostly on its stomach to process food. Large body sizes were achieved independently in deinocheirids and ornithomimids, and larger sizes offer advantages to herbivore animals, such as increased resistance to fasting and more ingestion. Hence, these habits may indicate a more herbivorous life-style in deinocheirids and ornithomimids. However, Button and Zanno pointed out that the relationship between herbivory and size is not always related and there is no lineal trend of increasing mass in ornithomimosaurs. Furthermore, specific niches were poorly exploited for most ornithomimosaurian dinosaurs with only Deinocheirus showing an opportunistic omnivory. Button and Zanno concluded that feeding strategies convergently evolved in unrelated herbivorous dinosaurs over the time.

During the same year, Ali Nabavizadeh studied the jaw musculature in herbivorous dinosaurs and concluded that some were primarily orthal feeders—moving their jaws up and down—including theropods, sauropodomorphs, primitive ornithischians, and some stegosaurs. Nabavizadeh noted that ornithomimosaurs were orthal feeders and raised their jaws isognathously whereby the upper and lower teeth of each side occluded (contacted each other) at once. Deinocheirus and Garudimimus have unique attachment sites for the muscles that open and close the jaws, which are composed by a downwards-expanded, triangular adductor musculature complex attaching to a forwards expanding surangular bone. This, working together with a flared jugal flange, allows more cavity for the adductor muscle. With such elongate snout, the bite forces of both deinocheirids were low with reduced mechanical advantage, however, if this muscle extended farther forwards then this would have added strength to the temporal muscle.

== Paleoenvironment ==
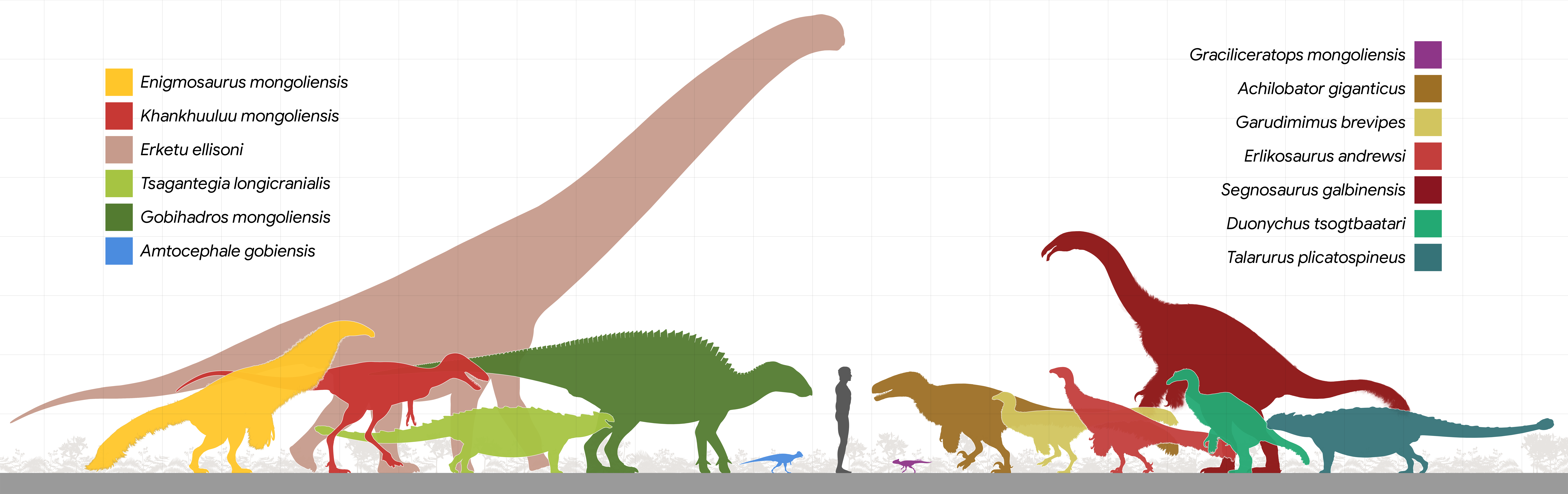
Garudimimus compared to the named dinosaurian fauna of the Bayan Shireh Formation (Garudimimus in light yellow, third from the right)

The known remains of Garudimimus were unearthed from the Late Cretaceous Bayan Shireh Formation at the Bayshin Tsav locality. This formation is mainly composed by claystones and sandstones with concretions and characterized by mudstones and yellowish-brown medium grained sandstones. The presence of caliche, fluvial and lacustrine sedimentation at various localities indicates that this formation was deposited by meandering rivers and other large water bodies on an alluvial plain (flat land consisting of sediments deposited by highland rivers) under a semi-arid climate. Bayshin Tsav itself, is interpreted to have been deposited under fluvial environments. Using calcite U–Pb measurements, the age of the Bayan Shireh Formation has been dated from about 95.9 ± 6.0 million to 89.6 ± 4.0 million years ago during the Cenomanian-Santonian stages.

Numerous scale-like cross-stratifications at the Baynshire locality are indicators of large meanders, and the vast majority of these water bodies may have drained the eastern part of the Gobi Desert. These humid environments are further supported by the discovery of aquatic reptiles like turtles and crocodylomorphs, and ostracods. Based on the similar fossil assemblages, a correlation between the Bayan Shireh and Iren Dabasu formations has been proposed by numerous authors. Furthermore, the Iren Dabasu Formation has been dated about 95.8 ± 6.2 million years ago.

Garudimimus shared its habitat with multiple dinosaurian fauna, such as the herbivorous ornithischians Gobihadros, Graciliceratops and Talarurus. Other theropods are represented by the tyrannosauroid Khankhuuluu, the large dromaeosaurid Achillobator, and the therizinosaurids Erlikosaurus and Segnosaurus. Erketu may have been the tallest herbivore within the fauna. Several species were separated by niche differentiation, such as Erlikosaurus and the large Segnosaurus, or the grazer Talarurus and browser Tsagantegia, another ankylosaurid from the formation. In terms of biodiversity, therizinosaurs were some of the most abundant theropods with multiple described and undescribed specimens across the formation. However, hadrosauroid remains—particularly at Baynshire—are also abundant and well-reported. Though Garudimimus is currently the only ornithomimosaur taxon named, the Bayan Shireh Formation has produced locally abundant ornithomimosaurs at Bayshin Tsav.

== See also ==
- Timeline of ornithomimosaur research
