= Cretaceous Mongolia =

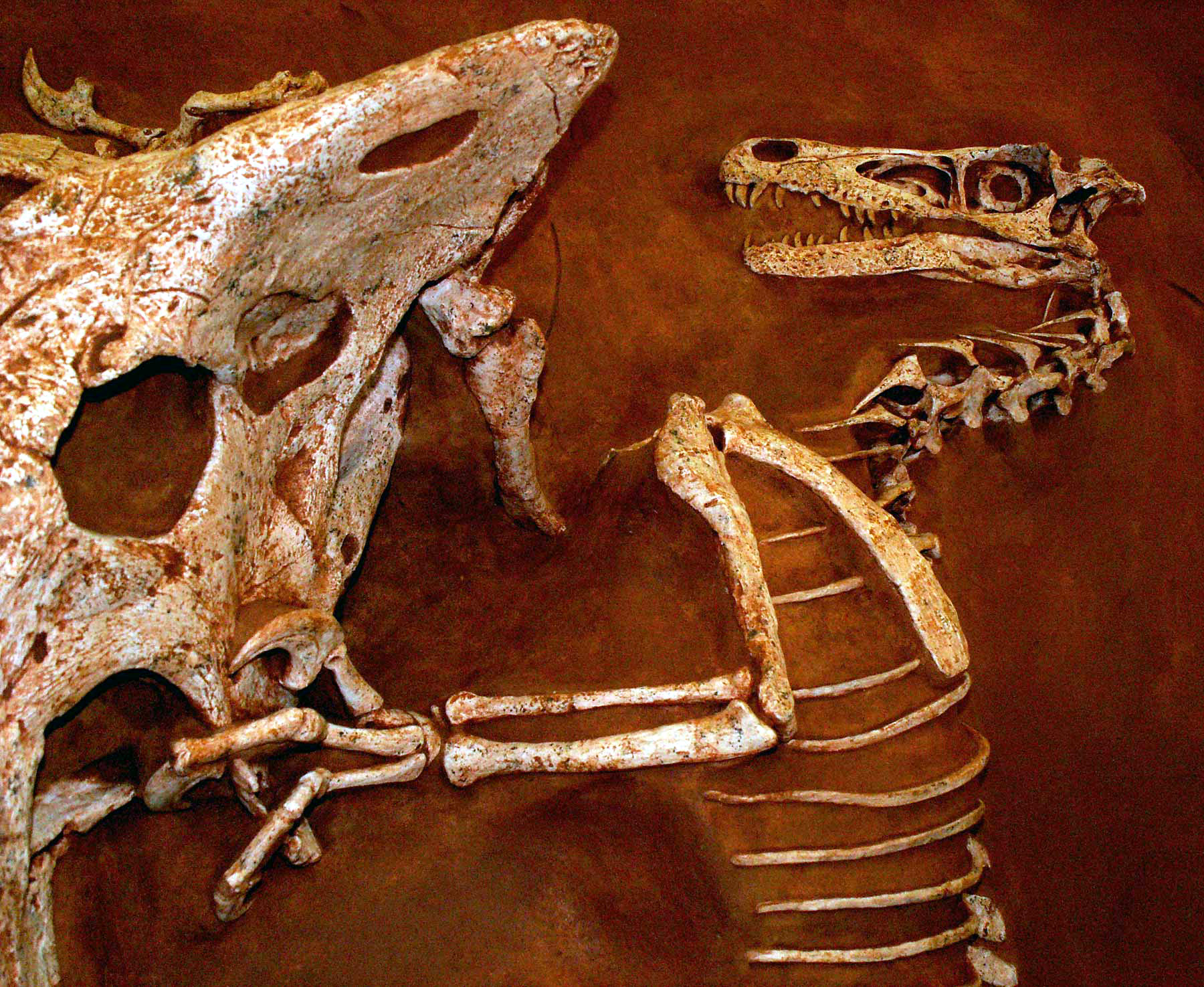
Velociraptor and Protoceratops - Fighting dinosaurs

Cretaceous Mongolia is one of the best preserved of all Mesozoic ecosystems. The shifting sand of what was, even then, the Gobi Desert have ensured that fossils of the animals that lived there can be found in exactly the position in which they were buried, with most of the bones together. The most notable fossil, dubbed the Fighting Dinosaurs, is the very well preserved remains of a Velociraptor, locked in combat with a Protoceratops, a small ceratopsian.

== Dinosaurs in Mt. Altai ==
Mt. Altai is unusual because the comparative lack of food means that most of the dinosaurs there remained quite small, most not much bigger than a present-day person.

There were a few large dinosaurs, though. Tarbosaurus was the Mongolian equivalent of Tyrannosaurus rex and was almost as large. The large herbivores grew into many strange shapes. Therizinosaurus was a bipedal herbivore about as tall as Tarbosaurus with a long neck, small head and characteristic long claws on the hands which it used for defence and to help it browse far away trees. Small ankylosaurs were the armour-plated residents and hadrosaurs provided large prey for the carnivores.

Unusual prehistoric animals, such as the Oviraptor, fed on many of the same things that Velociraptor did. The two species often competed for food.

The Gobi Desert was often interspersed with scrubland and occasionally a dense rainforest supporting many types of plant life, insects, and small dinosaurs like Shuvuuia and Mononykus. Mononykus, Shuvuuia and the Velociraptor were among the dinosaurs that are taxon related to modern birds.
