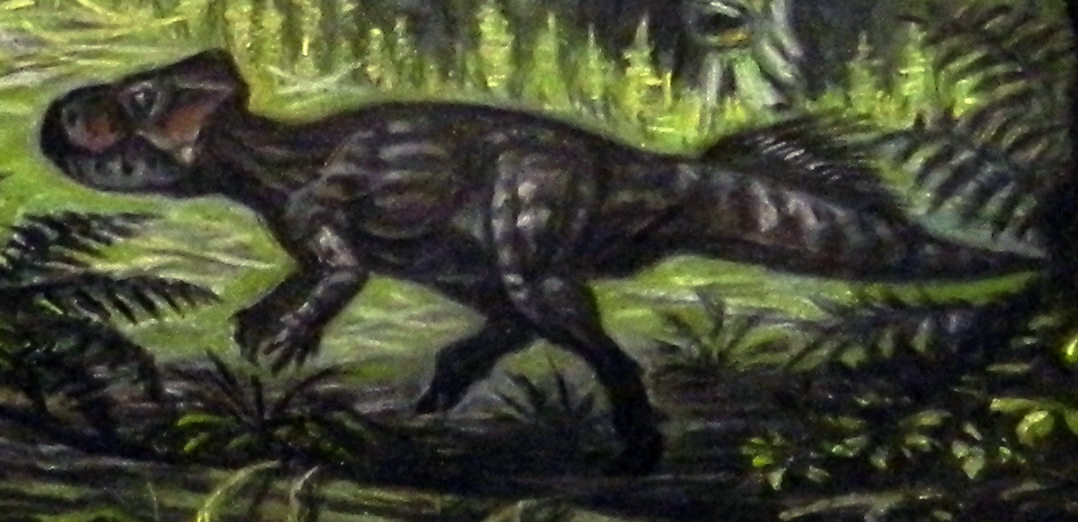
- Life restoration

Scientific classification
- Kingdom: Animalia
- Phylum: Chordata
- Class: Reptilia
- Clade: Dinosauria
- Clade: †Ornithischia
- Clade: †Ceratopsia
- Clade: †Neoceratopsia
- Genus: †Microceratus; Mateus, 2008

Type species
- †Microceratops gobiensis Bohlin, 1953

Other species
- †M. sulcidens? Bohlin, 1953

= Microceratus =

Microceratus Temporal range: Late Cretaceous, 90 Ma

Extinct genus of dinosaurs

Microceratus (meaning "small-horned") is a genus of small ceratopsian dinosaur that lived in the Cretaceous period of Mongolia. It walked on two legs, had short front arms, a characteristic ceratopsian frill and beak-like mouth, and was around 60 cm (2.0 ft) long. It was one of the most primitive ceratopsians, or horned dinosaurs, along with Psittacosaurus, which was also discovered in Mongolia.

== Discovery ==
The type species, Microceratops gobiensis, was first described by Bohlin in 1953, and so was the second species, M. sulcidens, which may belong to Asiaceratops instead. However, the generic name was already preoccupied by an ichneumon wasp (subfamily Cryptinae) with the same name. Though much of the material has since been reassigned to the genus Graciliceratops, a replacement name Microceratus was created by Mateus in 2008 for the type specimen.

== Classification ==
Microceratus belonged to the Ceratopsia (Ancient Greek for "horned face"), a group of herbivorous dinosaurs with parrot-like beaks which thrived in North America and Asia during the Cretaceous Period, which ended roughly 66 million years ago. All ceratopsians became extinct at the end of this era.

== Diet ==
Microceratus, like all ceratopsians, was a herbivore. During the Cretaceous, flowering plants were "geographically limited on the landscape", and so it is likely that this dinosaur fed on the predominant plants of the era: ferns, cycads and conifers. It would have used its sharp ceratopsian beak to bite off the leaves or needles.

== See also ==
- Timeline of ceratopsian research
- Leptoceratops
- Graciliceratops
