= Kayrasaurus =

Kayrasaurus Temporal range: Early Cretaceous, Barremian–Aptian

Scientific classification
- Kingdom: Animalia
- Phylum: Chordata
- Class: Reptilia
- Clade: Dinosauria
- Clade: Saurischia
- Clade: Theropoda
- Clade: Maniraptora
- Clade: †Therizinosauria
- Genus: †Kayrasaurus; Liao et al., 2026
- Species: †K. changliensis

Binomial name
- †Kayrasaurus changliensis Liao et al., 2026

Genus of theropod dinosaur

Kayrasaurus (lit. 'Kayra lizard') is an extinct genus of therizinosaurian theropod dinosaur known from the Early Cretaceous (Barremian–Aptian ages) Yixian Formation of China. The genus contains a single species, Kayrasaurus changliensis, named in 2026 based on a nearly complete skeleton including the skull. This specimen is largely articulated, but very flattened into nearly two dimensions. The legs and most of the pelvis are unknown. With a length of 3.6 metres (12 ft) and an estimated weight of 117–274 kilograms (258–604 lb), Kayrasaurus is the largest therizinosaur known from the Jehol Biota. Like other therizinosaurs, the front of its jaws were toothless. It is unique in the small, closely packed teeth in the rest of the upper and lower jaws, bearing more teeth in the mandible than any other therizinosaur. The vertebrae in the neck are notably elongated, and the claws on the hand are large and strongly curved. Kayrasaurus is closely related to the contemporary Beipiaosaurus and Jianchangosaurus, both of which are also known from the Yixian Formation.

== Discovery and naming ==
The Kayrasaurus type locality is in Beipiao, China

The Kayrasaurus fossil material was discovered in outcrops of the Yixian Formation in Dabangou village near Beipiao in Liaoning Province, China. The specimen is housed at the Institute of Vertebrate Paleontology & Paleoanthropology (IVPP) in Beijing, where it was prepared by Ding Xiaoqing. It is permanently accessioned there as specimen IVPP V 18957, and consists of a nearly complete skeleton including the skull. Much of the skeleton, including the skull and vertebral column, is articulated, albeit compressed via taphonomic deformation. Some of the metacarpals and carpals of the forelimbs, the entirety of both hindlimbs, much of the pelvis, and the tip of the tail are missing.

In 2026, Liao Chun-Chi and colleagues described Kayrasaurus changliensis as a new genus and species of therizinosaurian dinosaur based on these fossil remains, designating IVPP V 18957 as the holotype specimen. The generic name, Kayrasaurus, combines a reference to Kayra, the creation god in Turkic shamanism, with the Ancient Greek σαῦρος (saûros), meaning 'lizard'. Kayra is regarded as the father of Erlik, the god of death, for whom the fellow therizinosaur Erlikosaurus was named. The specific name, changliensis, derives from Changli, a historical Three Kingdoms-era name for the region that includes the type locality.

== Description ==
Life reconstruction

=== Size and age ===
Kayrasaurus is regarded as a medium-sized therizinosaur, with a body length of at least 3.6 metres (12 ft). Dinosaur body mass is often calculated using the circumference of the midshaft of the femur, though this bone is missing in the only known specimen of Kayrasaurus. As such, referencing related therizinosaurs that do have a femur, the body mass of Kayrasaurus can be estimated at 117–274 kilograms (258–604 lb). These measurements make it substantially larger than Beipiaosaurus, the next largest therizinosaur known from the Jehol Biota, which has an estimated body length of 2.2 m (7.2 ft). Despite being the largest therizinosaur in the Biota, it was likely not fully grown at the time it died. A subadult stage is suggested by the open sutures between the neural arches and centra of the cervical (neck), dorsal (trunk), and first few caudal (tail) vertebrae (these sutures are closed in skeletally mature individuals), as well as incomplete fusion between paired bones along the skull's midline (these bones fuse with maturity).

=== Skull ===
The skull of the holotype is severely flattened due to taphonomic factors; CT scans of the skull reveal it to be only 3–5 mm (0.12–0.20 in) thick. The orbit is large and round. The external nares ('nose holes' in the skull) are also large, but elongated from front to back. The premaxilla and maxilla (bones of the upper jaw) bear small foramina along their lengths. The premaxilla is entirely edentulous (toothless, as in all therizinosauroids), while only the first ~28% of the maxilla lacks teeth. There are about 32 alveoli (tooth positions) in the maxilla, which are very small, shallow, and closely packed, with 3.5 to 4 alveoli per centimetre. One tooth is preserved in each maxilla, exhibiting the lanceolate (leaf-like) shape familiar for therizinosaurs. The dentary (lower jaw bone) has a downturned symphysis, as in all therizinosaurs except Falcarius. The first 5 mm (0.20 in) of the dentary are toothless, followed by at least 45 small, packed alveoli. This indicates a higher mandibular tooth count than any other therizinosaur, as the next closest taxa—Beipiaosaurus, Alxasaurus, and Eshanosaurus—all have fewer than 40. All of these teeth in Kayrasaurus are restricted to the first two-thirds of the dentary, as in many therizinosaurs but distinct from Erlikosaurus, in which the teeth extend further. Most of the teeth of Kayrasaurus would have been similar in size (homodonty), though the alveolar sizes suggest those closest to the front were larger. These teeth, which were oriented slightly posteriorly (toward the rear), were also lanceolate in shape, with constricted necks and simple denticles.

The nasal bone, placed on the surface of the snout, extends further toward the back of the skull than in other therizinosaurs, meeting the frontal bone at about the midpoint of the orbit. In other therizinosaurs known from articulated skulls (i.e., Erlikosaurus and Jianchangosaurus), these bones meet in front of the orbit. The anterior (front) end of the nasal that meets the premaxilla is two-pronged, another autapomorphy (unique derived feature) of Kayrasaurus. Another distinguishing feature of this taxon is the shape of the external mandibular fenestra, an opening at the back of the lower jaw. In other therizinosaurs, it is narrow or slit-like, while in Kayrasaurus it is pointed toward the front but deeper toward the back, giving it a sub-triangular outline.

=== Vertebrae and ribs ===
Ten cervical (neck) vertebrae of the holotype are preserved in natural articulation, the same number as in the closely related Jianchangosaurus. Later-diverging therizinosaurs exhibit an increase in cervical vertebrae, up to 14 in Neimongosaurus. The neural spines are low with rounded upper edges. Foramina are present on the lateral surfaces of the centra, indicating these vertebrae were pneumatised (full of air pockets). These vertebrae are all substantially elongated, with the shortest one still being longer than the longest dorsal (trunk vertebra), a possible autapomorphy of Kayrasaurus. The cervical ribs are long and slender, about as long as the corresponding vertebrae to which they are partially fused.

Ten dorsal vertebrae are preserved, generally in articulation with the cervical and sacral vertebrae. A gap is present between the third/fourth and eighth/ninth vertebrae. An isolated dorsal vertebra preserved in association likely filled one of these regions, indicating at least eleven vertebrae in this series. Twelve were likely present in life, as in Jianchangosaurus. No evidence for pneumaticity is present. The closely related Beipiaosaurus has a series of four fused dorsal vertebrae, a feature not seen in Kayrasaurus. Complex laminae (ridges) and fossae (depressions) cover the neural arches, as in other therizinosaurs. The neural spines are generally tall and narrow; those toward the front are rounded and inclined posterodorsally (up and toward the back), while those toward the rear become more rectangular and are anteroposteriorly broader. The dorsal ribs are incomplete distally (away from the body), and are notably more robust than those of Beipiaosaurus.

The sacrum is composed of five fused vertebrae, with their neural spines all indistinguishable from each other, as in other therizinosaurs like Enigmosaurus and Nothronychus graffami. The centrum of the fourth sacral vertebra is not fully fused to the preceding vertebrae, implying neural spines fuse together earlier in ontogeny than centra do.

A nearly complete, articulated series of 32 caudal vertebrae is preserved following the sacrum. The distalmost end is missing, so it is unknown if it had the pygostyle-like structure seen in Beipiaosaurus. More derived therizinosaurs have been inferred to have fewer than 30 caudal vertebrae, suggesting that a decrease in the count of these vertebrae is a trend in therizinosaur evolution. Pneumaticity is not present. The first eight caudals are similar in length, after which the centra begin to become more elongate. The neural spines are sub-rectangular and slightly convex. Some chevrons are preserved in the holotype. Those toward the front and middle are longer than the corresponding centrum, while those toward the back become slightly shorter than the centrum.

=== Pectoral girdle and forelimbs ===
The pectoral girdle, comprising the scapula and coracoid, is partially fused. This is more similar to most derived therizinosaurs, as these bones are unfused in more basal taxa (e.g., Falcarius, Jianchangosaurus, Beipiaosaurus, and Martharaptor). The glenoid fossa (shoulder joint) faces posteroventrally (back and downward), a feature more similar to basal therizinosaurs than the laterally (outward)-facing glenoid of derived taxa. The coracoid is sub-rectangular, and the scapula has a long, slender blade that expands toward the distal tip. In more derived therizinosaurs, the scapular blade narrows toward the tip. The furcula (wishbone) is complete, with a gracile, V-shape typical of therizinosaurs. The angle between the two ends is broad (~140°), contrasting with the acute angle seen in Falcarius.

The forelimbs of Kayrasaurus are mostly complete, including both humeri, ulnae, and radii. The humerus is unusually robust, most similar to Erliansaurus and Nothronychus graffami. The shaft of the humerus is straight, unlike the bowed shaft in Falcarius. Conversely, the bowed ulna of Kayrasaurus is more similar to Falcarius and other maniraptorans than any other therizinosaur, including basal taxa, where the ulna is straight. The radius is straight and slender, as in basal therizinosaurs, in contrast to the bowed, robust radii of derived taxa.

A single carpal, possibly the intermedium, is preserved. It is small, flattened, and quadrilateral, with concavities on both sides and a prominent angular corner. The only preserved component of the metacarpus is the proximal end of the fourth metacarpal, which is similar in form to Falcarius and Beipiaosaurus. The phalanges (including the unguals, or claws) are generally well preserved, with a morphology comparable to Beipiaosaurus. The unguals are deeply curved, with their distalmost tips still intact. They are similar in length to the penultimate phalanges, similar to basal therizinosaurs but contrasting with the characteristically elongate unguals of the more derived Therizinosaurus and Nothronychus. Of the three digits (fingers; labeled II–IV), II is the shortest, although the first phalanx of this digit is the longest and most robust of any preserved phalanx. The proximal articular end of this phalanx is wider than it is high, contrasting with all other therizinosaurs, in which the opposite is true. The claw on digit II has the strongest curve. It is smaller than the claw on digit III, a condition otherwise only seen in Beipiaosaurus that was previously thought to be unique to that taxon. The flexor tubercle is especially robust on this claw. Digit III is the longest, and the claw has a less well-developed flexor tubercle than that on digit II. Digit IV is the most gracile manual digit. The first two phalanges are very short, their combined length comparable to that of the third phalanx. The claw on this digit is smaller than the other two. A prominent lip (also seen on ungual III-3) is present, although it is oriented proximodorsally, contrasting with the more posterior orientation in all other therizinosaurs.

=== Pelvis ===
Nearly all of the pelvic girdle is missing, although parts of both ilia are preserved. The left ilium is very damaged, with only the articular parts for the other (unpreserved) pelvic bones remaining. The right ilium is nearly complete, missing only a small portion of the front region. As in basal therizinosaurs, basal avialans, and dromaeosaurids, the iliac blade has a sub-parallelogram shape when seen from the side. This differs from the condition in derived therizinosaurs, where the iliac blade resembles the condition in sauropod dinosaurs. The pubic peduncle (articular process for the pubis) is longer than the ischiadic peduncle (articular process for the ischium), consistent with other therizinosaurs but distinct from Falcarius, in which they are subequal. The length of the pubic peduncle is about twice its width, similar to Falcarius and Jianchangosaurus but distinct from Beipiaosaurus, in which the proportions are subequal, and more derived therizinosaurs, in which the proportion is inverted. The ischiadic peduncle is peg-like, as in basal therizinosaurs, as opposed to square-like or circular, as in more derived taxa.

== Classification ==
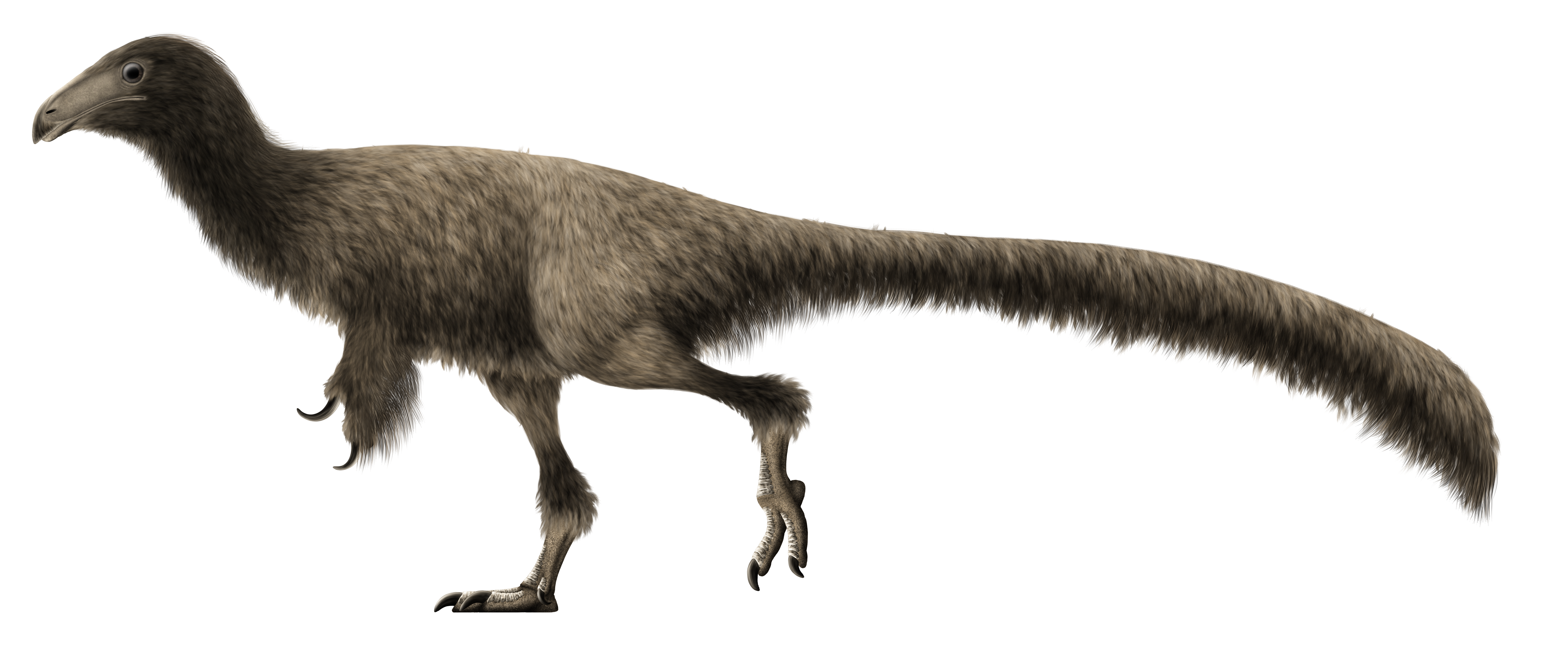
Life restoration of the more basal Jianchangosaurus

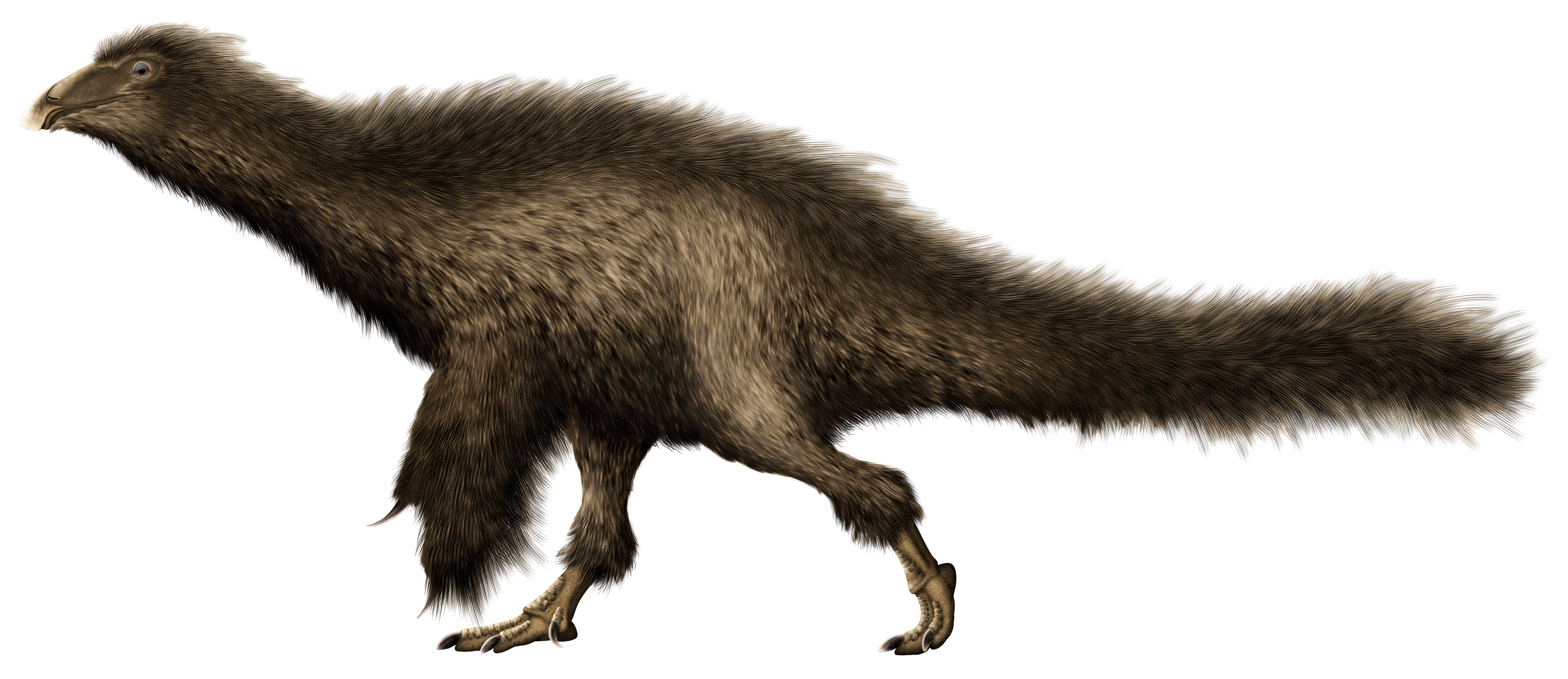
Life restoration of the more derived Beipiaosaurus

To test the affinities of Kayrasaurus, Liao et al. (2026) included it in a newly constructed phylogenetic matrix designed to analyze the evolution and relationships of therizinosaurs. This dataset synthesized characters and operational taxonomic units (OTUs) from the previous work by Zanno (2010), Senter et al. (2012), and Yao et al. (2019), with the addition of taxa and specimens described since these publications or otherwise not originally considered. Kayrasaurus was recovered as an early-diverging (basal) member of the Therizinosauria, as the sister taxon to the Therizinosauroidea (which comprises all more derived therizinosaurs). As such, it is phylogenetically intermediate between the more basal Jianchangosaurus and the more derived Beipiaosaurus (the basalmost therizinosauroid), which are both known from the Yixian Formation. These results are displayed in the cladogram below:

- Therizinosauria
  - Fukuivenator paradoxus
  - - Falcarius utahensis
    - - Eshanosaurus deguchiianus
      - - Jianchangosaurus yixianensis
        - - Kayrasaurus changliensis
          - Therizinosauroidea
            - Beipiaosaurus inexpectus
            - - Lingyuanosaurus sihedangensis
              - - Alxasaurus elesitaiensis
                - Erliansaurus bellamanus
                - Martharaptor greenriverensis
                - Bissekty Fm. therizinosauroid
                - Nanchao Fm. therizinosauroid embryo
                - - Neimongosaurus yangi
                  - - Enigmosaurus mongoliensis
                    - - Suzhousaurus megatherioides
                      - Therizinosauridae
                        ⊞
                        - - Duonychus tsogtbaatari
                          - - Nothronychus mckinleyi
                            - Nothronychus graffami
                        - - - Erlikosaurus andrewsi
                          - Nanshiungosaurus brevispinus
                          - Paralitherizinosaurus japonicus
                          - Segnosaurus galbinensis
                          - Therizinosaurus cheloniformis
                        ⊟

== See also ==
- Timeline of therizinosaur research
- Paleobiota of the Yixian Formation
- 2026 in archosaur paleontology
