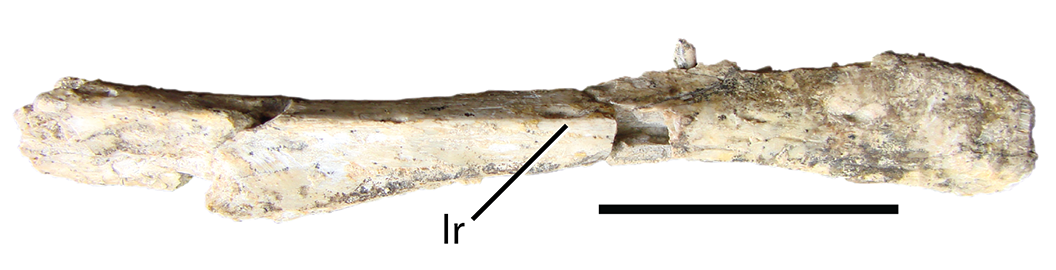
- Holotype mandible

Scientific classification
- Kingdom: Animalia
- Phylum: Chordata
- Class: Reptilia
- Clade: Dinosauria
- Clade: Saurischia
- Clade: Theropoda
- Clade: †Therizinosauria (?)
- Genus: †Eshanosaurus; Xu, Zhou & Clark, 2001

Type species
- Eshanosaurus deguchiianus Xu, Zhou & Clark, 2001

= Eshanosaurus =

Eshanosaurus Temporal range: Early Jurassic, 201.4–199.5 Ma

Extinct genus of dinosaurs

Eshanosaurus is a genus of a dinosaur from the early Jurassic Period. It is known only from a fossil partial lower jawbone, found in China. It may be a therizinosaurian, and if so the earliest known coelurosaur.

== Discovery and naming ==
The type species, Eshanosaurus deguchiianus, was described by Xu Xing, Xijin Zhao, and James M. Clark in 2001. The generic name is derived from Eshan. The specific name honours Hikaru Deguchi who convinced Xu that he should study dinosaurs. The type specimen, consisting of three fragments of a fossilized left lower jaw and teeth, was uncovered in the Dull Purplish Beds of the Lower Lufeng Formation in Yunnan, dating to Hettangian stage. The specimen is in the collection of the Institute of Vertebrate Paleontology and Paleoanthropology in Beijing, where it is catalogued under accession number IVPP V11579.

== Classification ==
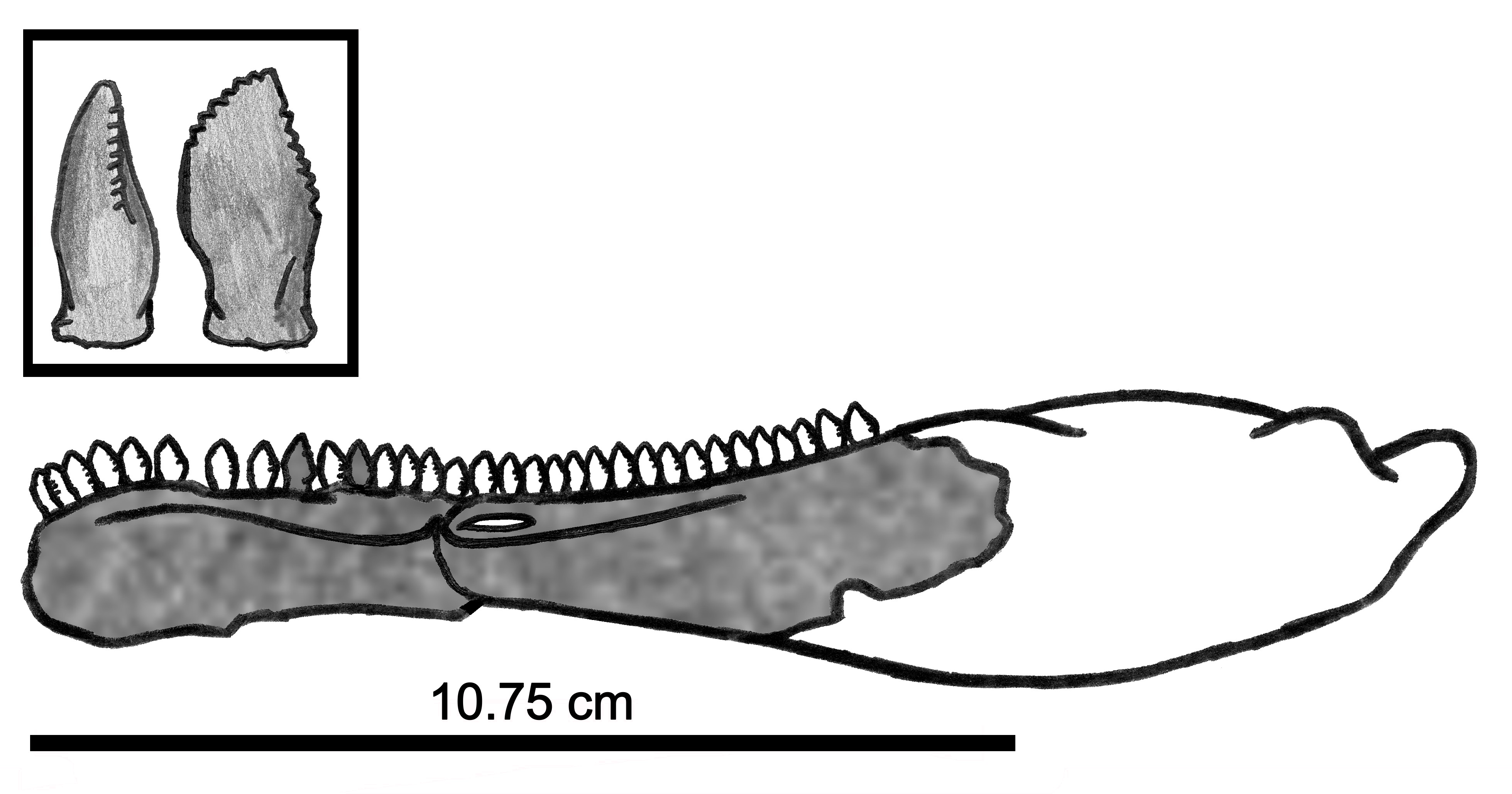
Diagram of the holotype

The authors who initially described the fossil, classified Eshanosaurus as a member of the Therizinosauroidea on the basis of six distinct characteristics of the jaw and teeth, making it the earliest known coelurosaur, a maniraptoran living long before Archaeopteryx, 60 million years before certain basal therizinosaurs such as Falcarius and Beipiaosaurus. A cladistic analysis was not performed and the authors "speculatively" suggested it was the most basal known therizinosauroid. Due to the unusually long chronological gap in the therizinosauroid and coelurosaurian fossil record or ghost lineage created by this interpretation of the find, a few scientists have expressed doubts about the classification of Eshanosaurus as a therizinosauroid. James Kirkland and D.G. Wolfe, in their 2001 paper describing the therizinosaur Nothronychus, related personal correspondence that the teeth of Eshanosaurus bore a medial ridge only seen in prosauropods or basal Sauropodomorpha. Xu, Zhao and Clark, however, had examined the possibility that Eshanosaurus was a prosauropod, given that it was found below numerous fossils of Lufengosaurus, a prosauropod of which the lower jaw closely resembles in general shape that of a therizinosaur. The authors arrived at their conclusion that the specimen represented an Early Jurassic therizinosauroid, by testing the possibility that it were a basal sauropodomorph as rigorously as they could using the comparative method: the six traits found were those shared between Eshanosaurus and therizinosaurs to the exclusion of prosauropods.

In 2009, a paper published by Paul M. Barrett again examined the question of Eshanosaurus classification. Barrett examined the type specimen in detail, noting six features shared with therizinosaurs but not shown by prosauropods. Barrett concluded by agreeing with the original interpretation, that Eshanosaurus is a therizinosaur, and that its presence in the early Jurassic has important implications for the evolutionary history of coelurosaurs, notably, that large portions of the coelurosaur fossil record remain missing. The describers of Martharaptor noted that all but three of the putative therizinosaurian characteristics of Eshanosaurus identified by Barrett (2009) are also known in sauropodomorphs. Sues and Averianov (2016) considered the putative therizinosaurian affinites of Eshanosaurus to be problematic.

== See also ==
- Timeline of therizinosaur research
