= Lindsay Zanno =

American paleontologist

Lindsay E. Zanno
- Born: c. 1980 (age c. 46)
- Education: University of New Mexico; University of Utah
- Scientific career
- Fields: Paleontology
- Workplaces: Natural History Museum of Utah; Field Museum of Natural History; North Carolina State University

Lindsay E. Zanno (born c. 1980) is an American vertebrate paleontologist and a leading expert on theropod dinosaurs and Cretaceous paleoecosystems. She is the Head of Paleontology at the North Carolina Museum of Natural Sciences and an Associate Research Professor in the Department of Biological Sciences at North Carolina State University.

== Education ==
Zanno received her B.Sc. in Biological Anthropology from the University of New Mexico in 1999, and her graduate degrees from the University of Utah in the department of Geology and Geophysics (M.Sc. in 2004, Ph.D. in 2008). Her M.Sc. thesis was titled "The pectoral girdle and forelimb of a primitive therizinosauroid (Theropoda, Maniraptora) with phylogenetic and functional implications," which addressed the anatomy of Falcarius utahensis. Her Ph.D. dissertation was titled "A taxonomic and phylogenetic reevaluation of Therizinosauria (Dinosauria: Theropoda): implications for the evolution of Maniraptora," which broadly addressed the relationships of therizinosaurs.

== Academic contributions ==
Zanno has contributed to more than 200 technical publications, and her work has been cited more than 2,000 times. She has published in leading international journals, including Nature, Nature Communications, Proceedings of the National Academy of Sciences, Science Advances, Current Biology, Proceedings of the Royal Society B: Biological Sciences, and Scientific Reports. Her primary focus is on the paleobiology of theropods from the Cretaceous of North America, but she has also published on ornithischian dinosaurs, crocodylomorphs, avians, aetosaur pseudosuchians, temnospondyls, and trace fossils. Zanno has contributed to naming many new species of dinosaurs, including the therizinosaur Falcarius, the troodontid Talos sampsoni, the hadrosaur Velafrons coahuilensis, the oviraptorosaur Hagryphus giganteus, the iguanodontian Choyrodon barsboldi, the allosauroid Siats meekerorum, and the tyrannosauroid Moros intrepidus. Her work is supported by numerous awards, primarily from the National Science Foundation, and has been extensively covered by major news outlets, including the Science Channel, History Channel, National Geographic, the New York Times, NPR and the BBC.

Zanno serves as the president of the Jurassic Foundation and co-chair of the program committee for the Society of Vertebrate Paleontology's annual meeting and previously served as Science Advocate for the Walking With Dinosaurs Arena Spectacular and on-air host for The Ice Age Exhibition.

Below is a list of taxa that Zanno has contributed to naming:

Year	Taxon	Authors
2026	Kayrasaurus changliensis gen. et sp. nov.	Liao, Freimuth, Zanno, & Xu
2025	Nanotyrannus lethaeus sp. nov.	Zanno & Napoli
2025	Zavacephale rinpoche gen. et sp. nov.	Chinzorig, Takasaki, Yoshida, Tucker, Buyantegsh, Mainbayar, Tsogtbaatar, & Zanno
2024	Fona herzogae gen. et sp. nov.	Avrahami, Makovicky, Tucker, & Zanno
2023	Iani smithi gen. et sp. nov.	Zanno, Gates, Avrahami, Tucker, & Makovicky
2019	Moros intrepidus gen. et sp. nov.	Zanno, Tucker, Canoville, Avrahami, Gates, & Makovicky
2018	Choyrodon barsboldi gen. et sp. nov.	Gates, Tsogtbaatar, Zanno, Chinzorig, & Watabe
2015	Carnufex carolinensis gen. et sp. nov.	Zanno, Drymala, Nesbitt, & Schneider
2013	Siats meekerorum gen. et sp. nov.	Zanno & Makovicky
2011	Talos sampsoni gen. et sp. nov.	Zanno, Varrichio, O'Connor, Titus, & Knell
2009	Nothronychus graffami sp. nov.	Zanno, Gillette, Albright, & Titus
2007	Velafrons coahuilensis gen. et sp. nov.	Gates, Sampson, Delgado De Jesús, Zanno, Eberth, Hernandez-Rivera, Aguillón Martínez, & Kirkland
2005	Hagryphus giganteus gen. et sp. nov.	Zanno & Sampson
2005	Falcarius utahensis gen. et sp. nov.	Kirkland, Zanno, Sampson, Clark, & DeBlieux

== Outreach and science communication ==
Zanno is active in community and science outreach, including on Twitter and through ExpeditionLive!, a platform developed to connect with the public during fieldwork. She has spearheaded several initiatives through the NC Museum of Natural Sciences, such as FossilPhiles, which invites students in grades 8–11 to work with museum paleontologists; Shark Teeth Forensics, which provides primary school students with the opportunity to conduct research using shark teeth; and Cretaceous Creatures, which will provide students with the opportunity to conduct research using microvertebrates. The last of these is part of the new Dueling Dinosaurs Program, an exhibit slated to open in 2023 that is centered around a remarkable specimen of a complete skeleton of Nanotyrannus side-by-side with a skeleton of Triceratops. The specimen of Nanotyrannus represents the only fully complete skeleton of this species that is known to date, and the specimens were donated to the museum by the affiliated Friends of the NC Museum of Natural Sciences, who purchased it for US$6 million from a private collector. The specimen had previously failed to sell at the seller's minimum price in 2013 and was subsequently the center of a lengthy legal battle over the ownership of the fossil.
