= Nanchao Formation =

Geologic formation in Henan, China

- Stratigraphic range: Santonian-Campanian; ~85–75 Ma
- Type: Geological formation

Location
- Coordinates: 32.5°N 112.4°E
- Approximate paleocoordinates: 30.8°N 102.4°E
- Region: Henan
- Country: China
- Extent: Nanyang Valley, Lingbao Basin
- Nanchao Formation (China) Nanchao Formation (Henan)

The Nanchao Formation is a Late Cretaceous geologic formation in China. Fossil ornithopod tracks have been reported from the formation. Embryos of therizinosaurs are known from the formation

== See also ==
- List of dinosaur-bearing rock formations
  - List of stratigraphic units with ornithischian tracks
    - Ornithopod tracks
