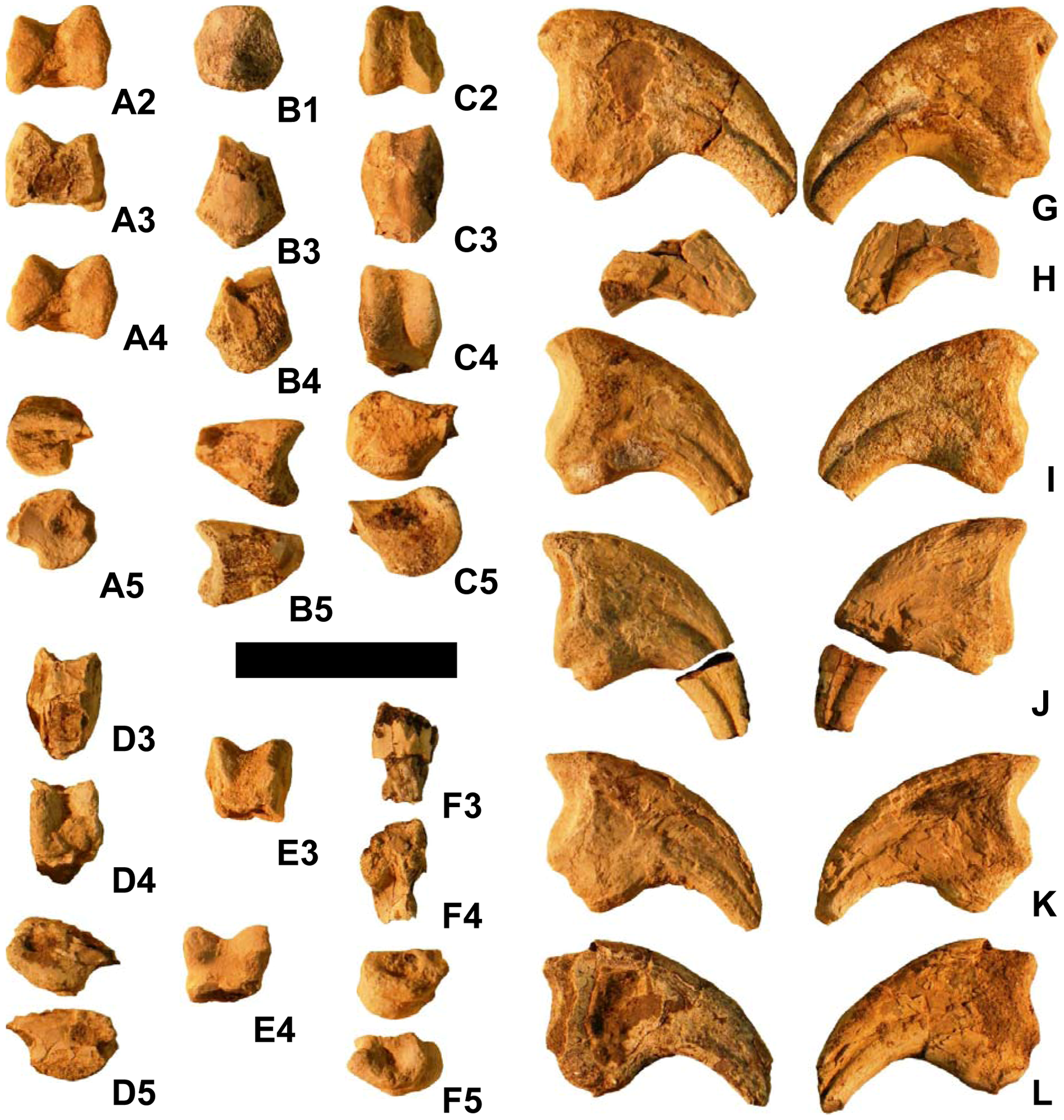
- Finger bones (A-F) and hand claws (G-L)

Scientific classification
- Kingdom: Animalia
- Phylum: Chordata
- Class: Reptilia
- Clade: Dinosauria
- Clade: Saurischia
- Clade: Theropoda
- Clade: †Therizinosauria
- Superfamily: †Therizinosauroidea
- Genus: †Martharaptor; Senter et al., 2012

Type species
- †Martharaptor greenriverensis Senter et al., 2012

= Martharaptor =

Martharaptor Temporal range: Early Cretaceous, ~139–134.6 Ma

Extinct genus of dinosaurs

Martharaptor is a genus of therizinosauroid theropod dinosaurs from the Early Cretaceous of the Cedar Mountain Formation in Utah. They can be distinguished from other therizinosauroids by means of several features of the skeleton (particularly the hands and feet) which were intermediate between early therizinosaurs such as Falcarius and Beipiaosaurus, and more "advanced" members of the group like therizinosaurids. The deep and homogeneous hand claws clearly differ from the case in early therizinosauroids, but the foot has not yet acquired the robust morphology of therizinosaurids.

== Discovery and naming ==
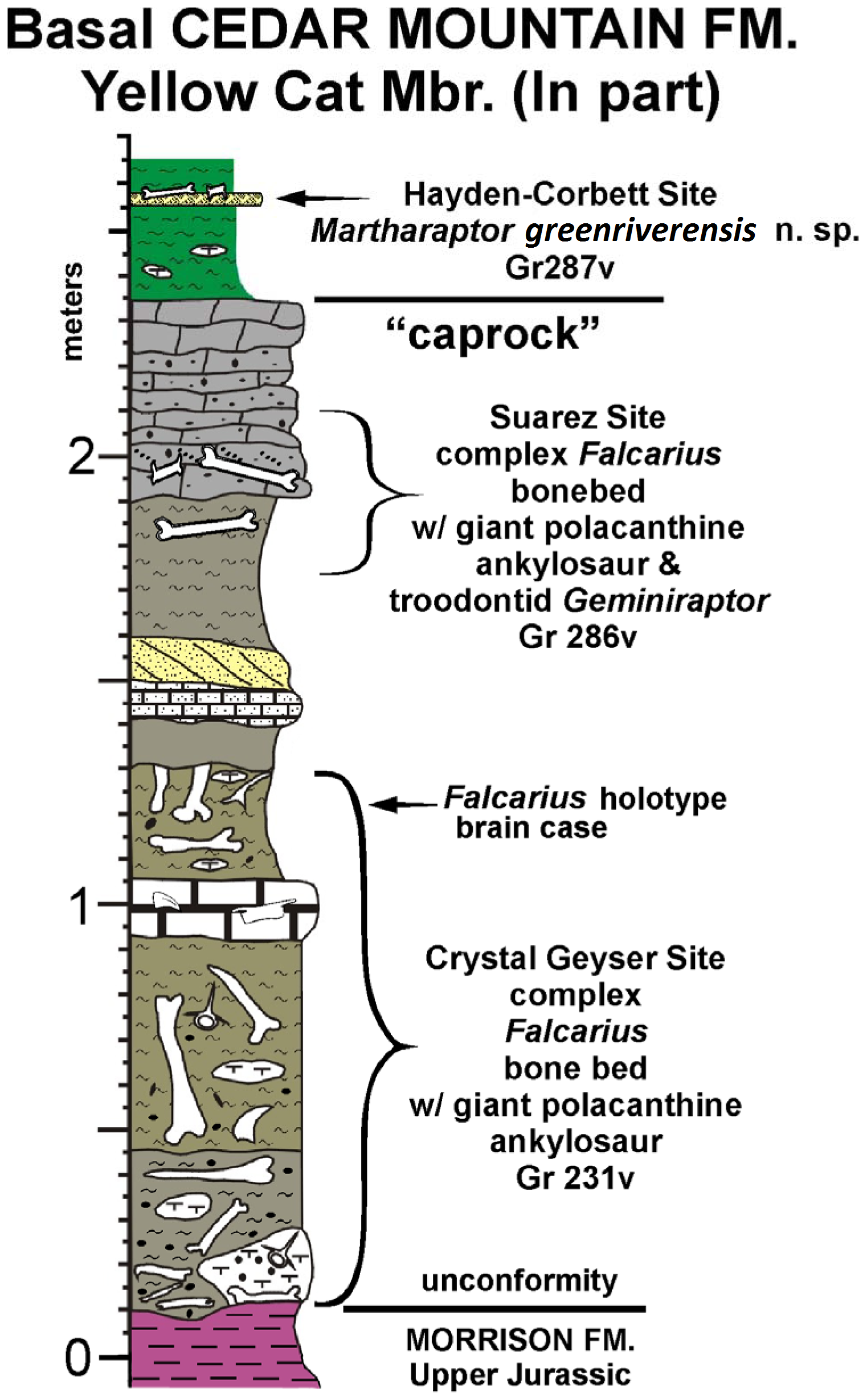
Stratigraphy of the Hayden-Corbett Site.png

The holotype specimen, UMNH VP 21400, hails from the Hayden-Corbett site of the Cedar Mountain Formation of Utah, approximately eight miles southeast from the city of Green River. The specimen was unearthed from a higher stratigraphic level (upper Yellow Cat Member) than Falcarius. The generic name, Martharaptor, is in honor to the paleontologist assistant Martha C. Hayden who helped in the discovery of the site, and the specific name, greenriverensis, is a reference to the Green River.

The specimen includes fragments of vertebrae, a scapula, forelimb and hindlimb bones, and an ischium. It also includes well-preserved manual unguals. Manual and pedal morphology show that the specimen is distinct from other theropods from the Cedar Mountain Formation and from other previously described therizinosauroids.

== Description ==
=== Forelimbs ===
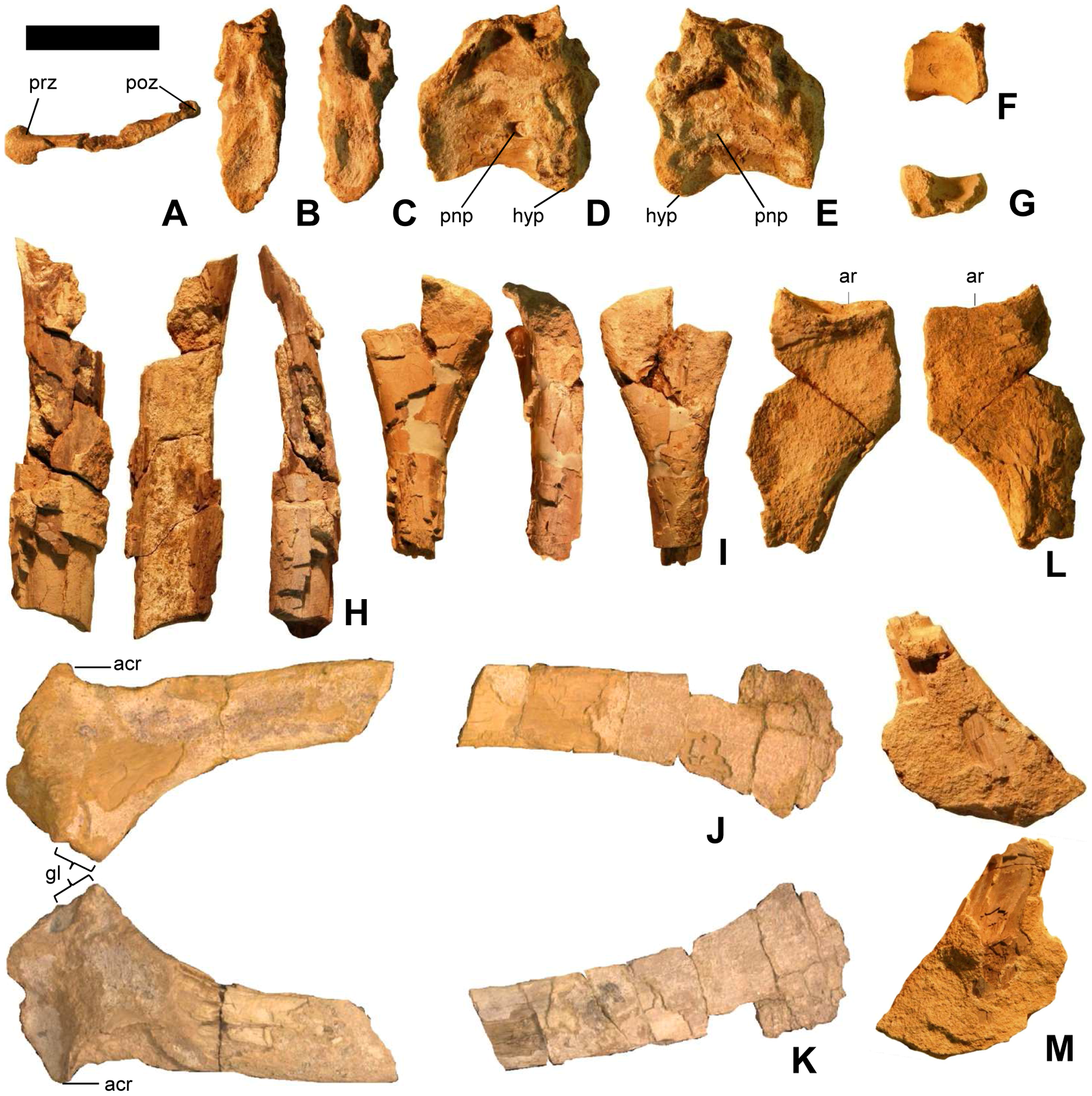
Vertebrae (A-G), possible forelimb bones (H-I), a scapula (J-K), and pelvic bones (L-M)

A pair of fragmentary elongated bones preserved next to each other may represent the radius and ulna of the antebrachium. Hand and finger bones are more well-preserved, with strongly ginglymoidal (pulley-shaped) joint surfaces. The manual unguals (hand claws) are very distinctive. Their height is greater than their length, and they are strongly curved. One of the preserved unguals is larger than the others, and it may represent the claw of the first finger. Other unguals are as large as each other, indicating that the second and third fingers had claws of equal size. The deep unguals of similar shape differs from the condition in other early therizinosauroids, which have longer unguals which differ in shape between different fingers.

=== Hindlimbs ===
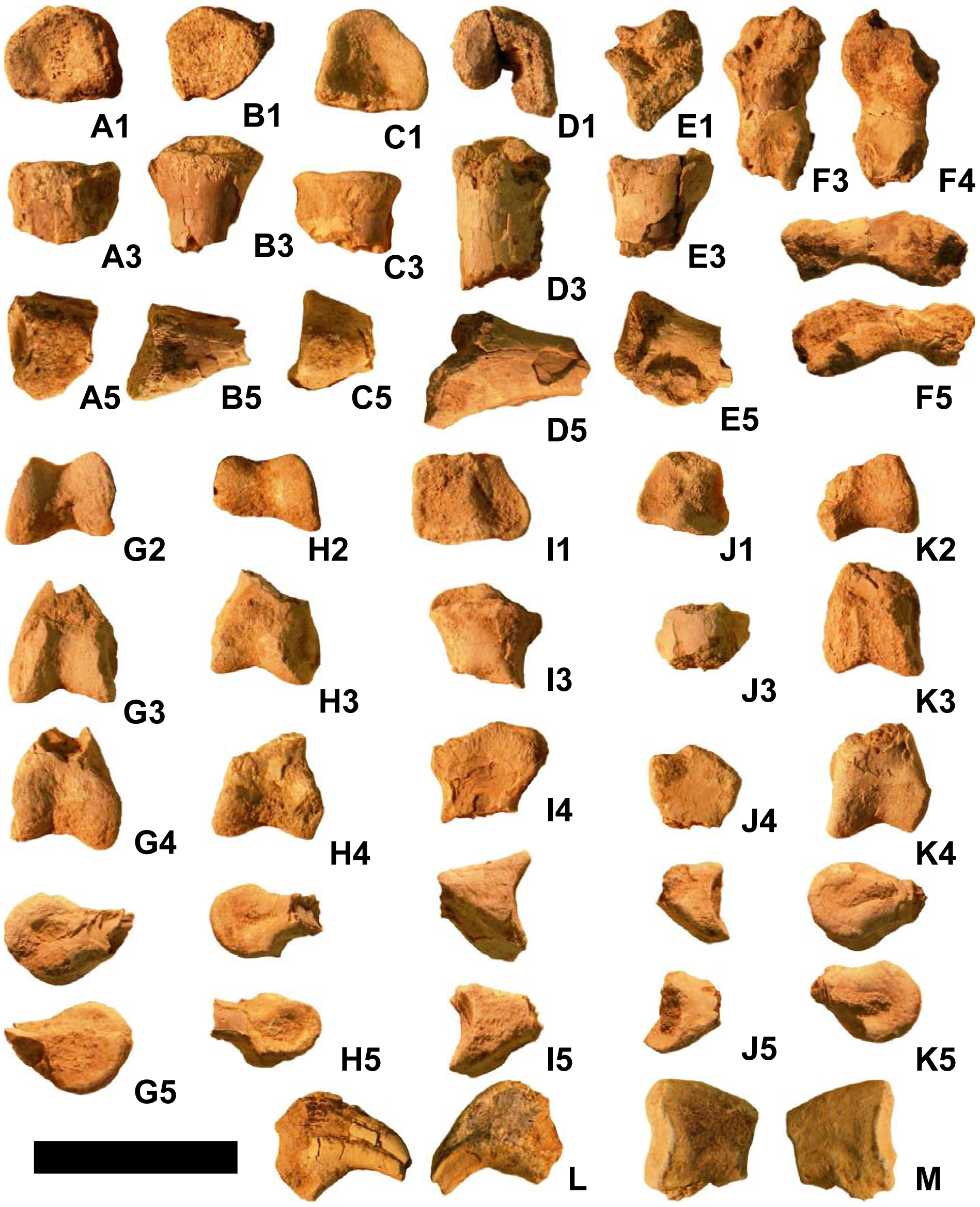
Foot finger bones

Several bones of the left foot are preserved. The first metatarsal thins towards the ankle, similar to most theropods but unlike therizinosaurids, indicating that the first toe did not contact the ground. In conjunction with this, the claw of the first toe is smaller than those of the other toes. On the other hand, the toe claws are all deep and curved, as in other therizinosauroids. The fourth metatarsal is beveled (slightly slopes to the side) compared to the rest of the foot. This is intermediate between Falcarius, which has no slope, and therizinosaurids, which have a fourth metatarsal angled at 90 degrees to the rest of the foot. None of the metatarsals are ginglymoidal, but the toe bones are.

=== Other bones ===
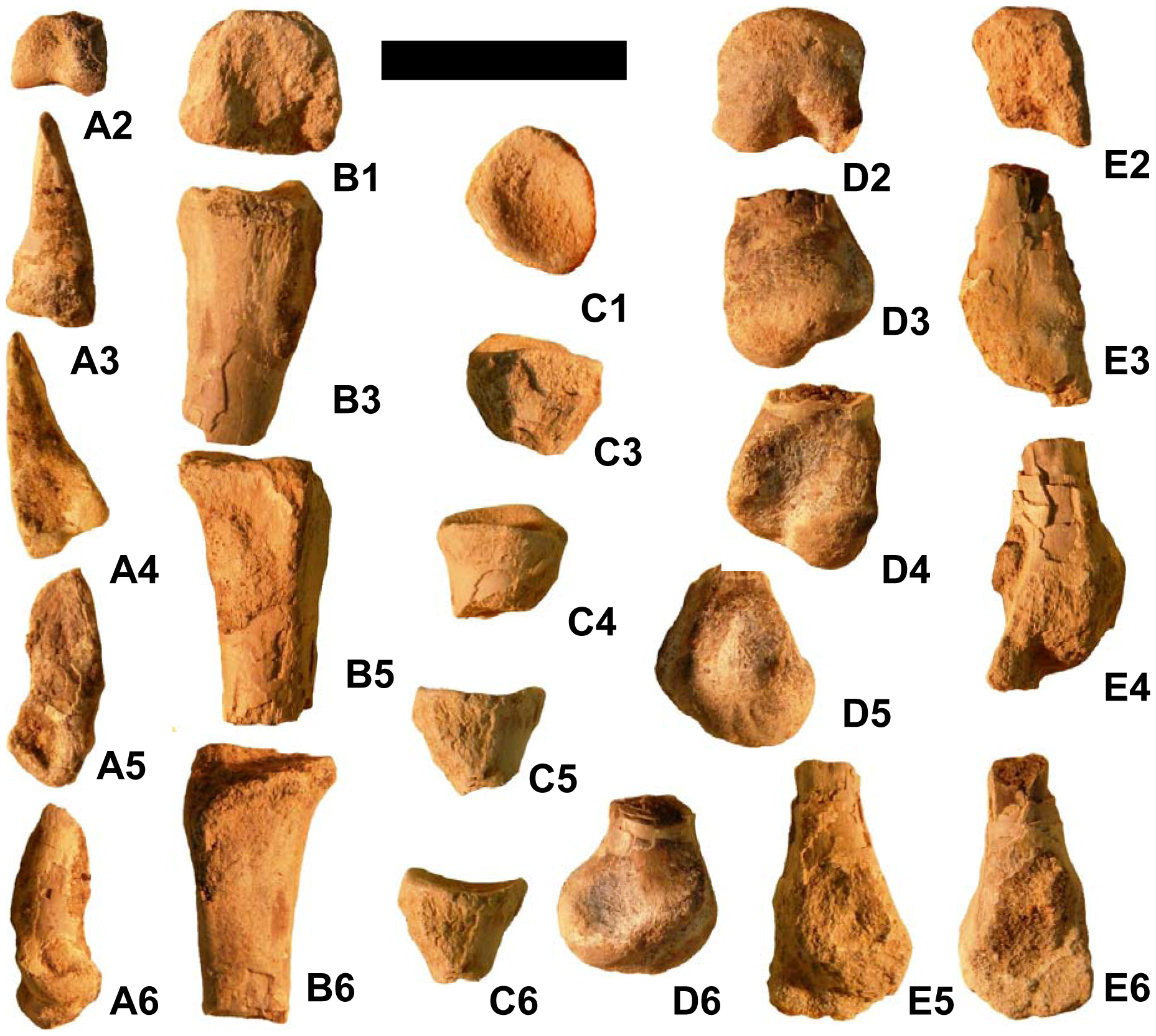
Metatarsal bones

The only preserved bone of the pectoral girdle is the left scapula (shoulder blade). This bone has a hatchet-like shape, expanded near the shoulder as in other therizinosauroids which preserve a scapula and measures about 15 cm (150 mm) long. The pelvis (hip) preserves fragments of the pubis and part of the ischium, which is very flattened (from the side) near the hip socket.

Three vertebral fragments are preserved. These include a strip of bone from the upper portion of a cervical (neck) vertebra, the centrum (main body) of a dorsal (back) vertebra, and the lower portion of a vertebra believed to be a distal caudal (i.e. from the tip of the tail). The cervical fragment shows that the prezygapophysis (front joint plate) is not flexed, indicating that the specimen was not a dromaeosaurid. Each side of the dorsal vertebra possessed a hypapophysis (rib facet) at its lower front corner and a pit located at the center of the side.

== Classification ==
Phylogenetic analysis placed Martharaptor within Therizinosauroidea as the sister taxon to the Alxasaurus + Therizinosauridae group, although support for this placement is weak. Nevertheless, Hartman et al. (2019) performed a phylogenetic analysis for the Therizinosauria corroborating the initial placement of Martharaptor.

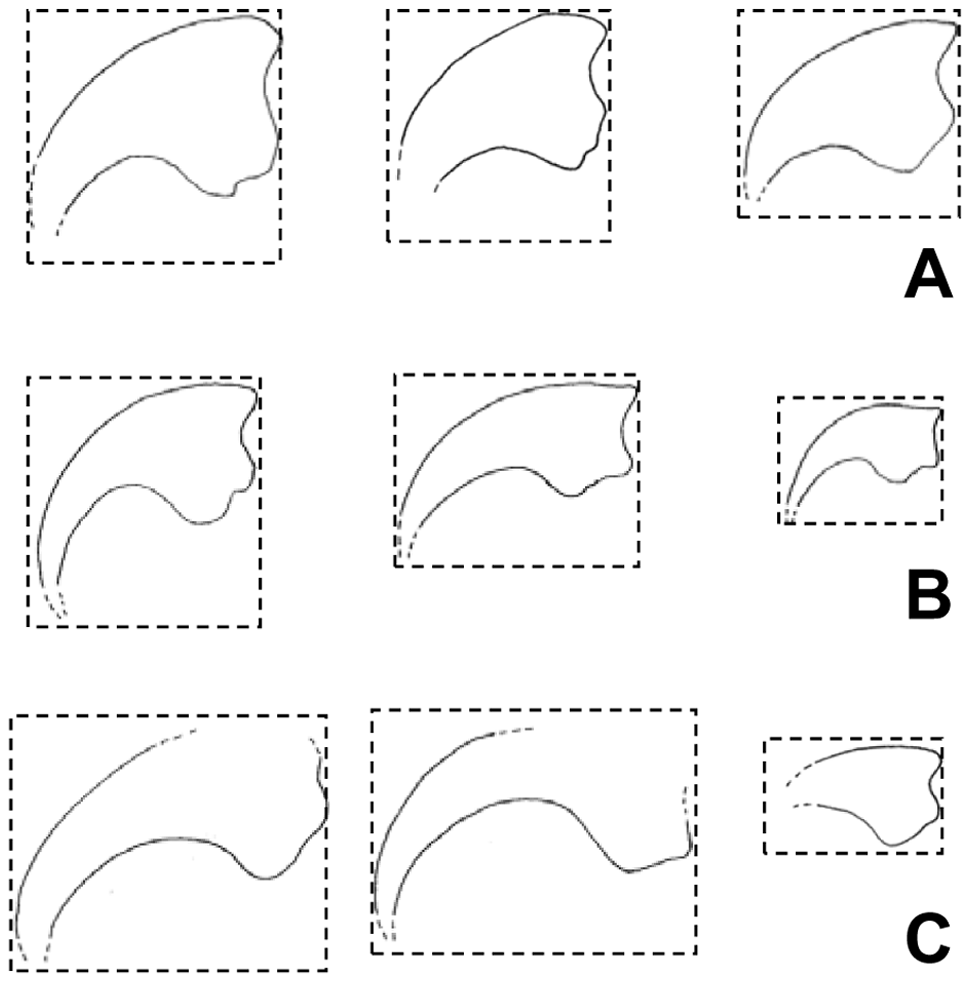
Comparison of therizinosauroid hand claws; A is Martharaptor

Left cladogram shows the probable placement of Martharaptor within Therizinosauroidea performed in the original description.

- Therizinosauroidea
  - Falcarius
  - - Beipiaosaurus
    - - Martharaptor
      - - Alxasaurus
        - - - - Therizinosauridae

== See also ==
- Timeline of therizinosaur research
