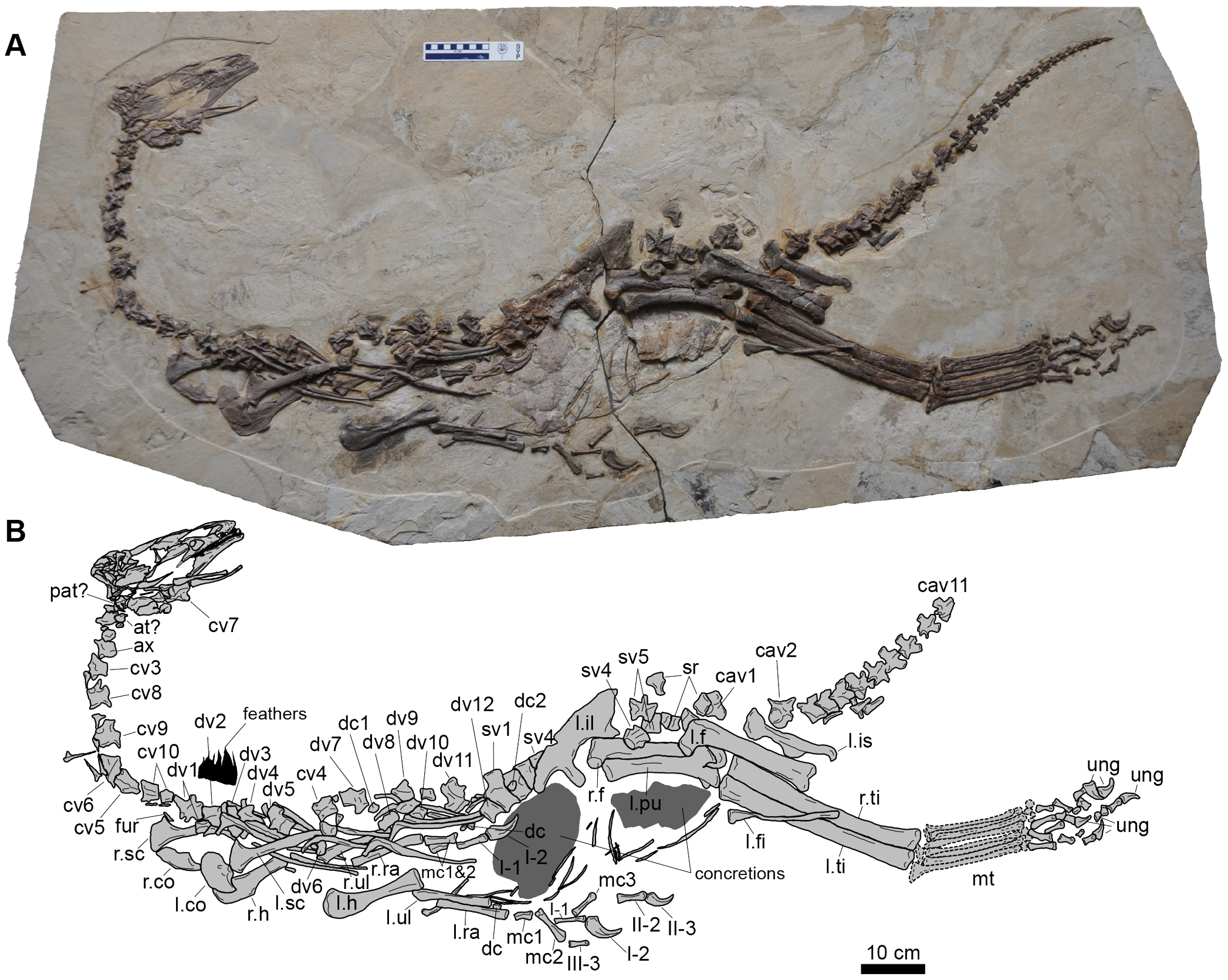
- Holotype specimen

Scientific classification
- Kingdom: Animalia
- Phylum: Chordata
- Class: Reptilia
- Clade: Dinosauria
- Clade: Saurischia
- Clade: Theropoda
- Clade: †Therizinosauria
- Genus: †Jianchangosaurus; Pu et al., 2013

Type species
- Jianchangosaurus yixianensis Pu et al., 2013

= Jianchangosaurus =

Jianchangosaurus Temporal range: Early Cretaceous, ~126 Ma

Extinct genus of dinosaurs

Jianchangosaurus ("lizard from Jianchang County") is a genus of therizinosaurian dinosaur that lived approximately 126 million years ago during the early part of the Cretaceous Period from the Yixian Formation in what is now China. The type specimen, a juvenile, was discovered in Jianchang County, in the western part of Liaoning Province. It was described in 2013 by a team of palaeontologists from the Henan Museum, who determined that it was among the most basal therizinosaurs.

Based on the type specimen, Jianchangosaurus was a small, lightly built, bipedal, ground-dwelling herbivore, which could grow up to an estimated 2 m (6.6 ft) long and was 1 m (3.3 ft) high at the hips. It probably had a body mass of around 26 kg (57 lb). In spite of its basal position, Jianchangosaurus already bore many of the hallmarks of therizinosaur anatomy, such as a beaked premaxilla, and the shape of the pubic boot. Jianchangosaurus' tibia was about half as long again as the femur, suggesting cursorial (running) habits.

== Discovery and naming ==
The holotype of Jianchangosaurus (41HIII-0308A) is the nearly complete skeleton of a single juvenile, missing only the distal (far) portion of the tail, and some minor elements. It was discovered in Jianchang County, in the western part of Liaoning Province. The strata it was recovered from belong to the Yixian Formation, a Lagerstätte known for its vertebrate fossils. It was purchased by the Henan Geological Museum (now the Henan Museum), who prepared it, unintentionally repositioning some of the elements in the process. In 2013, Hanyong Pu, Yoshitsugu Kobayashi, Junchang Lu, Li Xu, Yanhua Wu, Huali Chang, Jiming Zhang, and Songhai Jia published a paper describing 41HIII-0308A. They designating as it the holotype of a new genus and species of basal therizinosaur, Jianchangosaurus yixianensis. The genus name is derived from the county where the specimen was found, and the Greek word "sauros" (σαυρος), meaning "lizard". The specific name yixianensis, refers to the Yixian Formation where the specimen was found, and the Latin suffix "-ensis" meaning "originating in".

== Description ==
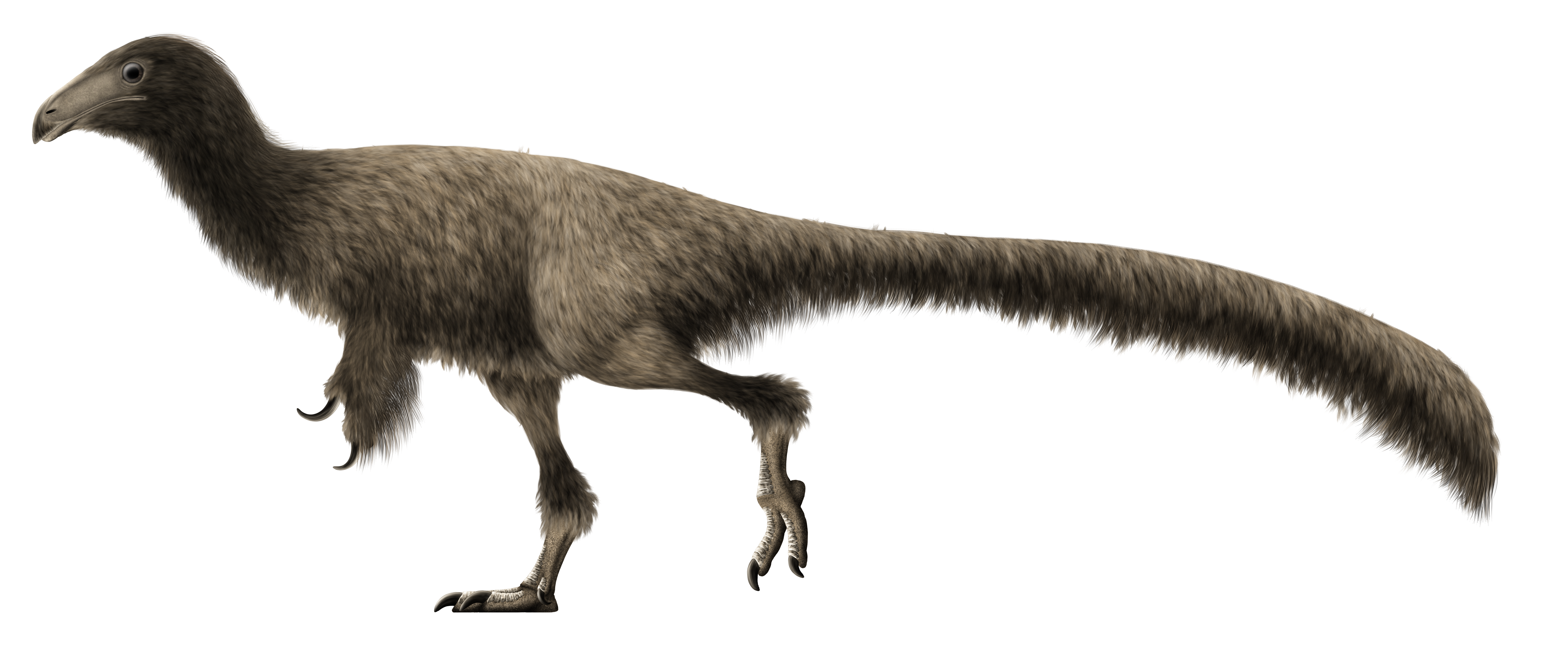
Life restoration

Jianchangosaurus was estimated to have been 1 m (3.3 ft) tall at the hips and approximately 2 m (6.6 ft) long. Gregory S. Paul estimated the weight of the holotype specimen around 20 kg (44 lb), though expressed uncertainty about its total body length, due to the fact that tail tip is unpreserved. In 2024, he suggested a higher body mass of 26 kg (57 lb)

=== Skull and dentition ===
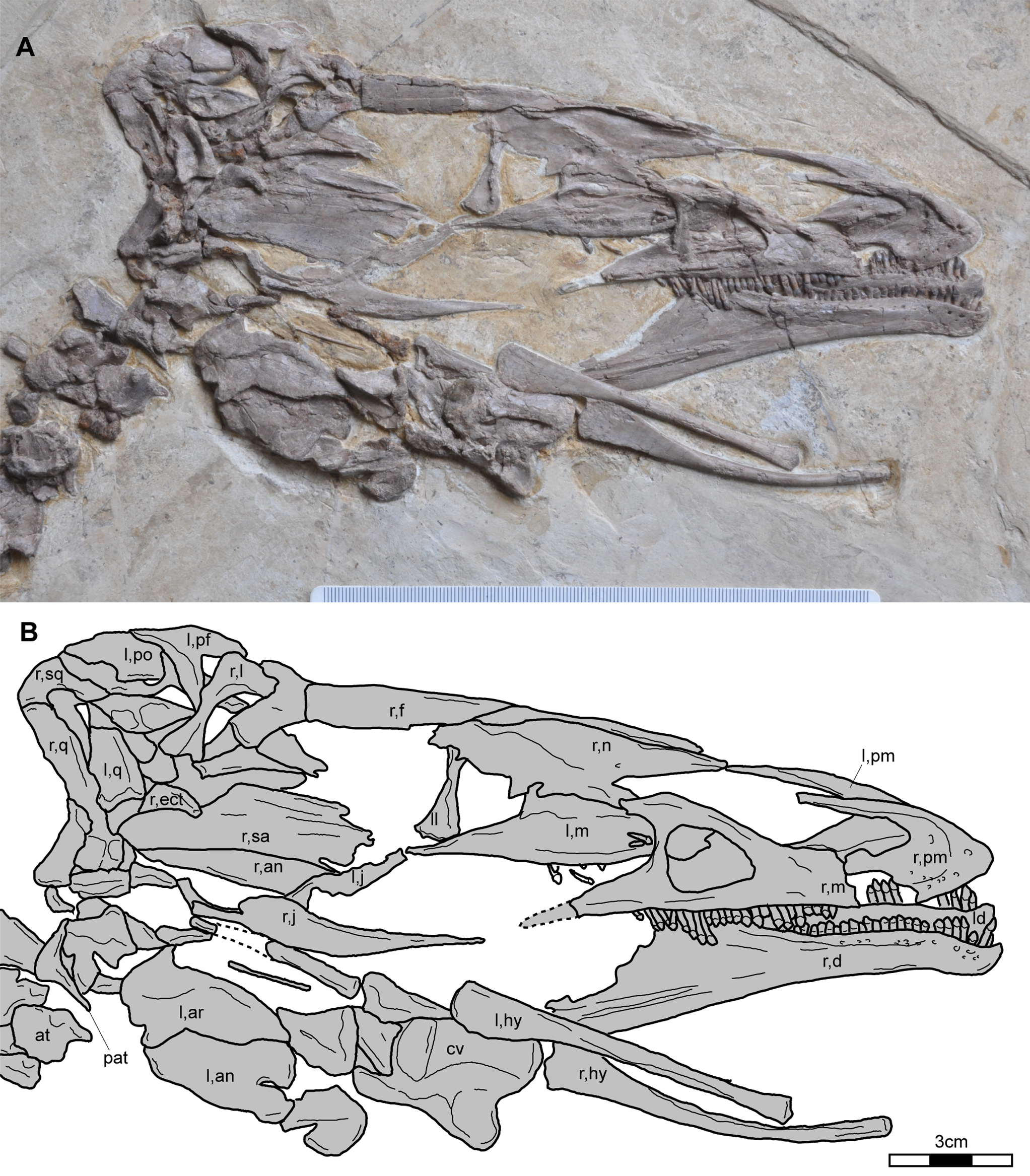
Close up of the skull

The skull of Jianchangosaurus' holotype is fairly well-preserved, lacking only a few elements. It measures 23 cm (9.1 in) in height, and 11 cm (4.3 in) in height. The premaxilla and the anterior (front) portion of the maxilla are edentulous, meaning they lacked teeth. The premaxilla is lined with small foramina, suggesting that a beak was present. The dorsal (top) border of the antorbital fenestra is formed by the lacrimal, maxilla, and nasal, with the majority being formed by the latter. The posterior (rear) portion of the nasal is wide transversely (from side to side), as in Falcarius. The jugal does not participate in the antorbital fenestra's margin, unlike many other coelurosaurs. The prefrontals are triangular, with a V-shaped anterodorsal region (at the top and towards the front) which contacts the lacrimal. The condyloid (articular) process of the quadrate, to which the lower jaw was articulated, was rounded. Jianchangosaurus' dentary was triangular in lateral view, with a downturned symphyseal region, as in other therizinosaurs (with the exception of Falcarius). At very front of the dentary was a toothless region called a diastema.

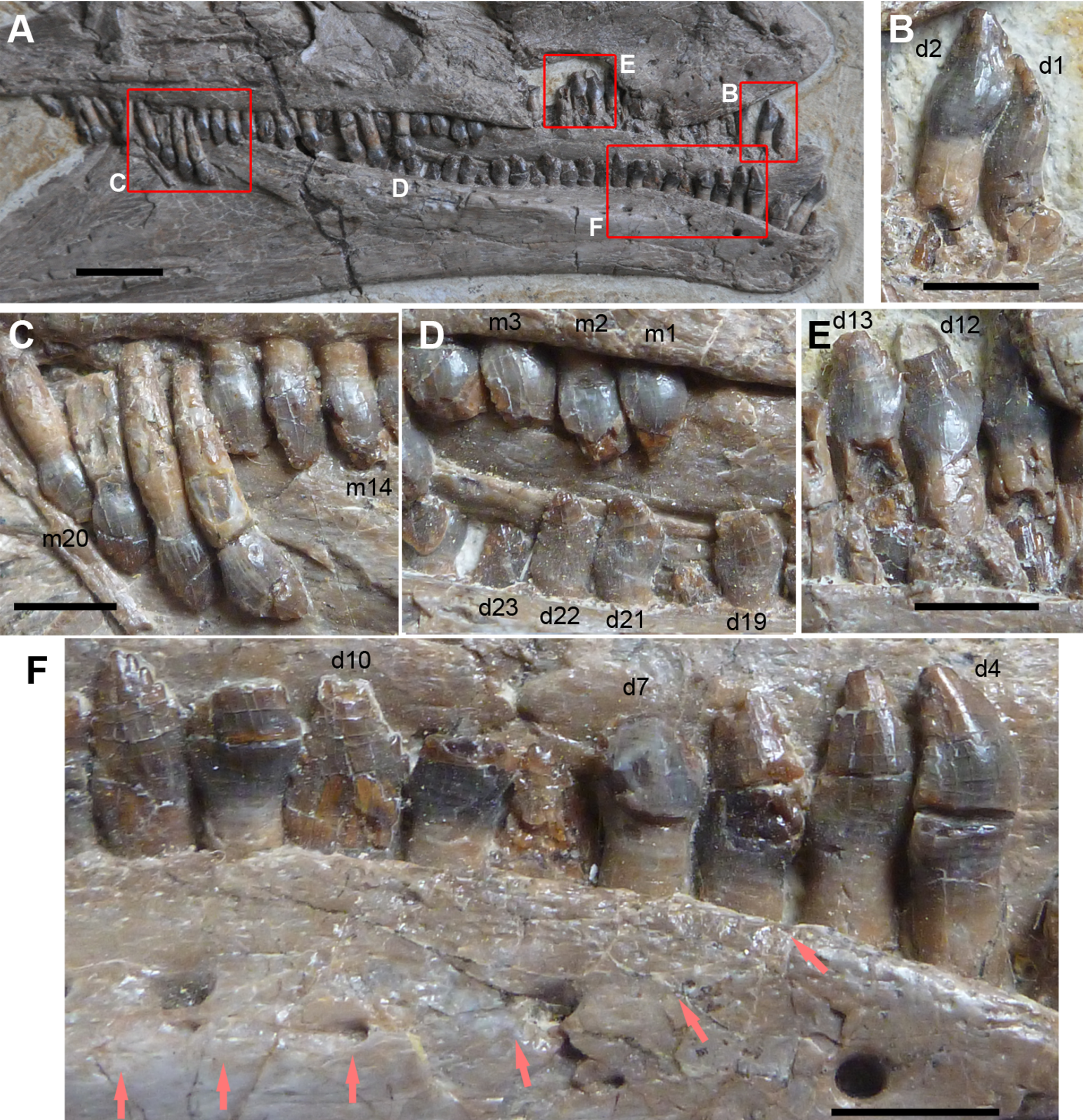
Dentition

Jianchangosaurus had twenty-seven maxillary teeth, and an unknown number of dentary teeth (probably between twenty-five and twenty-eight). This tooth count is similar to that observed in other therizinosaurs, like Erlikosaurus, Falcarius, and Segnosaurus. The teeth were small and lanceolate (shaped like the tip of a lance). The teeth consistently have three denticles of equal size. In the anterior portion of the maxilla, before the edentulous region, the teeth were more densely packed. The anterior dentary teeth were similarly sized to those further back, unlike in Falcarius. The outside surface of each maxillary tooth was convex, while the outside surface of each dentary tooth was concave. A similar dental morphology is seen in ornithopods and ceratopsians, and likely maximised biting stress during occlusion, allowing Jianchangosaurus to more effectively slice plant fibres.

=== Postcranial skeleton ===
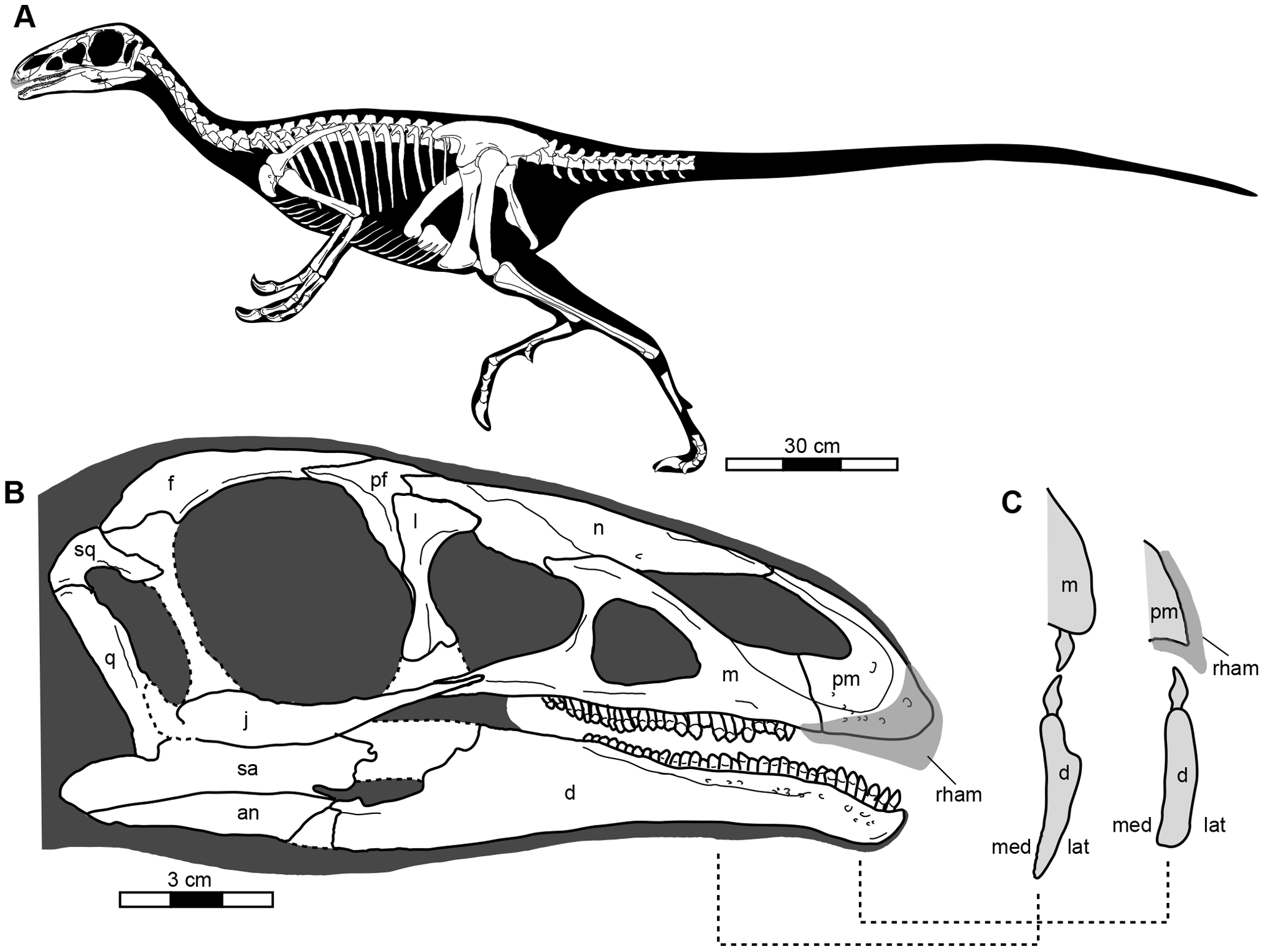
Skeletal restoration

Ten cervical (neck) vertebrae are preserved in Jianchangosaurus, consisting of the atlas (first cervical vertebra), axis (second cervical vertebra), and all of the following vertebrae. All of the preserved cervical vertebrae are amphicoelous, meaning that they were concave at both ends, and were also highly pneumatised. The postzygapophysis of the atlas was short, with a rounded posterior end. The axis had longer postzygapophyses, which extended posterior to its short neural spine, and were longer than the prezygapophyses. The third to sixth cervicals were longer than those at the front. The neural arches of the middle and posterior cervicals were X-shaped in dorsal view, like other therizinosaurs, and like oviraptorosaurs. The dorsal (back) vertebrae of Jianchangosaurus had longer neural spines than any of the cervicals. The anterior dorsal vertebrae lacked prominent hypapophyses; finer details are difficult to discern, as in the holotype they are obscured by the ribs. The neural spines had rounded tips in the case of the anterior vertebrae, though in the middle to posterior dorsal vertebrae, they transition to a more square shape. At least sixteen gastralia, bones which would have supported the abdominal organs and served as muscle attachment sites, were present. They were spint-like in shape. Like other basal therizinosaurs, Jianchangosaurus had five sacral vertebrae. Eleven caudal (tail) vertebrae are preserved, consisting of the entire caudal column up to the eleventh. The neural spines of the caudal vertebrae were tilted posteriorly, with distal tips split into anterior and posterior alae.

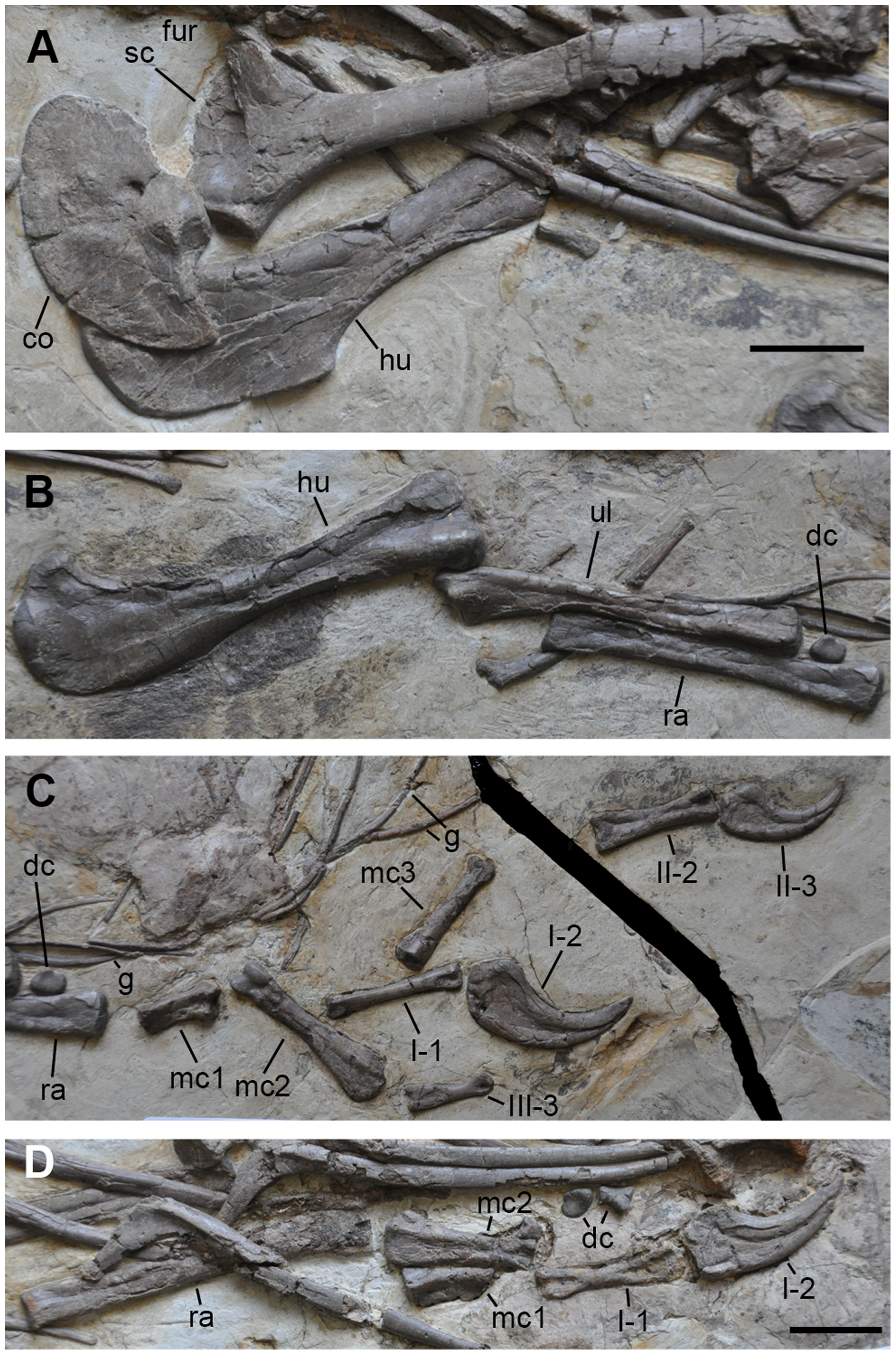
Pectoral girdle and forelimbs of Jianchangosaurus yixianensis

The scapula and coracoid of Jianchangosaurus were unfused, like in other basal therizinosaurs, though this may be due to its nature as a juvenile. The glenoid of each scapula faced posteriorly. The scapular blade was straight, and remains nearly consistent in width for the entirety of its length. This is unlike the condition of other therizinosaurs, which either increased or decreased the width of the scapular blade. The coracoid was similar to that of ornithomimosaurs, having a cemicircular outline with a prominent posterior process. The humerus measured 158.5 mm (6.2 in) in length, slightly shorter than the scapula. Like in other basal therizinosaurs, both ends were moderately expanded. The internal tuberosity was large, and was separated from the humeral head by a depression, similar to in Falcarius. Unlike other therizinosaurs, the entepicondyle was reduced. The ulna was around seventy-seven percent as long as the humerus, a ratio also seen in Falcarius. Its proximal (near) tip was triangular, with a poorly developed olecranon process compared to other therizinosaurs. The radius was straight and lacked a biceps tubercle, again similar to Falcarius. Four distal carpals are preserved, including the semilunate carpal that characterises maniraptorans. All metacarpals are preserved, except for the third right metacarpal. The longest preserved phalanx (digit bone; finger bone, in this case) is the first, slightly shorter than the second metacarpal. The manual unguals (hand claws) were curved, and were narrow transversely. The flexor tubercles of all unguals, to which the flexor tendons attached, were rounded. A groove on the medial surface of each ungual reaches the dorsal surface at its tip.

The pelvis of Jianchangosaurus bore several features that were primitive to Coelurosauia, though absent in more derived therizinosaurs. The ilium was low, with a nearly horizontal dorsal edge, a shallow process before the acetabulum (the preacetabular process), and a deep process after it (postacetabular process). The pubis is shorter than the ischium. It projects anteroventrally. As such, unlike more derived therizinosaurs, it is not opisthopubic, meaning that it was not oriented backwards. The femur was straight, with a cylindrical lesser trochanter that was separated from the greater trochanter by a cleft. The neck of the femoral head is weakly constructed. The fourth trochanter is not known. The tibia is around half as long again as the femur, the highest ratio seen in therizinosaurs; such an adaptation strongly correlates to cursorial habits in dinosaurs. The fibula is narrower than the tibia. It is not clear how many of Jianchangosaurus' metatarsals are real, as most appear to have been restored. Most pedal (foot) phalanges cannot be identified, as most are crushed, and elements from the manus (hand) may be mixed in. Four pedal unguals are known, all with poorly developed flexor tubercules. All of them are recurved and transversely compressed, similar to in Erlikosaurus.

=== Feather impressions ===
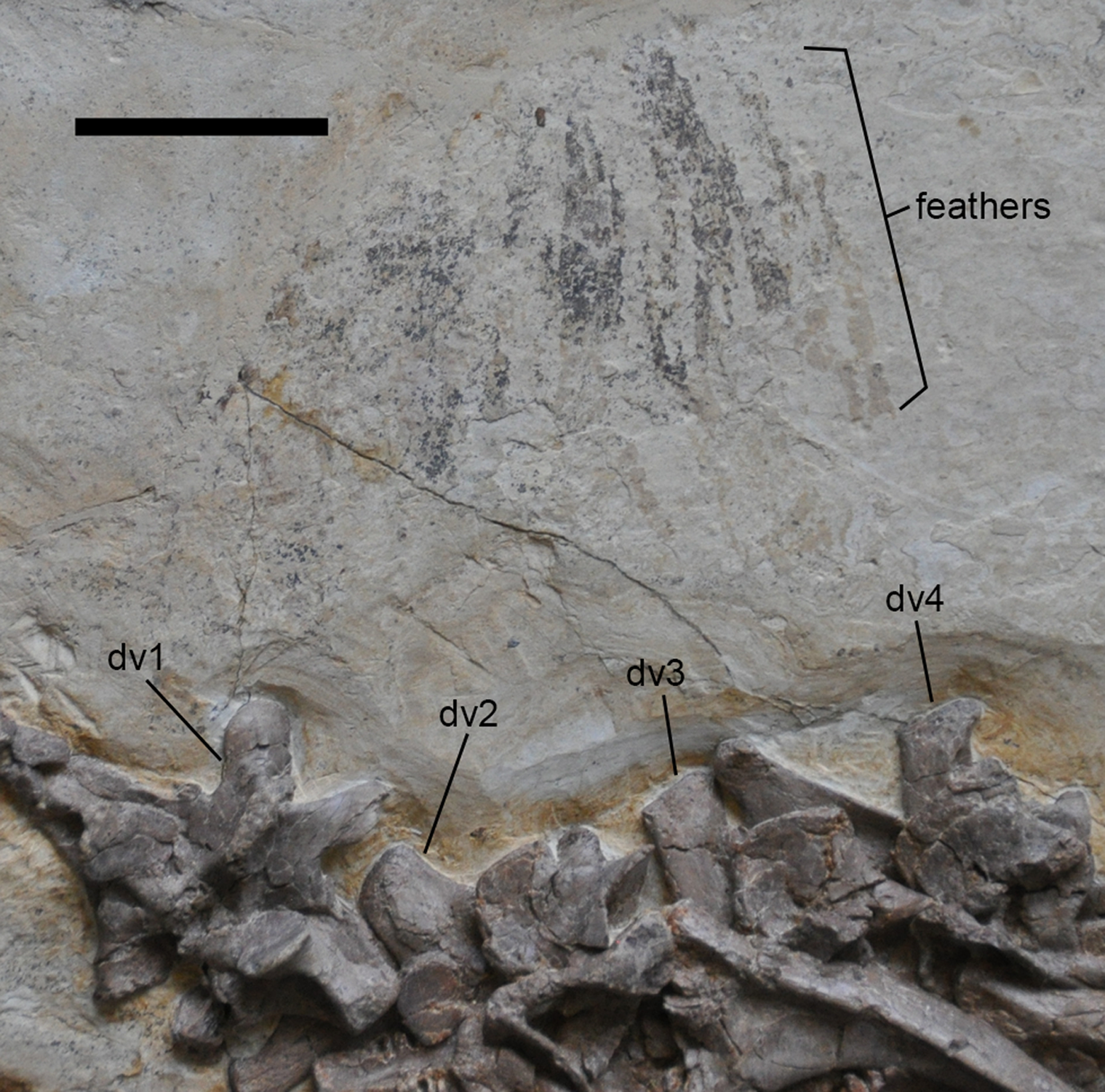
Feather impressions

The impressions of a series of wide and unbranched feathers surround the holotype of Jianchangosaurus. Only their distal ends are visible. The feathers, considered elongated broad filamentous feathers (EBFFs), are similar to those of Beipiaosaurus, from the same formation. The describers of Jianchangosaurus speculated that they may have been used for visual display.

== Taxonomy ==
=== Classification ===
Like the primitive Falcarius and Beipiaosaurus, Jianchangosaurus was classified as a basal therizinosaur. Phylogenetic analysis suggests that it is more derived than Falcarius but more primitive than Beipiaosaurus. Jianchangosaurus is the only known therizinosaur that possesses a tail with caudal centra that are oval in shape.

Left cladogram is based on the phylogenetic analysis conducted by Pu et al. 2013, showing the relationships of Jianchangosaurus as a very primitive therizinosaur. Right cladogram is based on Hartman et al. 2019 which has corroborated the position of Jianchangosaurus:

- Therizinosauria
  - Falcarius
  - - Jianchangosaurus
    - Therizinosauroidea
      - Beipiaosaurus
      - - Alxasaurus
        - - - - Therizinosauridae

- Therizinosauria
  - Falcarius
  - - Jianchangosaurus
    - Therizinosauroidea
      - Beipiaosaurus
      - - "Chilantaisaurus" zheziangensis
        - Enigmosaurus
        - Alxasaurus
        - - - - Therizinosauridae

The validity of Jianchangosaurus was called into question by Cau (2024), who considered it to be a junior synonym of the contemporary Beipiaosaurus since the diagnosis distinguishing the taxa was based on ontogenetically variable characters. In their 2026 description of the contemporary Kayrasaurus, Liao and colleagues supported the validity and distinction of all four Yixian therizinosaurs, with Jianchangosaurus and Lingyuanosaurus being better adapted to running, and Beipiaosaurus and Kayrasaurus having a less cursorial and more robust morphology.

== See also ==
- Timeline of therizinosaur research
