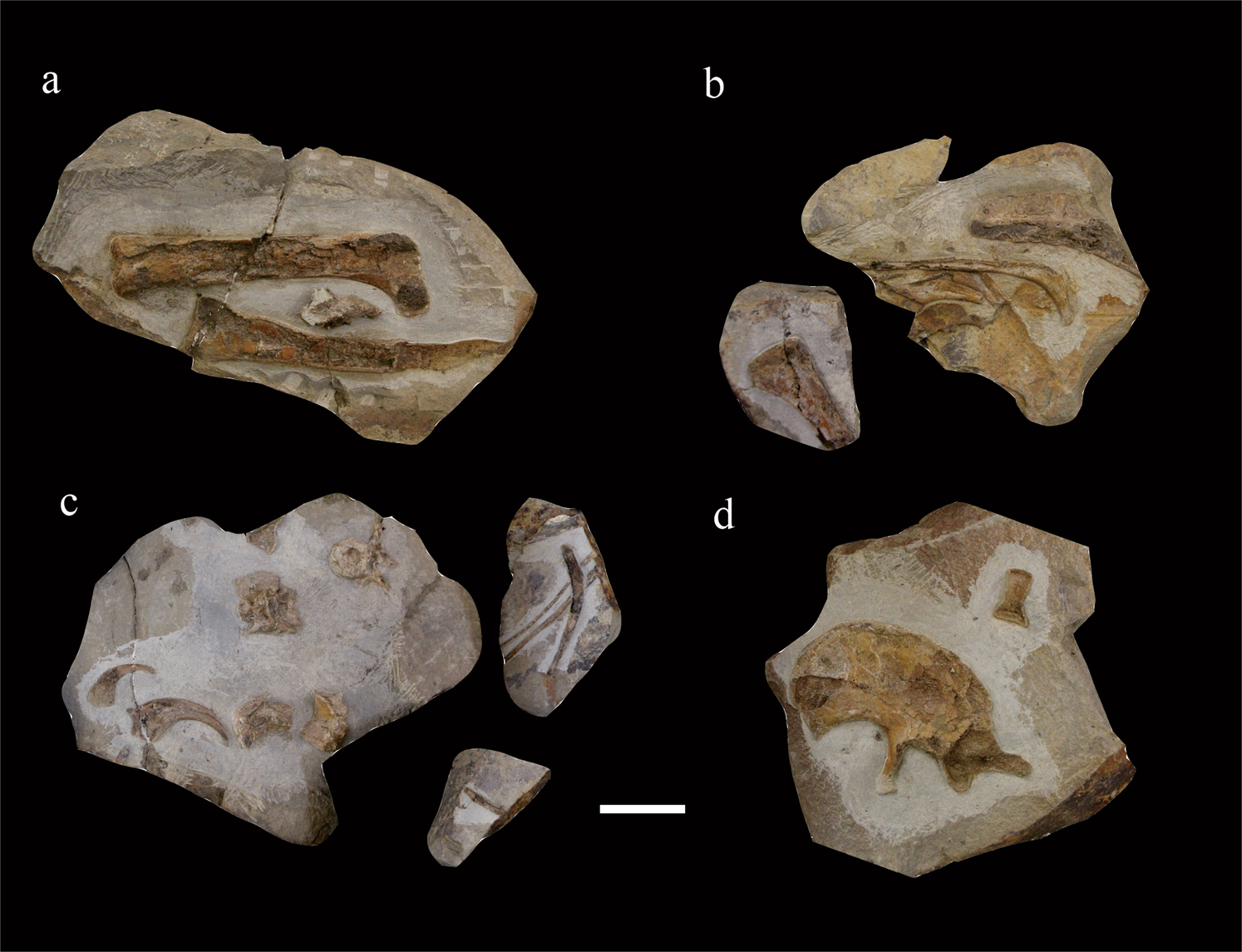
- Holotype specimen as originally preserved in slabs of rock before preparation

Scientific classification
- Kingdom: Animalia
- Phylum: Chordata
- Class: Reptilia
- Clade: Dinosauria
- Clade: Saurischia
- Clade: Theropoda
- Clade: Maniraptora
- Clade: †Therizinosauria
- Genus: †Lingyuanosaurus; Yao et al., 2019

Type species
- †Lingyuanosaurus sihedangensis Yao et al., 2019

= Lingyuanosaurus =

Lingyuanosaurus Temporal range: Early Cretaceous, ~133–120 Ma

Extinct genus of dinosaurs

Lingyuanosaurus is a genus of therizinosaurian theropod from the Early Cretaceous of Liaoning Province, China. The type and only species is L. sihedangensis. It was uncovered within one of the formations that make up the Jehol biota, although the exact geological formation — and therefore also its precise geological age — is unknown.

== Discovery ==
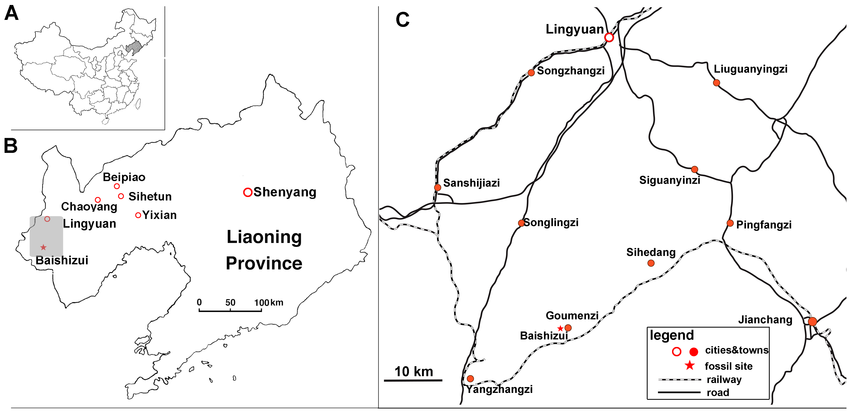
A map of the area of China where Lingyuanosaurus was found, with the town of Sihedang visible on the left (C)

The holotype of Lingyuanosaurus, given the designation IVPP V 23589, was discovered at a fossil locality near a town called Sihedang. The specimen was recovered inside of seven rock slabs of varying sizes. The locality is just outside of the city of Lingyuan in Liaoning Province. The precise age of this locality is uncertain. The strata from which the holotype was found are a part of the Jehol Group, but it is not known for certain if they belong to the Yixian Formation or to the Jiufotang Formation. Given the fact that the entire specimen was found in a one-square-meter area, no other fossils were found in proximity, there were no duplicated elements, and all the bones had the same color and preservation, the fossils are regarded as belonging to a single individual.

Lingyuanosaurus was formally described and named in 2019 in a publication authored by Xi Yao, Chun-Chi Liao, Corwin Sullivan, and Xu Xing. The generic name, Lingyuanosaurus, is in reference to county-level city of Lingyuan, and the Ancient Greek word saûros (σαῦρος), Latinized as saurus, meaning "lizard". The specific name, sihedangensis, is in reference to its place of discovery as well, the town of Sihedang.

== Description ==
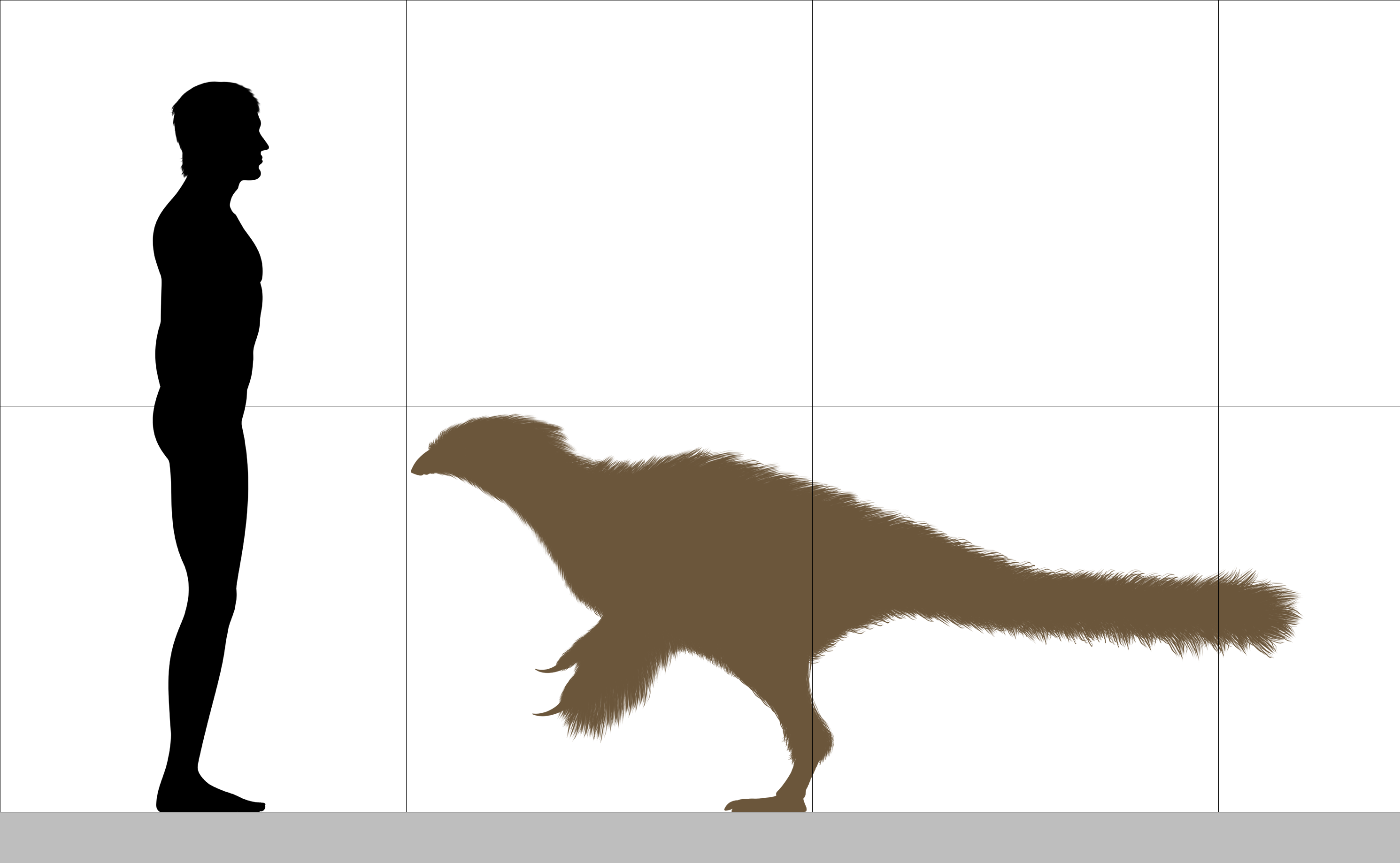
Size diagram of Beipiaosaurus, a rough size-analogue for Lingyuanosaurus

Lingyuanosaurus was a relatively small therizinosaurian, similar in size to the closely related Beipiaosaurus at about 2.2 m (7.2 ft) long. The femur of the specimen was only 200 mm (7.9 in) long, and Yao and colleagues used its circumference to estimate a weight of about 12 kg (26 lb). Lingyuanosaurus also had a mix of both basal and derived features, indicating that therizinosauroids were undergoing an evolutionary transition around the time that these three taxa lived.

The holotype, and only specimen, IVPP V 23589 consists of several bones of the postcranial skeleton including the vertebral centrum of a cervical vertebra, five partial vertebrae (dorsals, sacrals, and caudals), a single complete caudal vertebrae, several ribs from the middle and lower back, the proximal half of the right humerus, the distal half of the left humerus, two manual unguals, a mostly complete ilium, part of an ischium, the right femur, part of the left tibia, part of the right astragalus, and several pieces of bone that could not be identified. The anatomy preserved in these bones allowed the describers to name Lingyuanosaurus as a new taxon, distinct from both Beipiaosaurus and the closely-related and roughly contemporaneous Jianchangosaurus. Lingyuanosaurus can be distinguished from all other therizinosaurs by the following combination of traits: a lamina (or "plate") present on the dorsal vertebrae separating the two infradiapophyseal fossae, unique anatomy of the hyposphene-hypantrum articulation, and an ilium with a strongly convex upper edge and a concave lower edge, and the presence of a roughly triangle-shaped fossa just above the pubic peduncle.

Photos of the holotype (IVPP V 23589)
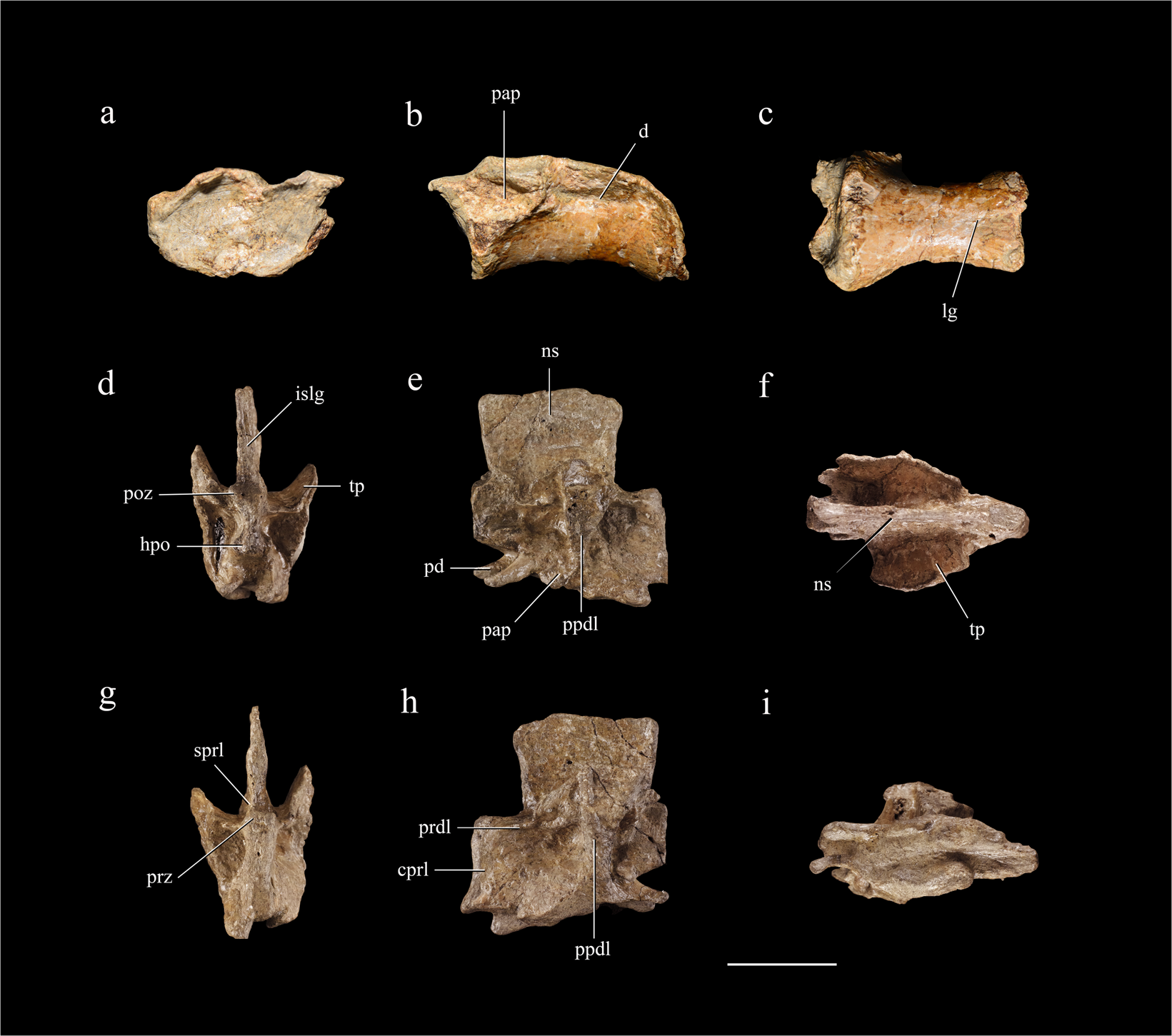
Cervical (a-c) and dorsal (d-i) vertebrae

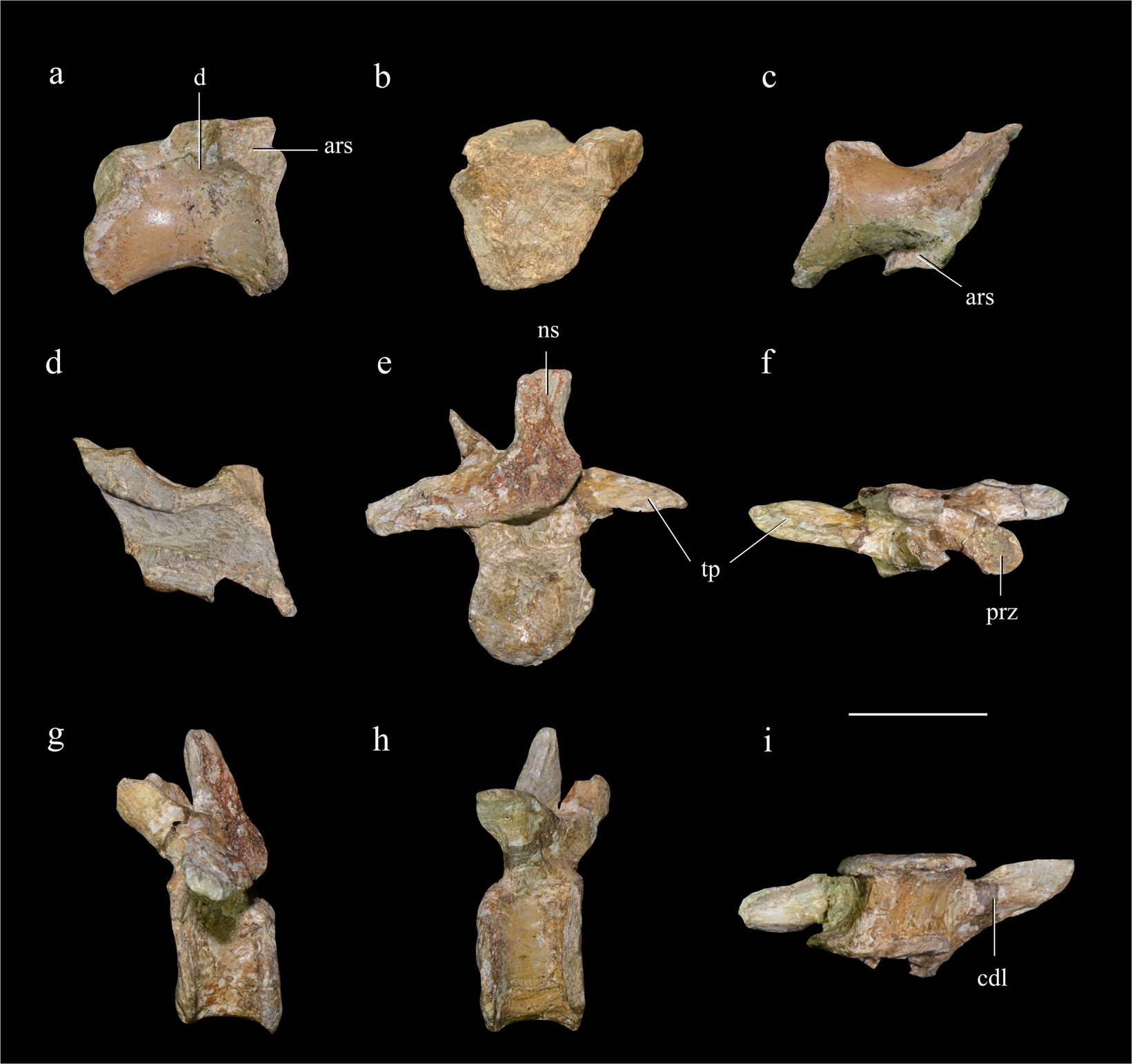
Sacral (a-c) and caudal (d-i) vertebrae

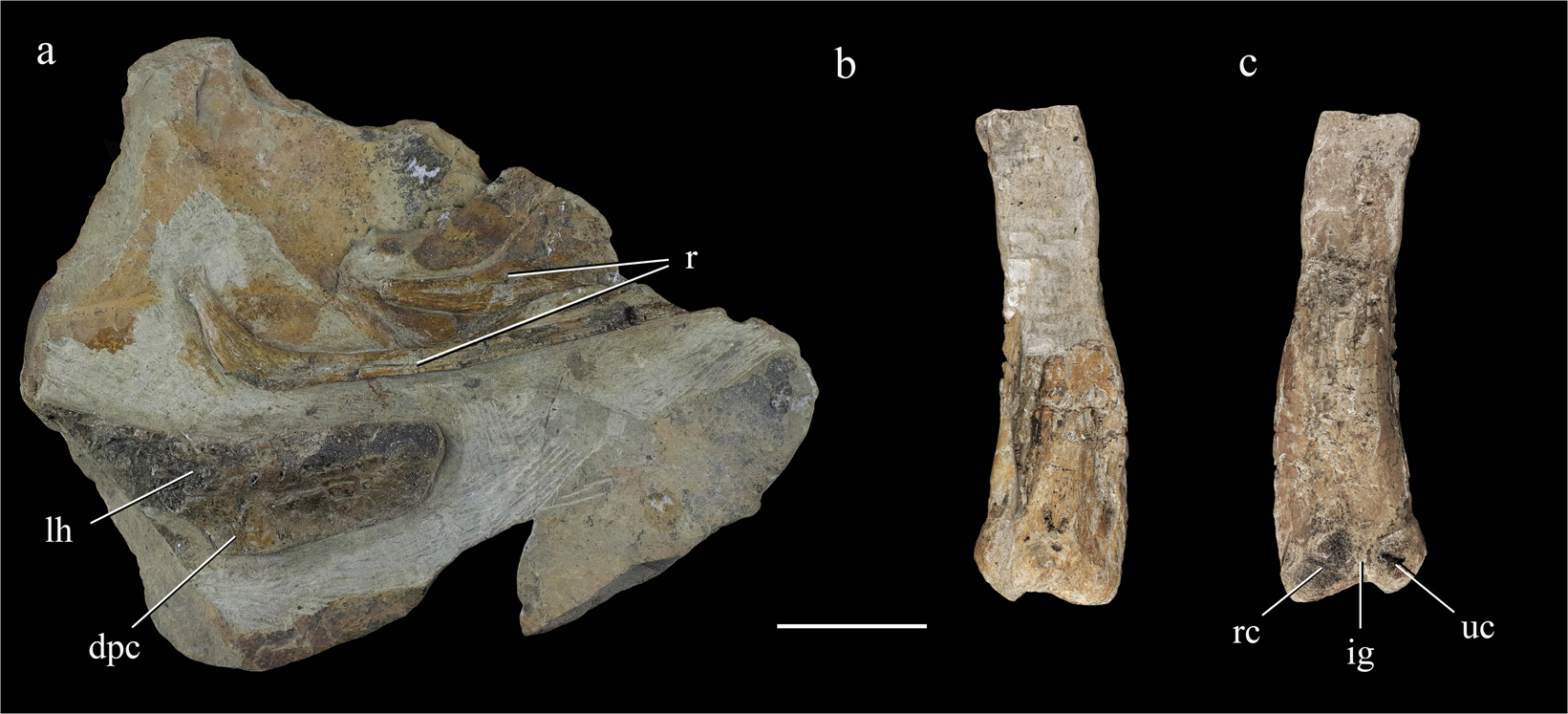
Ribs (left) and humeri (right)

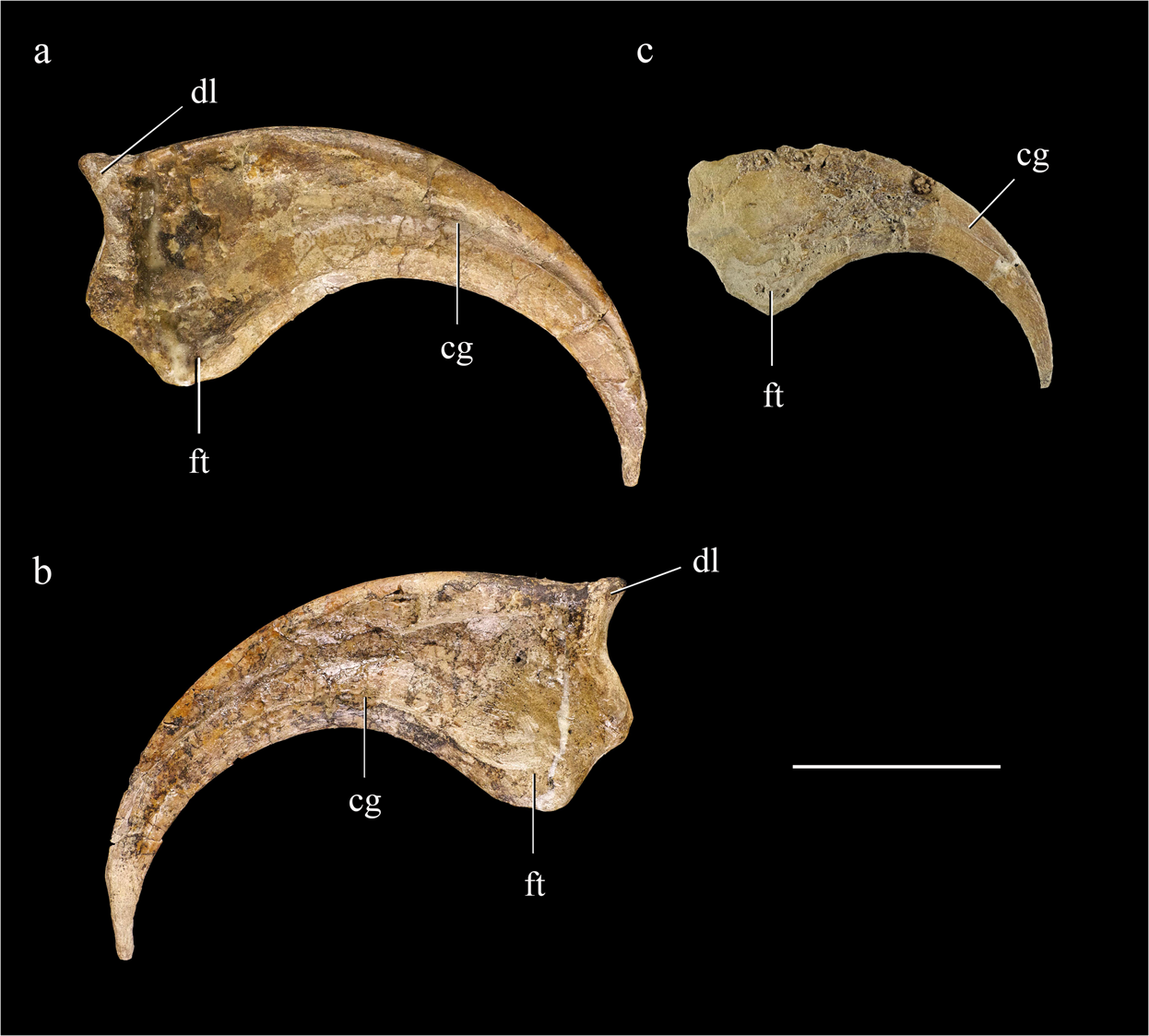
Hand claws

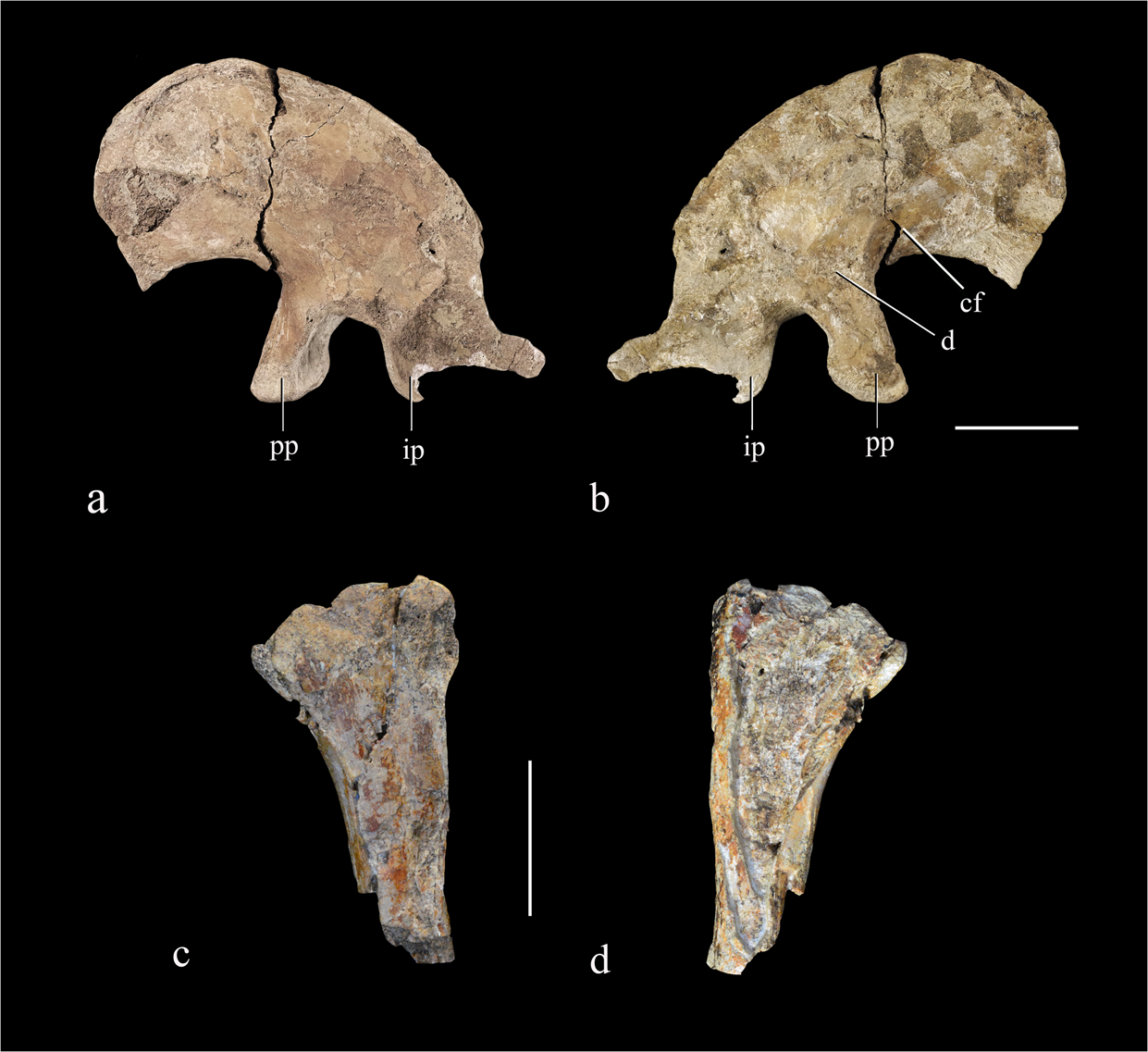
Ilium (top) and ischium (bottom)

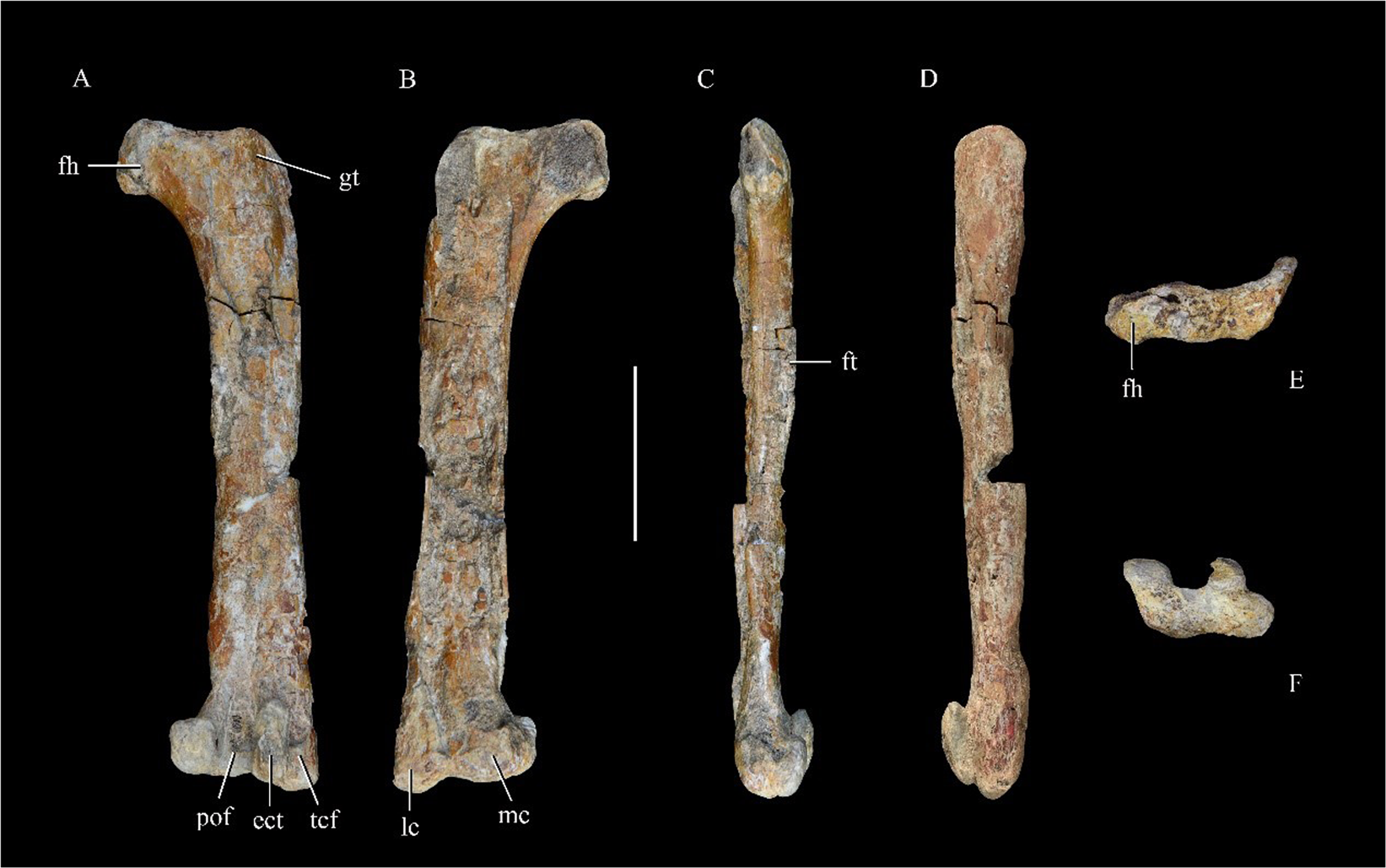
Femur

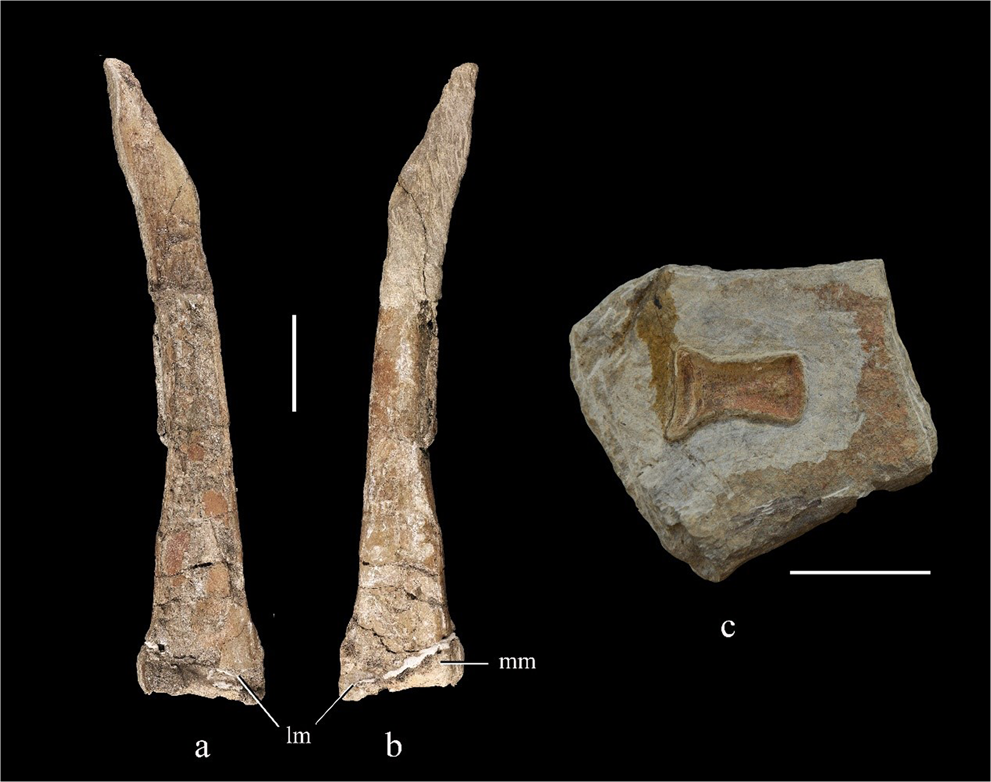
Tibia (left) and astragalus (right)

In their description of Lingyuanosaurus, Yao and colleagues suggested that the specimen was probably not fully-grown when it died. They inferred this from the fact that the vertebrae that are preserved are either centra or neural arches, suggesting that these elements had not become fully co-ossified yet while the animal was alive, which is a condition seen in somatically-mature dinosaurs. The only vertebra to be fully co-ossified in the specimen is the caudal vertebra, which indicates that the specimen, while young, was almost certainly not a hatchling.

== Classification ==
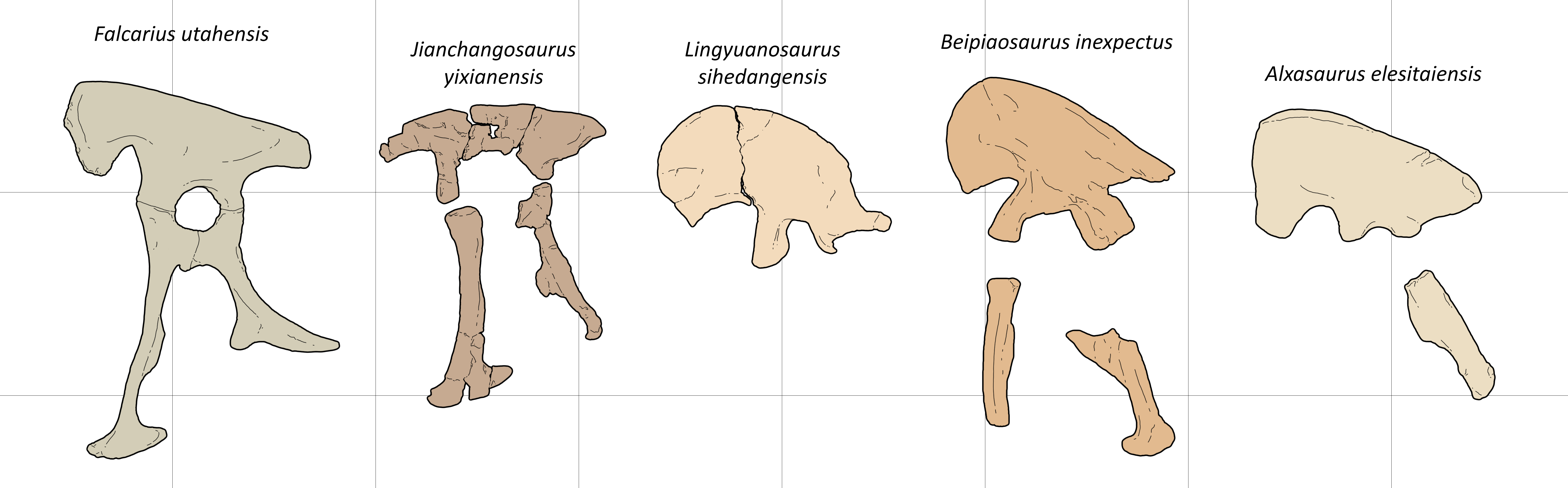
A diagram showing the hip morphology of several early-diverging therizinosaurs including Lingyuanosaurus in the center (not to scale)

In their description of Lingyuanosaurus, Yao and colleagues conducted a phylogenetic analysis based on the dataset used by Hans Dieter-Sues and Alexander Averianov in their description of the so-called "Bissekty therizinosaur" in 2016. Because of its incompleteness, they were only able to assign 45 character states to Lingyuanosaurus (out of a total of over 300), however their results using multiple methodologies and datasets confirmed the genus' place within Therizinosauria. An abbreviated version of the consensus tree found in their analysis is shown below.

- Therizinosauria
  - Falcarius
  - - Jianchangosaurus
    - Therizinosauroidea
      - Beipiaosaurus
      - - Lingyuanosaurus
        - - Alxasaurus
          - - Bissekty therizinosaur
            - Therizinosauridae

Lingyuanosaurus is believed to represent an evolutionary transition within therizinosaurs. Its ilium shows the strongly upturned iliac crest of later-diverging therizinosaurs, in contrast to the roughly contemporary Jianchangosaurus and Beipiaosaurus. It also has a relatively robust femur and a very deep acetabular process in comparison with those taxa and with Falcarius — which was believed to be more cursorial than later-diverging therizinosaurs. The relative shortness of the tibia relative to the femur of Lingyuanosaurus also suggests that it was not a very adept runner. However, the authors note that the evolution of these adaptations was probably not a linear process and may have involved multiple evolutions of each of these features. A later publication centered on the genus Beipiaosaurus remarked that the pre-acetabular blades on the ilium of Lingyuanosaurus are very well-developed and share a similar morphology with that of the derived genera Segnosaurus and Nanshiungosaurus.

== Paleobiology ==
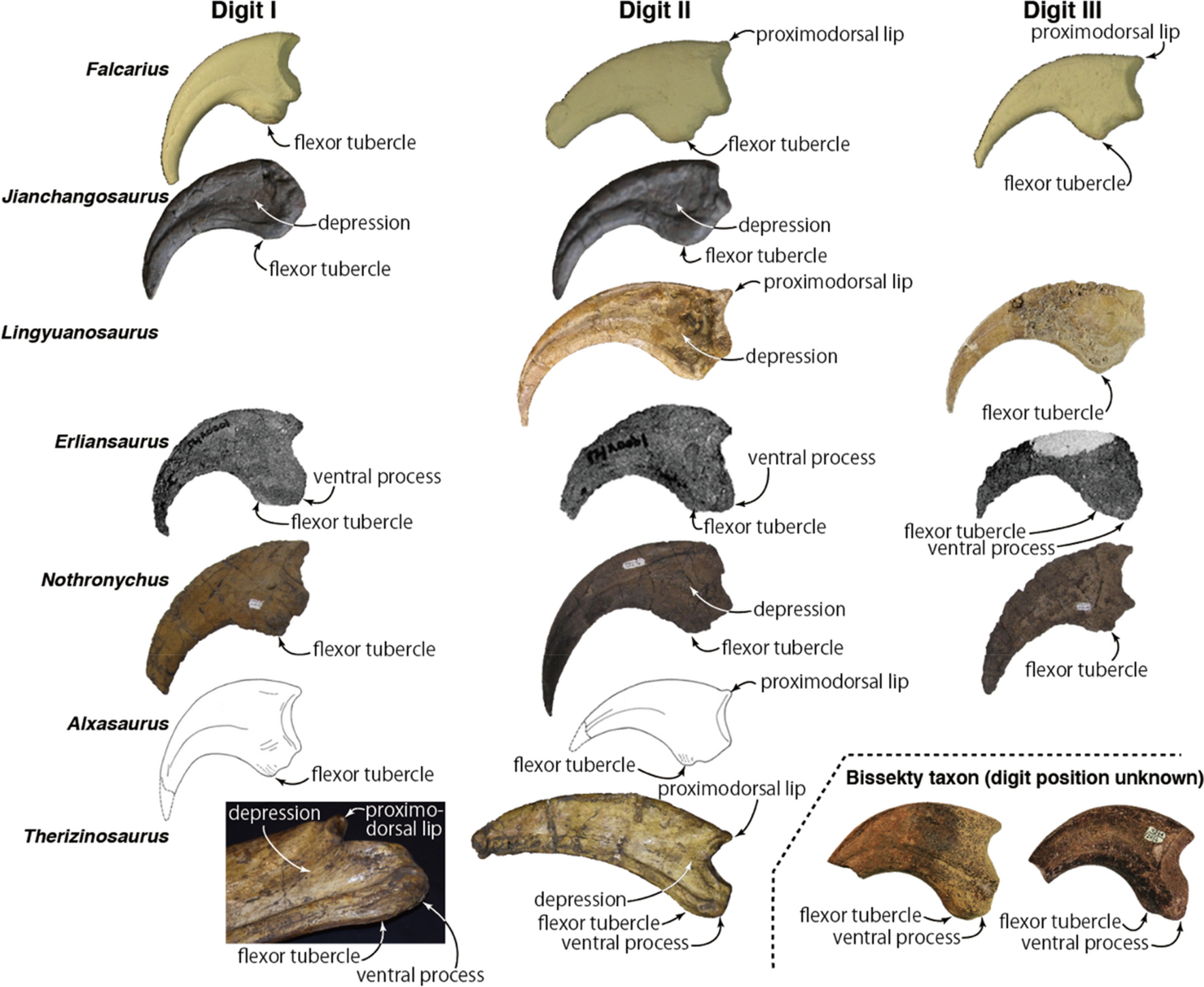
The hand claws of Lingyuanosaurus compared to those of other therizinosaurs

A study of the functional morphology of the claws of therizinosaurs and alvarezsauroids was published by Yoshitsugu Kobayashi and colleagues in their description of the taxon Paralitherizinosaurus. Their study, which examined the specific morphology of the claws on the first two digits of the fingers of all therizinosaurs from which this part of the anatomy is known. Their conclusion was that the hypertrophied manual claws of taxa like Therizinosaurus were not of much functional use due to the lack of a dorsal lip on the proximal part of the claw which could serve as a site for muscle attachment.

However, this "proximodorsal lip" is present in basal therizinosaur taxa such as Lingyuanosaurus and Falcarius. This may have permitted the claws of these taxa to be used to assist in feeding, digging, or locomotion, although the authors do not suggest any such specific uses for the claws in Lingyuanosaurus.

== Paleoecology ==
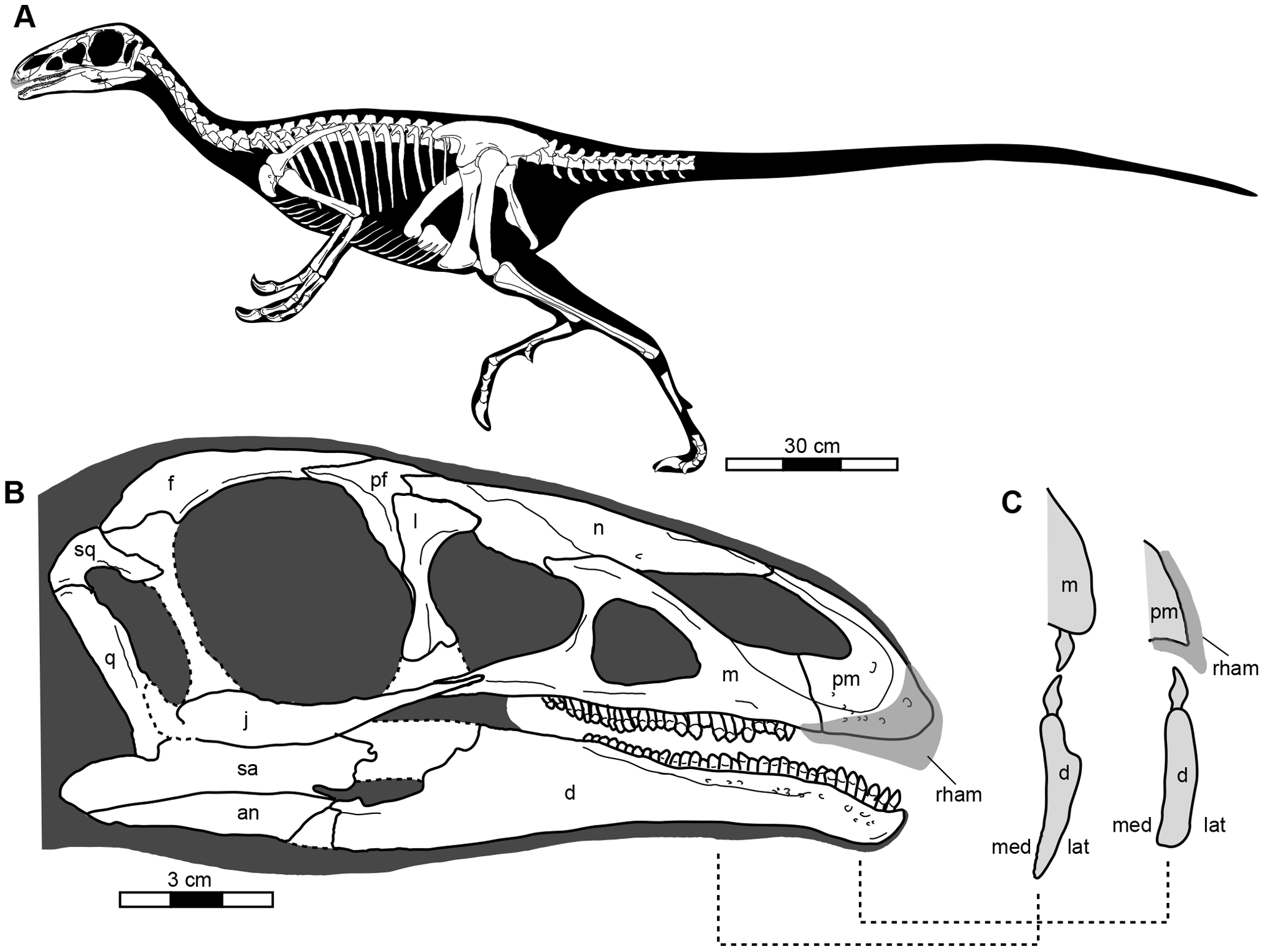
Skeletal restorationm of Jianchangosaurus, a close relative of Lingyuanosaurus, showing what its skull may have looked like

=== Diet ===
No remains of the skull of Lingyuanosaurus are known, so the dietary habits of the animal are not directly known. However, most known therizinosaurs are believed to have been herbivorous, so it is possible that Lingyuanosaurus was as well. This genus also possibly coexisted with the similarly sized therizinosaurs Beipiaosaurus and Jianchangosaurus, and it may have specialized to have unique dietary habits to avoid direct competition with these taxa. However, more detailed inferences can only be made if additional specimens are discovered.

=== Paleoenvironment ===
Studies suggest that the paleoenvironment of the Jehol Group involved seasonal climate fluctuations, and was warm and humid, punctuated by dry seasons, in which the environment became more arid. The average yearly temperature during the time of Lingyuanosaurus was 10 °C (50 °F), with relatively cold winters for the generally warm Mesozoic era. A study by Wu et al. 2013 concluded that orbital forcing, which is the effect on climate caused by shifts in the tilt of the Earth's axis and by the shape of the Earth's orbit, contributed to the climate fluctuations of this formation.

It is not known with certainty to which formation the Sihedang locality belongs. Some publications list it as being a part of the Yixian Formation, while others consider it to be part of the Jiufotang Formation.

=== Contemporary fauna ===
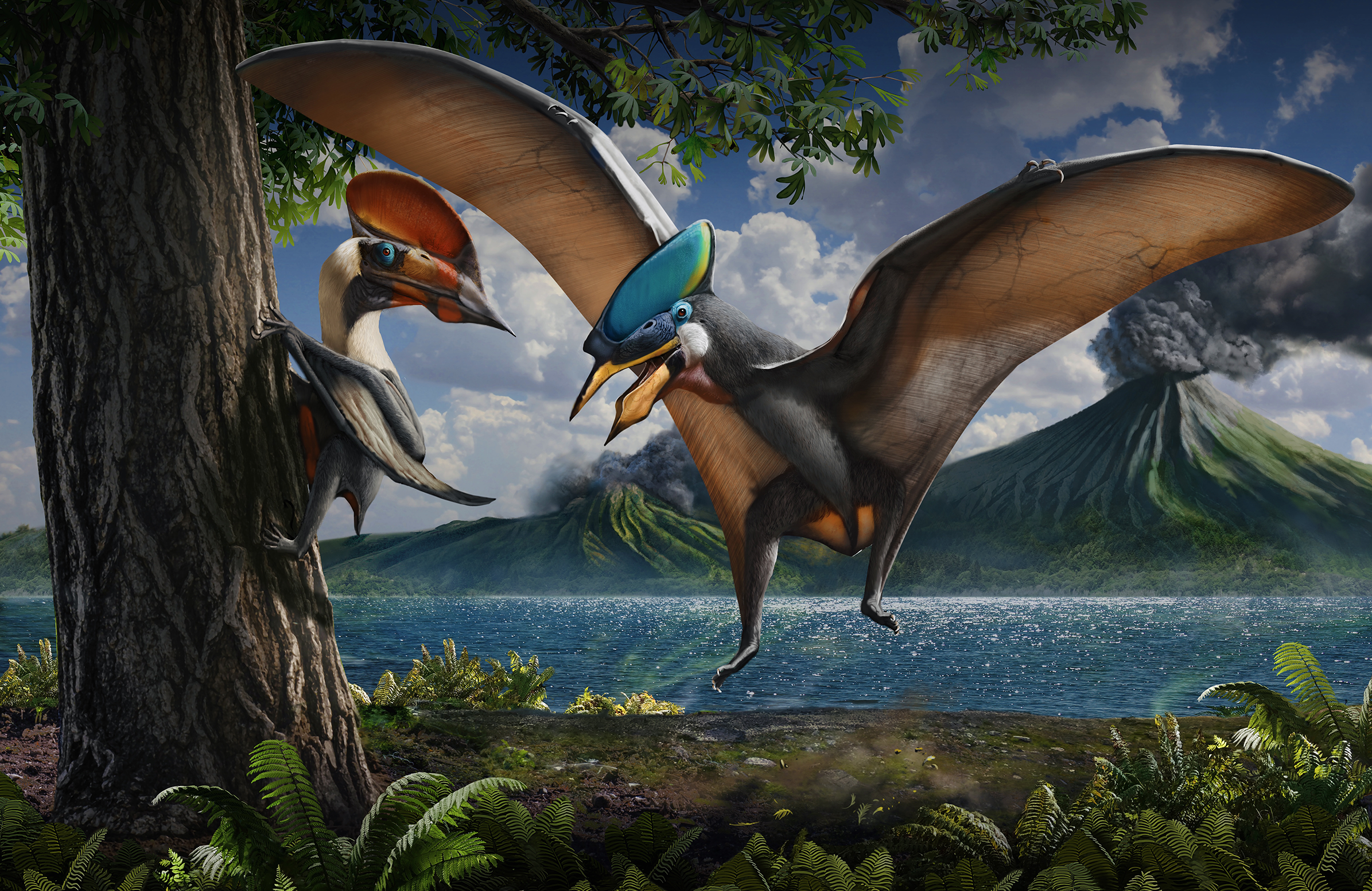
Two pterosaurs from the Jiufotang Formation depicted in their natural environment

The Sihedang locality preserves a variety of other fossil animals. Most of these fossils belong to other dinosaurs. Among these are the small dromaeosaurid Zhongjianosaurus, the confuciusornithiform Yangavis, the enantiornithine Monoenantiornis, and several ornithuromorphs such as Changzuiornis, Dingavis, Gansus, and Iteravis. A genus of turtle, Jeholochelys, is also known from this locality.

The Jehol biota generally preserves a wide variety of small-bodied animals. It is most famous for its well-preserved bird and other dinosaur fossils which preserve traces of feathers. Exemplars of this phenomenon include Confuciusornis, Psittacosaurus, Microraptor, Yutyrannus, and Sinosauropteryx. Other reptiles, including choristoderes, turtles, squamates, and a great diversity of pterosaurs have been found from this period in large numbers. The Jehol biota also preserves a variety of mammals, including Repenomamus – one of the largest known Mesozoic mammals – and Eomaia, which is believed to be related to the common ancestor of placentals and marsupials. The abundance of fish, insect, and mollusc fossils make the strata comprising the Jehol biota among the most productive fossil assemblages anywhere in the world.

== See also ==
- 2019 in paleontology
- List of Asian dinosaurs
- Timeline of therizinosaur research
