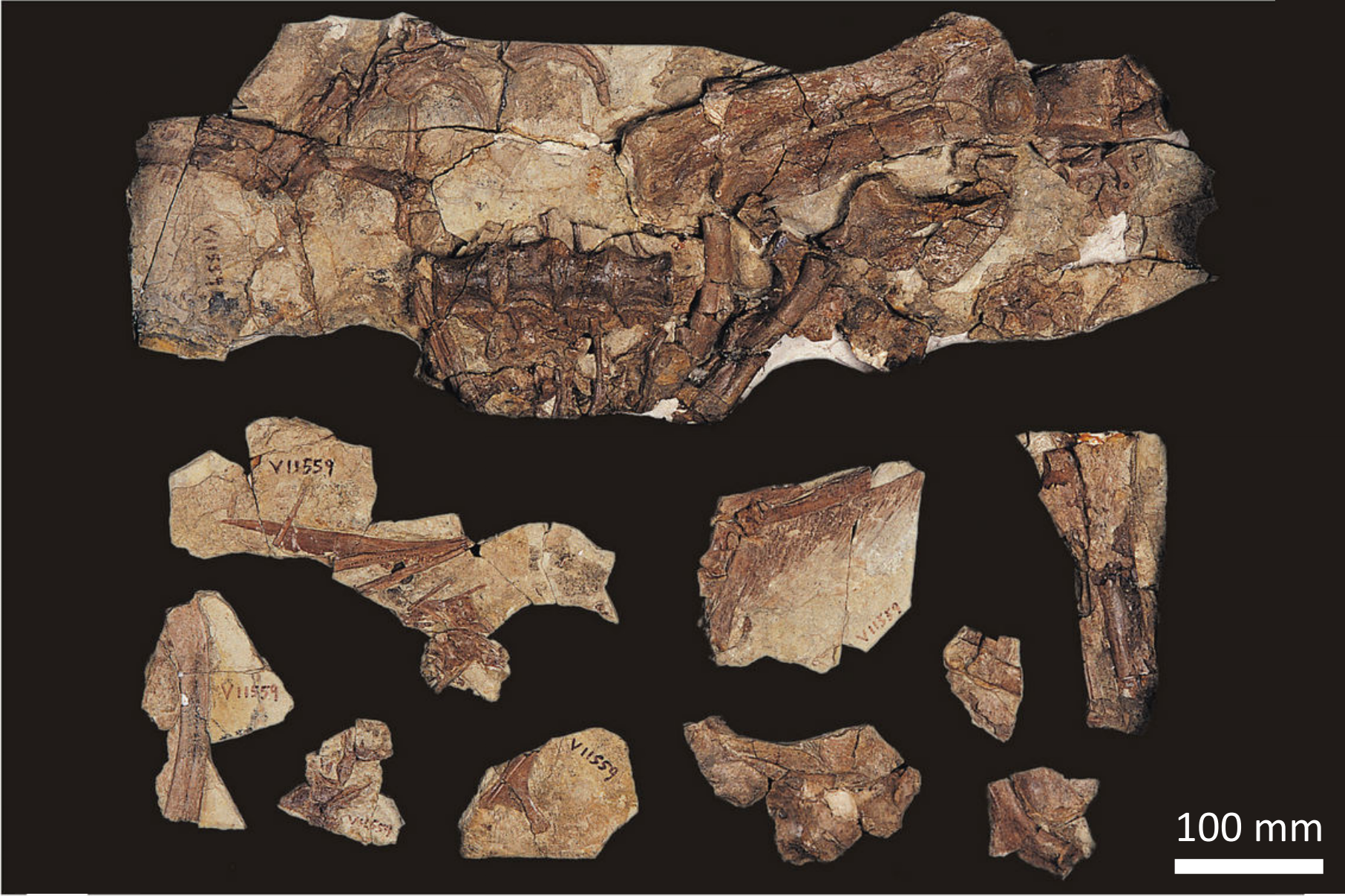
- Components of the holotype specimen (prior to the caudal vertebrae re-excavation)

Scientific classification
- Kingdom: Animalia
- Phylum: Chordata
- Class: Reptilia
- Clade: Dinosauria
- Clade: Saurischia
- Clade: Theropoda
- Clade: †Therizinosauria
- Superfamily: †Therizinosauroidea
- Genus: †Beipiaosaurus; Xu et al. 1999

Type species
- †Beipiaosaurus inexpectus Xu et al. 1999

Synonyms
- Jianchangosaurus? Pu et al. 2013

= Beipiaosaurus =

Beipiaosaurus Temporal range: Early Cretaceous (Barremian) 125.75–124.12 Ma

Extinct genus of dinosaurs

Beipiaosaurus /ˌbeɪpjaʊˈsɔːrəs/ is a genus of therizinosauroid theropod dinosaurs that lived in China during the Early Cretaceous in the Yixian Formation. The first remains were found in 1996 and formally described in 1999. Before the discovery of Yutyrannus, Beipiaosaurus were among the heaviest dinosaurs known from direct evidence to be feathered. Beipiaosaurus is known from three reported specimens. Numerous impressions of feather structures were preserved that allowed researchers to determine the feathering color which turned out to be brownish.

They were relatively small-sized therizinosaurs, measuring 2.2 m (7.2 ft) long and weighing about 27 kg (60 lb) in contrast to the advanced and giant Segnosaurus or Therizinosaurus. The necks of Beipiaosaurus were shorter than in most therizinosaurs, whose are characterized by elongated necks adapted for high-browsing. Also, their feet configuration differs from therizinosaurids, having a generic three-toed pes instead of four as seen in other members.

The exact classification of therizinosaurs had in the past been hotly debated, since their prosauropod-like teeth and body structure indicate that they were generally herbivorous, unlike typical theropods. Beipiaosaurus, being considered to be a primitive therizinosauroid, has features which suggest that all therizinosauroids, including the more derived Therizinosauridae, to be coelurosaurian theropods, not sauropodomorph or ornithischian relatives as once believed.

== History of discovery ==
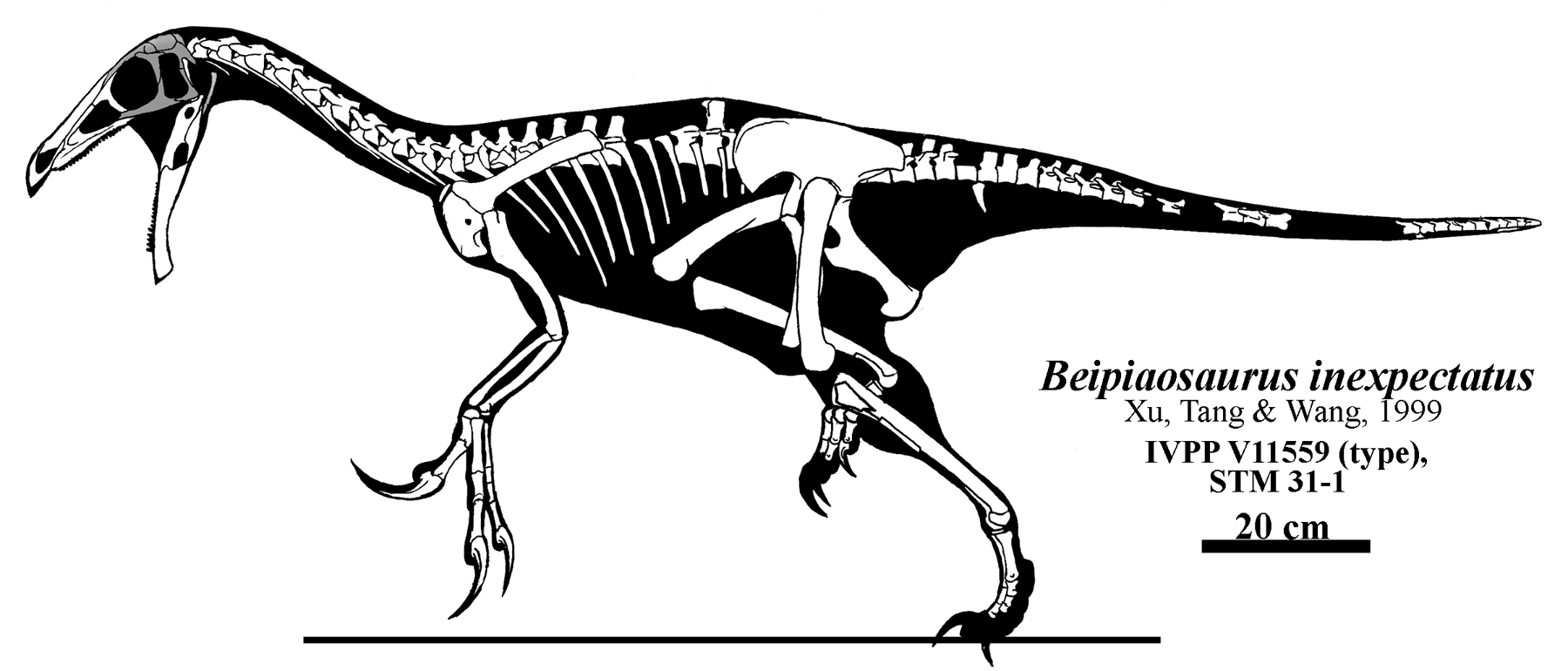
Skeletal composite of IVPP V11559 and STM 31-1

In 1996, a farmer, Li Yinxian discovered a partial skeleton of a theropod dinosaur near the village of Sihetun. The following year, it was confirmed to have come from the lower beds of the Yixian Formation and represented a single individual. On 27 May 1999, the discovery was announced in the academic journal Nature and the type species Beipiaosaurus inexpectus named and described by Xu Xing, Tang Zhilu and Wang Xiaolin. The generic name Beipiaosaurus translates as "Beipiao lizard" after Beipiao, a city in China near the location of its discovery. Beipiaosaurus is known from a single species, B. inexpectus, the specific name, meaning "unexpected" in Latin, referring to the "surprising features in these animals".

The holotype (type specimen) of Beipiaosaurus inexpectus, IVPP V11559, was recovered in the Jianshangou Beds of the Yixian Formation in Liaoning Province, China. The specimen was collected in sediment deposited during the Aptian stage of the Early Cretaceous period, approximately 125 million years ago. It is housed in the collection of the Institute of Vertebrate Paleontology and Paleoanthropology, in Beijing, China. It consists of a partial, sub-adult, skeleton that is largely disarticulated. A significant number of fossilized bones were recovered, including: cranial fragments, a mandible, teeth, three cervical vertebrae, four dorsal vertebrae, four dorsal ribs, two sacral vertebrae, twenty-five caudal vertebrae with a pygostyle, three chevrons, an incomplete furcula and scapula, both coracoids, both forelimbs, both ilia, an incomplete pubis, an incomplete ischium, a femur, both tibiae (one incomplete), an incomplete fibula, the astragalus and calcaneum, several tarsals, metatarsals, manual and pedal unguals, and skin impressions of the primitive plumage. The pelvic girdle and caudal vertebrae were discovered during a re-excavation of the fossil quarry where the first elements of the holotype were found. These rediscovered elements helped to complete the holotype specimen.

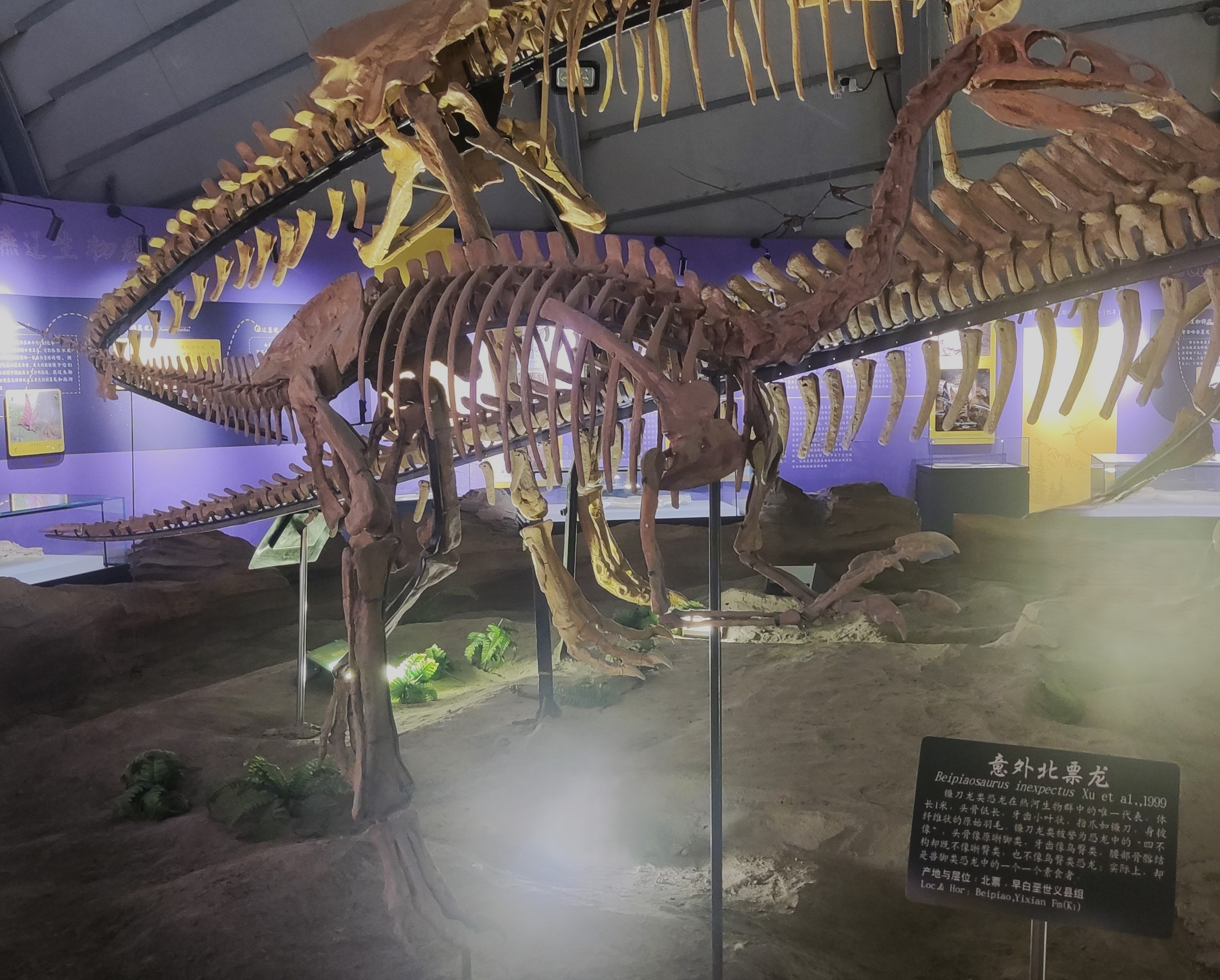
Reconstructed skeleton in Liaoning Palaeontological Museum

A second specimen, STM 31-1, a partial skeleton, was described by Xu et al. 2009, which preserves a significant covering of unique, elongated feathers. This specimen consists of a complete skull and mandible, a complete series of cervical vertebrae with several cervical ribs, some dorsal vertebrae with several dorsal ribs, both scapulae and coracoids, and much of the forelimbs. The rear of the skull of this specimen was badly crushed. Li et al. 2014 mentioned a third specimen labelled under the number BMNHC PH000911. This specimen hails from the Sihetun locality at the Beipiao County in Liaoning Province and compromises a partial individual preserving the skull (badly crushed), most of the vertebral column, both arms and other postcrania. Traces of feather integument were extensively found around the neck area.

== Description ==
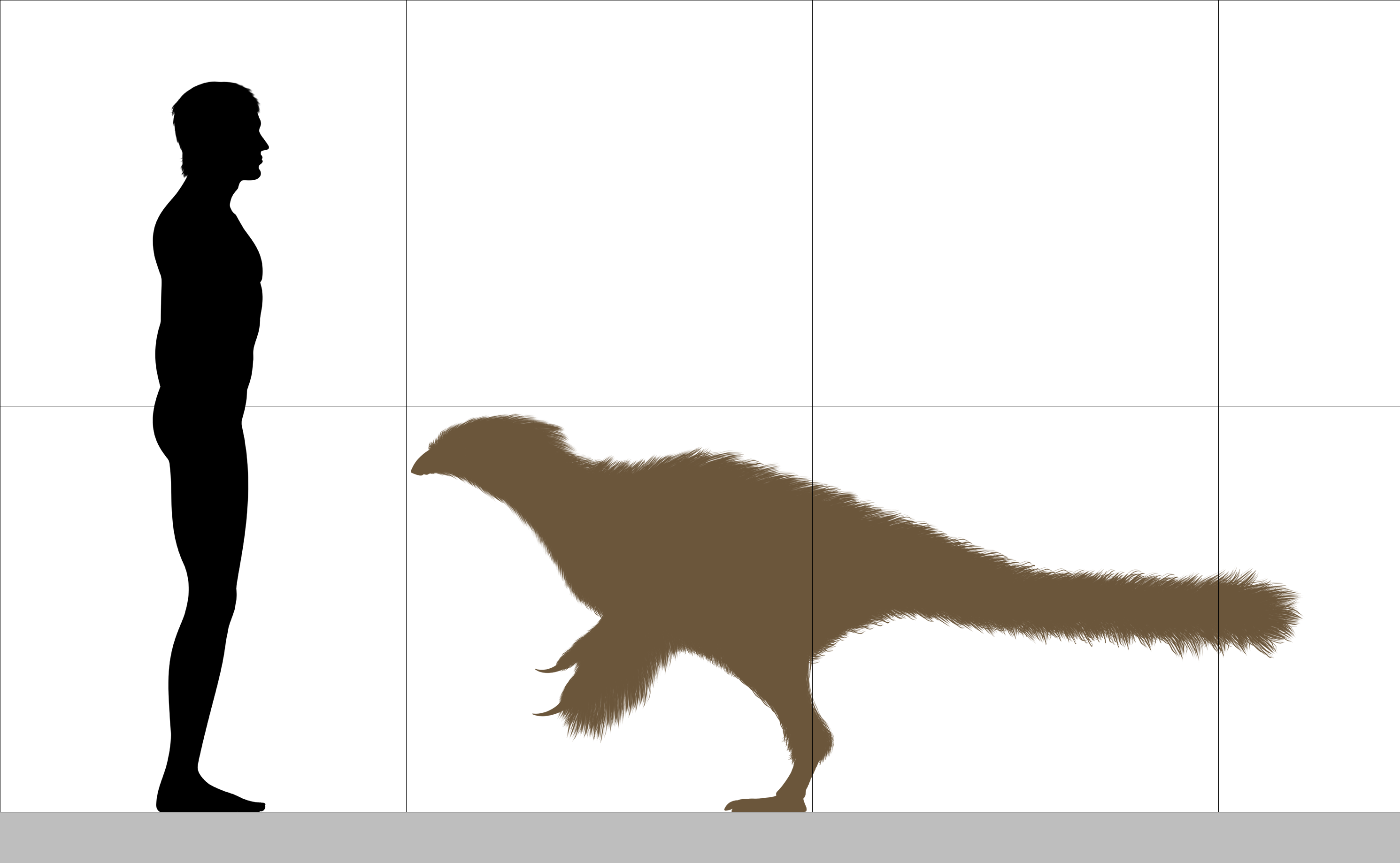
Size comparison

Beipiaosaurus was a small therizinosaur, with the largest specimen having an estimated length of 2.2 m (7.2 ft). In 2013, Lindsay E. Zanno and Peter Makovicky estimated its body mass at around 27 kg (60 lb), based on the length of its femur. In 2024, Gregory S. Paul estimated Beipiaosaurus' body length at 1.8 m (5.9 ft), and its body mass at around 50 kg (110 lb). More advanced therizinosaurids have four functional toes, but the feet of Beipiaosaurus still have reduced inner toes, showing that the derived therizinosaurid condition may have evolved from a three-toed therizinosauroid ancestor. The head was large relative to other therizinosaurs, with the lower jaw measuring about same length as the femur. The neck appears to be shorter compared to other therizinosaurs. In 2003 the pygostyle, consisting of the fused five last vertebrae of the tail, was described in greater detail, suggesting that the original function of the pygostyle was not linked with pennaceous feathers.

=== Skull and dentition ===
The skull of Beipiaosaurus was fairly large, proportionally, compared to other therizinosaurs. The premaxilla and maxilla are not known, and only one nasal is preserved, though it is not clear which side of the skull it belonged to. The transverse (side-to-side) arching of the nasal observed in other theropods was absent in Beipiaosaurus, though this may be taphonomic. The posterior (rear) half of the right frontal is preserved. The bone overall is inferred to have been subtriangular, as in other therizinosaurs. Unlike other therizinosaurs, the posterior portion is considerably broader than what is preserved of the anterior (front) portion; it is three times the width, as opposed to twice the width. It is flattened, as in Falcarius and Jianchangosaurus, as opposed to the domed shape seen in Erlikosaurus and most coelurosaurs. The parietals are both preserved. They were large and flat, and were separate bones, sutured along the midline; this is contrary to the condition in other therizinosaurs, like Erlikosaurus, where they were fused. The postorbital differs from that of Erlikosaurus in having a proportionally shorter frontal process a longer accessory medial (midline) process, and a more dorsal (higher) rugose area. The posterior half of Beipiaosaurus' skull (the braincase) is represented exclusively by the laterosphenoid and prootic bones.

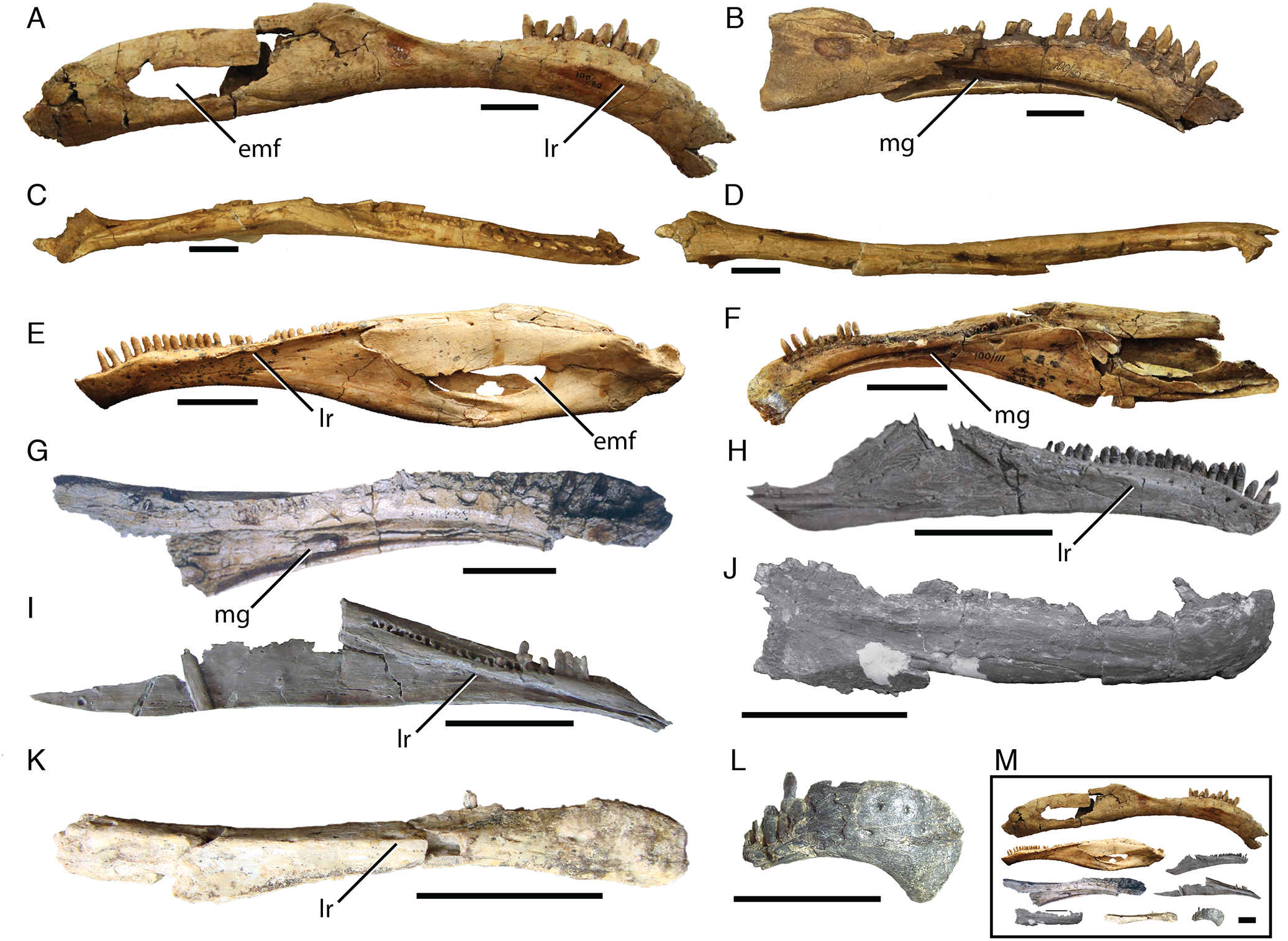
Comparison between the mandibles of therizinosaurs (I is that of Beipiaosaurus)

Beipiaosaurus' mandibles (lower jaws) are represented by a nearly complete right dentary, lacking the anterior and posterodorsal (top-rear) portions, the part of the left surangular, and part of the left angular. The dentary is around sixty-five percent as long as the femur, larger than that of any other therizinosaur. It is long and slender, subtriangular when seen from the side. At its lowest, the dentary is 5 mm (0.20 in), whereas at its highest, it is 20 mm (0.79 in). This size ratio is greater than that of most other therizinosaurs. The Meckelian groove is deep, narrow, and anterior, as opposed to the more dorsal one of Erlikosaurus. The left surangular forms most of the lateral surface of the mandible's posterior half, and bears two foramina on its lateral surface. The angular was very thin transversely, and formed the posteroventral (rear-bottom) and ventral (bottom) borders of the external mandibular fenestra.

Based on the amount of sockets in the dentary's alveolar margin, Beipiaosaurus likely had more than thirty-seven teeth in each dentary, similar to Alxasaurus and Eshanosaurus, but higher than most other therizinosaurs. The preserved teeth are fairly homodont (even in size and shape), and folidont (leaf-shaped with prominent denticles), though it is not clear whether those near the front of the dentary were enlarged and conidont (conical and with reduced denticles), as in other therizinosaurs. There denticles preserved are similar in size to those of Jianchangosaurus, with the carina of each crown bearing three denticles per millimetre. The tooth roots are slightly compressed mediolaterally. Resorption pits, containing replacement teeth, are associated with the medial surfaces of some functional teeth's roots, similar to Erlikosaurus.

=== Postcranial skeleton ===
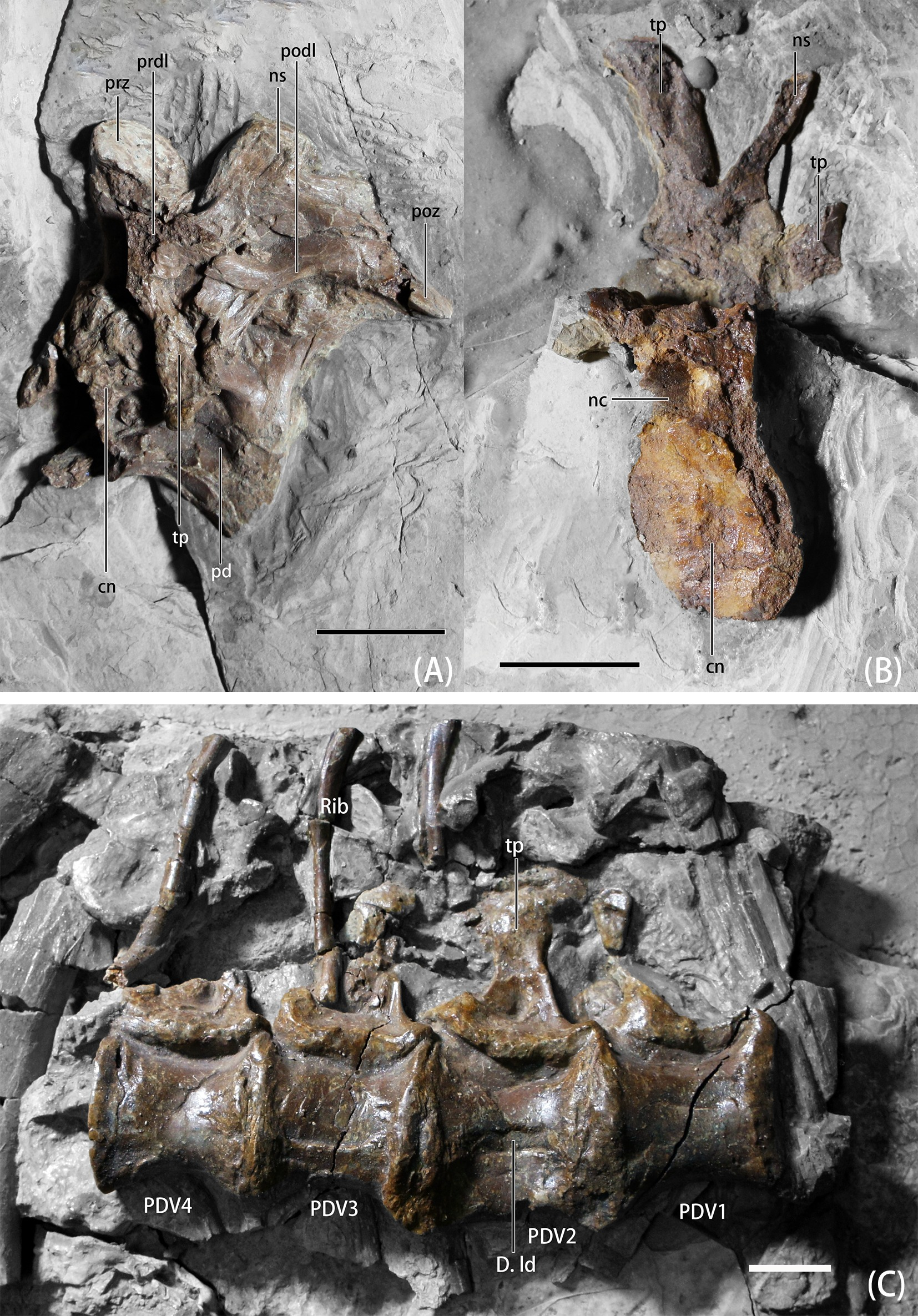
Dorsal vertebrae of the holotype of Beipiaosaurus

Four of Beipiaosaurus' cervical (neck) vertebrae are preserved, all of them incompletely. Since they are not elongated, they likely belong to the posterior portion of the cervical series. The centra of the cervical vertebrae were amphicoelous, meaning that they were concave on either end. Based on Jianchangosaurus and STM 31-1, nine or ten were likely present. The neural arch of each vertebra, as seen from above, is wider than the corresponding centrum. The neural spines of the cervical vertebrae were low and undeveloped, like those of many other therizinosaurs. The postzygapophyseal facets had rounded, ventrally oriented articular surfaces. The posterior cervical vertebrae had ribs that were not fully attached, though this may reflect the ontogenetic stage of the holotype. Six dorsal (back) vertebrae are preserved, four of them articulated and exposed in lateral view, and the other two isolated and exposed in anterolateral (exposing the front and side) and lateral views. In the case of the isolated one preserved in lateral view, the centrum was subrectangular in shape, with slightly concave ventral borders. The one preserved in anterolateral view, interpreted as the middle dorsal, had a gracile neural spine, almost as tall as the dorsoventral (top-to-bottom) height of the centrum, and upswept transverse processes. The last four dorsal vertebrae were fused. The number of sacral vertebrae in Beipiaosaurus is unknown. The caudal (tail) series is represented by a total of thirty preserved vertebrae, though more were certainly present. Most of them are transversely compressed. All of them are amphicoelous, lacking pneumatisation. Anteriorly, the neural spines are subequal in height to the centra, though decrease in height posteriorly. The vertebrae towards the tip of the caudal column were fused into a pygostyle.

The pectoral girdle of Beipiaosaurus is known from a right scapula, both coracoids, and a partial furcula. Like other basal therizinosaurs (and some more derived genera), the scapula and coracoid were separate, though this may be ontogenetic. The coracoids were subrectangular, similar to most other therizinosaurs, except for Jianchangosaurus. The scapular blade was long and slender, slightly widening distally (far from the body axis). The glenoid fossa was oriented posteroventrally (downwards and towards the back), like other basal therizinosaurs. As in many maniraptorans, the forelimbs were somewhat longer than the hind limbs. The humerus was relatively straight, like some later therizinosaurs. A pointed internal tuberosity sat in the proximal end of the humerus, separated from the humeral head by a depression. Based on other basal therizinosaurs, the size ratio between the humerus and the ulna was roughly seventy-seven to seventy-eight percent. The ulnar shaft is oval-shaped medially, flatening distally. The radius was slightly larger than the ulna, though was more gracile. Nine carpal (wrist) elements are preserved in Beipiaosaurus, though their identification is difficult, as their morphologies and positions do not line up. The manus (hand) is fairly complete. It was overall slender, as were the phalanges (digit bones; finger bones, in this case). The manual unguals (claws) were long and recurved, roughly equal in length to the phalanges they articulated to. Unlike in other therizinosaurs, the middle manual ungual was the largest.

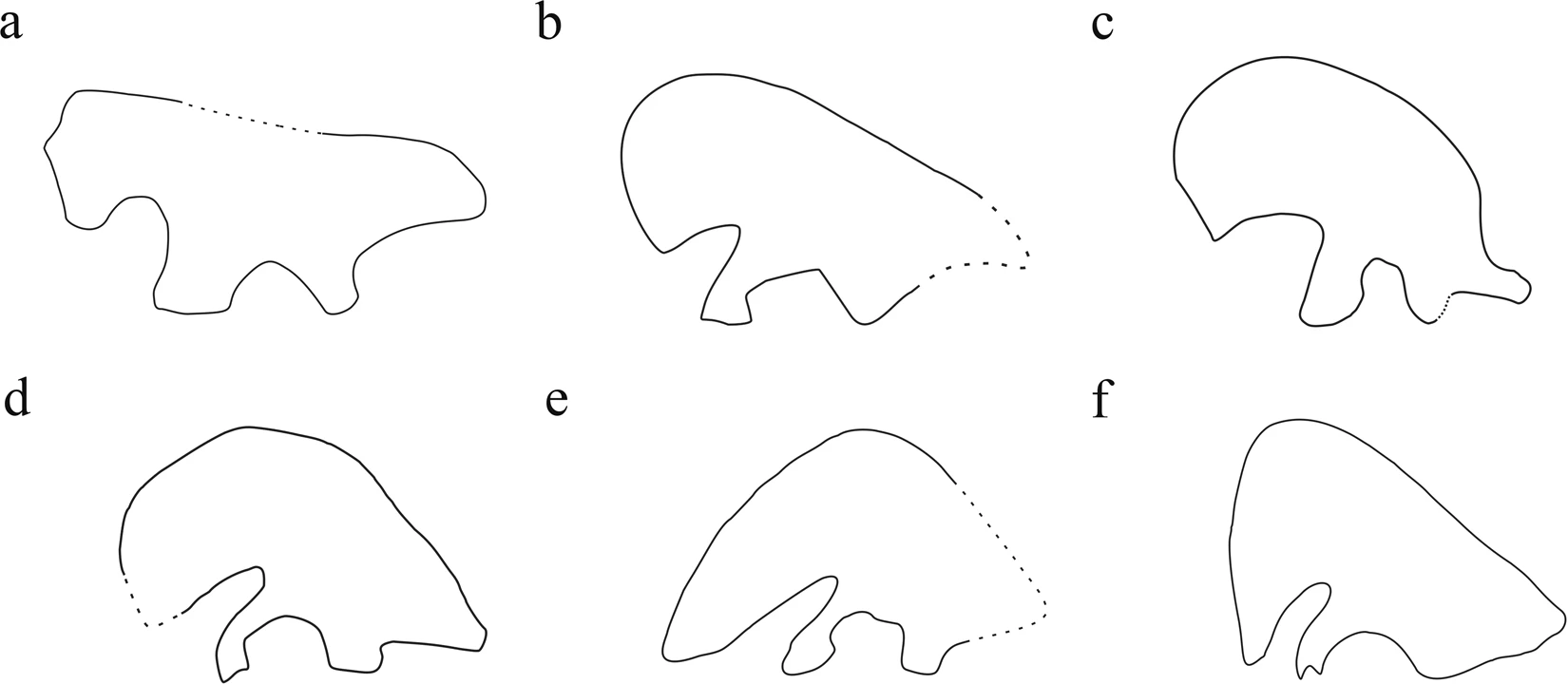
Schematic comparison of the ilium of Beipiaosaurus (in B) and other related therizinosaurs

The ilium of Beipiaosaurus was shaped like a parallelogram, similar to that of birds and dromaeosaurids, but unlike that of later therizinosaurs. The pubic peduncle (to which the pubis attached) was longer than the ischiadic peduncle (to which the ischium attached), unlike more basal taxa and like more derived taxa. The pubes lack the proximal and distant ends, while the right ischium preserves the proximal portion and the left ischium preserves the shaft and distal portions. The pubes and ischia were almost equal in size, with the pubes being slightly longer. The femur was gracile, intermediate between the curved femur of Falcarius and the straight femur of later therizinosaurs. The lesser trochanter was winglike, separated from the greater trochanter by a narrow, deep cleft. The fourth trochanter was thin and long. The tibia was gracile and slender, with a relatively straight shaft. The fibula was slenderer and more gracile still. Tarsal (foot) elements are known in the form of the right astragalus, calcaneum, and a distal tarsal. The metatarsus is relatively complete, though only portions are visible through the matrix. The first metatarsal was robust. It did not contact the tarsus, and articulated with the second metatarsal on the mid-shaft. This differs from the condition seen in later therizinosaurs, which were functionally tetradactyl. The pedal (foot) phalanges are disarticulated and broken, so identification is difficult.

=== Feathers and color ===
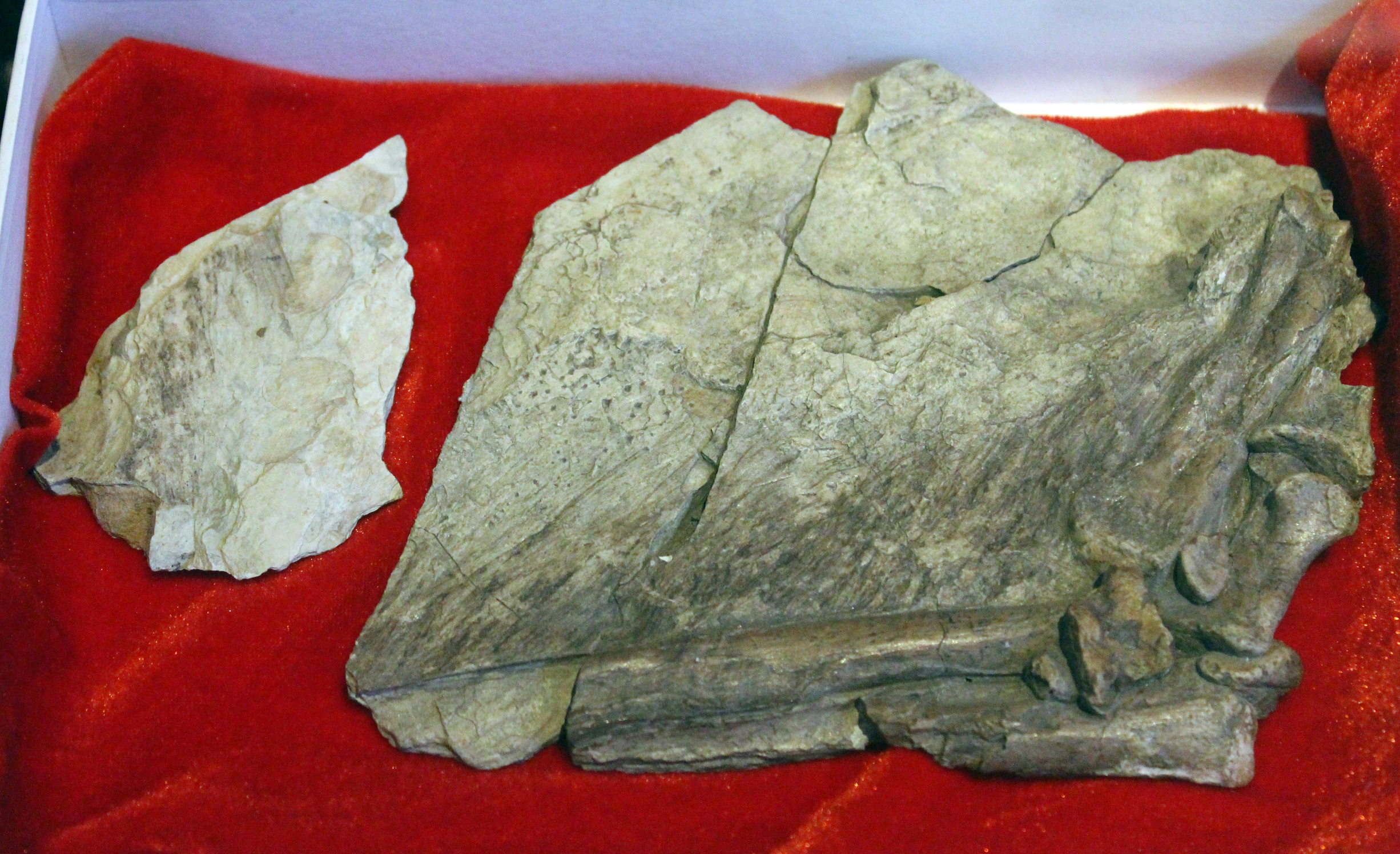
Feather impressions on the left arm from the holotype on display at the Paleozoological Museum of China

The first feather impressions were found in the holotype specimen, consisting of short, slender filamentous feathers on the left arm. These impressions indicated that the body was predominately covered by downy feather-like fibers, similar to those of Sinosauropteryx, but longer, and oriented perpendicular to the arm. Xu et al. 1999 suggested that these downy feathers represent an intermediate stage between Sinosauropteryx and more advanced birds (Avialae). The tail was also covered in feathers between 4–7 cm (1.6–2.8 in), consisting of parallel filaments with a width of 1.5 mm (0.15 cm), without a trace of pennaceous feathers or a tail fan, as indicated by the preserved pygostyle. A secondary coat of much longer, simpler feathers rose out of the down layer. These feathers, known as EBFFs (elongated broad filamentous feathers), were first described by Xu et al. 2009, based on specimen STM 31-1 consisting of the torso, head and neck. Xu and his team also found EBFFs in the tail of the holotype IVPP V11559, which were revealed by further preparation. Some of these were damaged during preparation.

Diagram illustrating feather evolution stages. Beipiaosaurus falls within stage 1 and stage 2

The EBFFs differ from other feather types in that they consist of a single, unbranched filament. Most other primitive feathered dinosaurs have down-like feathers made up of two or more filaments branching out from a common base or along a central shaft. The EBFFs of Beipiaosaurus are also much longer than other primitive feather types, measuring about 100–150 mm (10–15 cm) long, roughly half the length of the neck. In Sinosauropteryx, the longest feathers are only about 15% of the neck length. The EBFFs of Beipiaosaurus are also unusually broad, up to 3 mm (0.30 cm) wide in the holotype. The broadest feathers of Sinosauropteryx are only 0.2 mm (0.020 cm) wide, and only slightly wider in larger forms such as Dilong. Additionally, where most primitive feather types are circular in cross section, EBFFs appear to be oval-shaped. None of the preserved EBFFs were curved or bent beyond a broad arc in either specimen, indicating that they were fairly stiff. They were probably hollow, at least at the base.

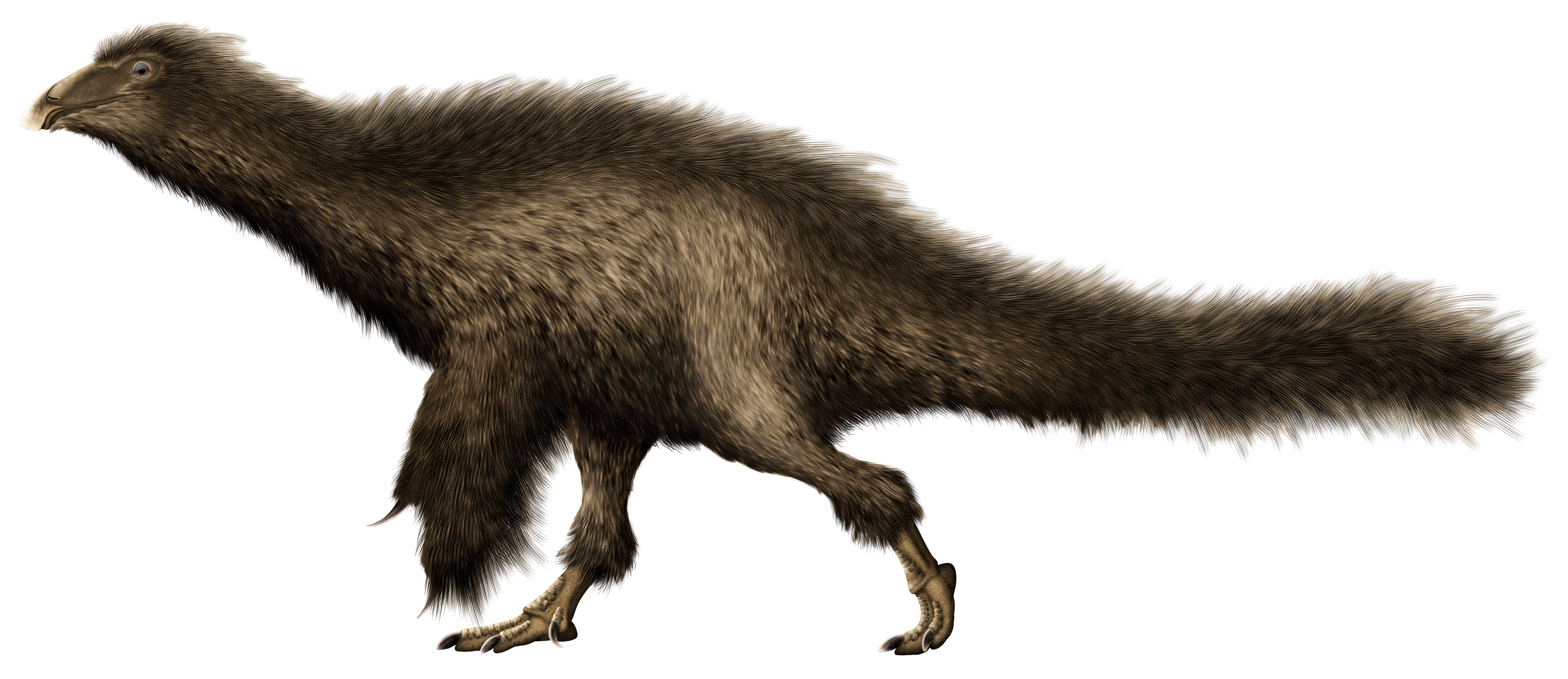
Life restoration

Li et al. 2014 compared the color and shape of the melanosomes in 181 extant animal specimens, 13 fossil specimens (including Beipiaosaurus) and previous data about the melanosome diversity using scanning electron microscopes. They found that color in dinosaurs seem to be slightly connected with their physiology. While some species of living reptiles (lizards or crocodiles, which are ectothermic) have less diversity in the shape of melanosomes and darker color ranges, some maniraptorans, birds and mammals (which are endothermic) have an increased diversity of melanosome shapes and more vivid colors. The examined specimen of Beipaosaurus, BMNHC PH000911, preserves feather impressions which are located in the neck area. These are filamentous/sparse in structure and the sampled melanosomes were sphere-shaped and inferred to have a brownish colouration like those in modern reptiles which fall within the range of dark brownish colourations.

Jianchangosaurus is another primitive therizinosaur taxon known from the same formation that was found with impressions of a series of filamentous and unbranched feathers in its holotype specimen. Only the distal ends of the feather impressions are visible and based on their morphology the feathers are considered to be EBFFs, bearing resemblance to those found along the specimens of Beipiaosaurus. These findings suggest that they might have been used for visual display and were common among early therizinosaurs.

== Classification ==
The affinities of therizinosaurs were originally obscure and often problematic, giving rise to taxonomic debate since they feature similar adaptations to the unrelated sauropodomorphs and ornithischians. The description of Beipiaosaurus helped to assemble the definitive placement of therizinosaurs within the Theropoda, especially as maniraptorans thanks to the numerous theropod features and irrefutable feather impressions in the holotype. Beipiaosaurus was first assigned to the Therizinosauroidea, in a very primitive position by Xu et al. 1999. All subsequent phylogenetic analyses have confirmed this assignment. According to the definition by Paul Sereno of this group, Beipiaosaurus is even by definition the basal most member. Lindsay E. Zanno noted that Beipiaosaurus shares a sister-taxon relationship with Falcarius, a taxon that includes all the more derived therizinosauroids, however, it appears to be that Falcarius is more primitive than Beipiaosaurus.

The cladogram below is the result of the performed phylogenetic analysis of the Therizinosauria by Hartman et al. 2019 which is largely based on the data provided by the revision of Zanno in 2010. Beipiaosaurus occupied a more derived position than Falcarius, as previously indicated by Zanno:

- Therizinosauria
  - Falcarius
  - - Jianchangosaurus
    - Therizinosauroidea
      - - Beipiaosaurus
        - - "Chilantaisaurus" zheziangensis
          - Enigmosaurus
          - Alxasaurus
          - Therizinosauridae

Cau (2024) suggested that the contemporary Jianchangosaurus represents a junior synonym of Beipiaosaurus, since the diagnosis distinguishing the taxa was based on ontogenetically variable characters. As such, Jianchangosaurus would represent a less mature individual of Beipiaosaurus. In their 2026 description of the contemporary related genus Kayrasaurus, Liao and colleagues supported the validity and distinction of all four Yixian therizinosaurs, suggesting that Beipiaosaurus and Kayrasaurus occupied a less cursorial niche than Jianchangosaurus and Lingyuanosaurus, the latter being better adapted to running.

== Paleobiology ==
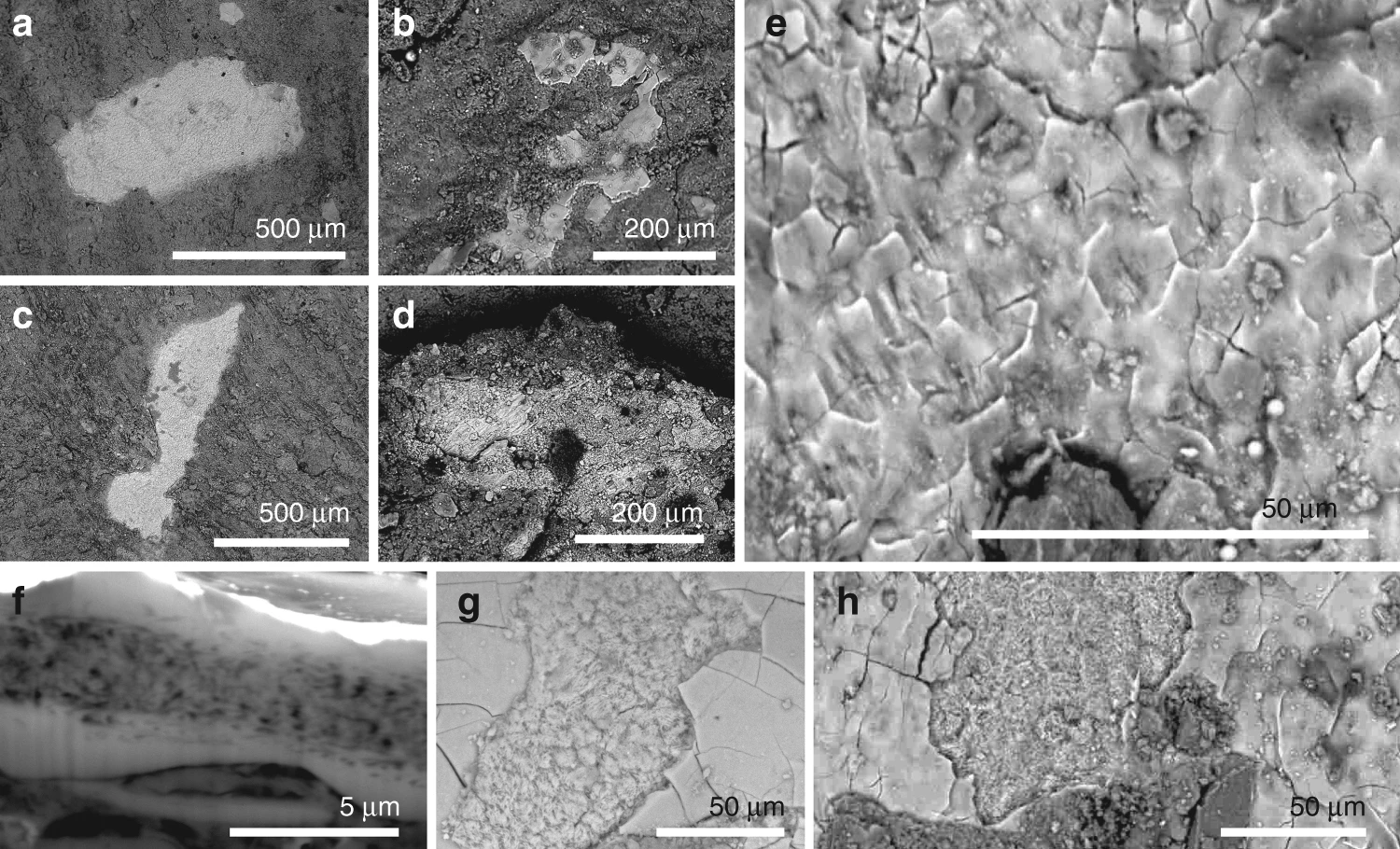
Phosphatised soft tissues in non-avian maniraptoran dinosaurs and a basal bird. Beipiaosaurus in b and g

In 2018, McNamara and colleagues discovered the fossilised remains of skin flakes from numerous feathered dinosaurs from the Jehol Biota and some bird species using scanning electron microscope on the preserved feather impressions. The analyzed fossil taxa consisted of Confuciusornis, Beipiaosaurus, Microraptor and Sinornithosaurus. For Beipiaosaurus, the specimen STM 31-1 was analyzed.

By exposing the skin flakes under an electron microscope they found corneocytes, which are cells rich in keratin. In order to make comparisons with extant feathered dinosaurs, they analyzed several bird taxa such as Anas, Lonchura and Taeniopygia and found similar cell structures, but the fossil dinosaur corneocytes were more densely packed with keratin and lacking lipids (fat), suggesting that Beipiaosaurus and co-analyzed taxa did not get as warm as modern birds, mainly because they were ground-dwelling animals not able to fly. In the case of the primitive birds Confuciusornis, they could not fly at all for long periods. In modern birds these structures, with the addition of fats, help to regulate body temperature during active flight.

In addition, the identified corneocytes structures seem to indicate that non-avian dinosaurs had a similar way of shedding skin to extant birds and mammals. Unlike many reptiles alive today (lizards or snakes) which shed their skin as a single piece or as several large pieces, Beipiaosaurus and other non-avian dinosaurs shed their skin as dandruff, like Confuciusornis, modern birds or mammals.

== Paleoecology ==
Studies suggest that the paleoenvironment of the Yixian Formation involved seasonal climate fluctuations, and was warm and humid, punctuated by dry seasons, in which the environment became more arid. The average yearly temperature during the time of Beipiaosaurus was 10 °C (50 °F), with relatively cold winters for the generally warm Mesozoic era. A study by Wu et al. 2013 concluded that orbital forcing, which is the effect on climate caused by shifts in the tilt of the Earth's axis and by the shape of the Earth's orbit, contributed to the climate fluctuations of this formation.

The Yixian Formation is well known for the great diversity of its well-preserved specimens, including numerous dinosaurs, such as the tyrannosauroids Dilong and Yutyrannus, the dromaeosaurids Sinornithosaurus, oviraptorosaurs including Caudipteryx, compsognathids including Sinocalliopteryx, avialans including Confuciusornis and some non-theropod dinosaurs, such as Psittacosaurus and Dongbeititan.

Other contemporaries of Beipiaosaurus included ancient shrimp, snails and slugs, as well as a diverse group of insects, and fish such as Lycoptera. Most vertebrates in this formation showed a tendency to become arboreal, including many tree-dwelling birds, and climbing mammals and lizards. The flora was dominated by conifers related to modern species that are found mainly in subtropical and temperate upland forests, with the presence of ferns, cycads, and horsetails.

== See also ==
- Dinosaur coloration
- Falcarius
- Timeline of therizinosaur research
