= Coracoid tubercle =

The coracoid tubercle is an anatomical feature of the pectoral skeleton in archosaurs, including maniraptoran dinosaurs. It is sometimes called the biceps tubercle. It is also sometimes called the coracoid tuber or biceps tuber.

The coracoid tubercle is a prominent area on the anterior surface of the coracoid, just ventral to the shoulder socket (glenoid). The coracoid tubercle forms the pointed portion in those coracoids described as "flexed". It was previously called the biceps tubercle because it was thought to be the origin of the M.biceps muscle. Makovicky & Sues (1998) followed Alick Walker (1990) in asserting that it is, instead, probably the origin of the M. coracobrachialis muscle. Thus, they preferred the term "coracoid tubercle". Norell and Makovicky (1999) followed this precedent and credited Osmolska (1972) with their precise definition of "coracoid tubercle".
