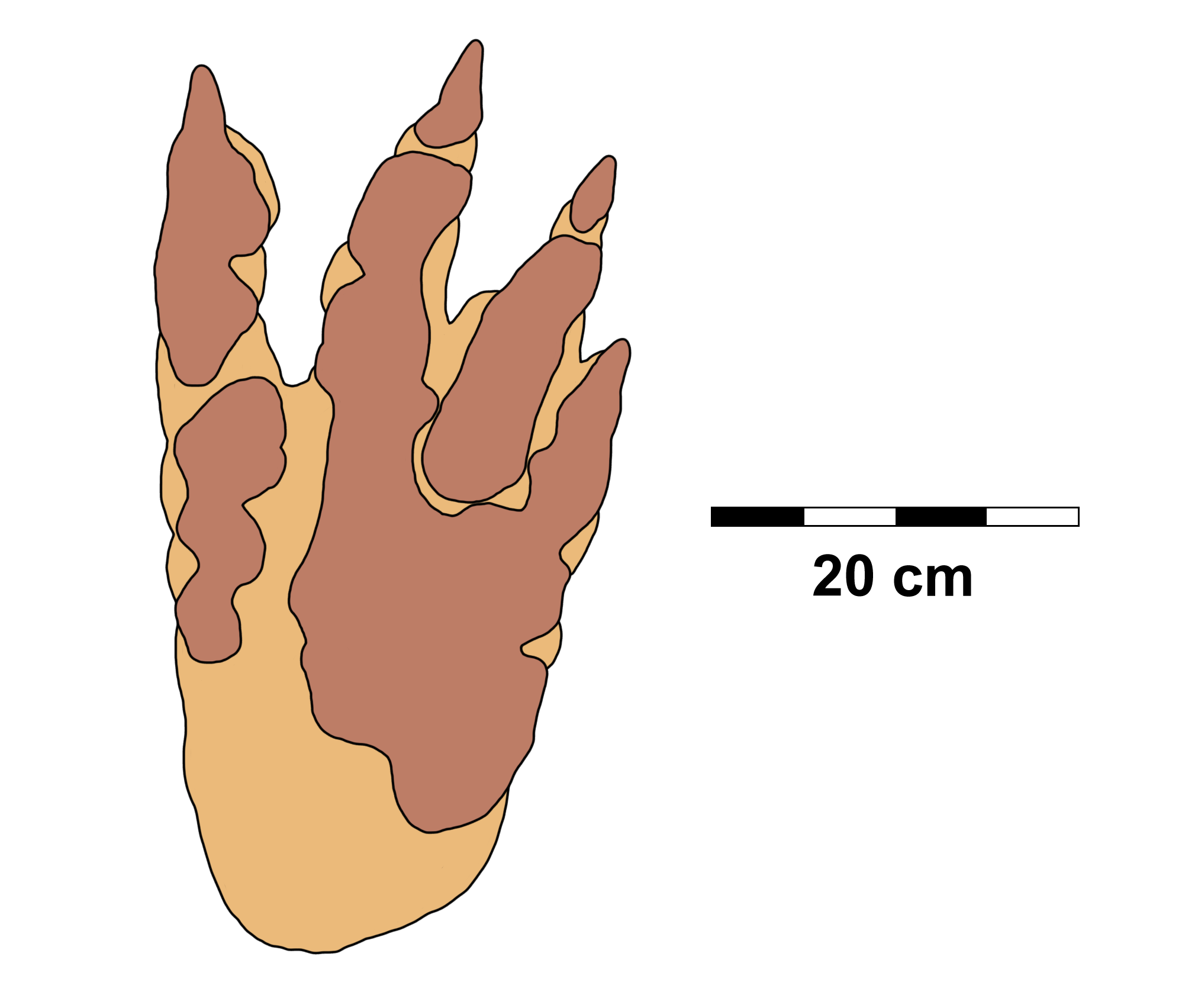
- Left footprint from Tajikistan

Trace fossil classification
- Ichnogenus: †Macropodosaurus; Zakharov, 1964

Type ichnospecies
- †Macropodosaurus gravis Zakharov, 1964

= Macropodosaurus =

Macropodosaurus Temporal range: Late Cretaceous, ~100.5–66.0 Ma

Therizinosaurid ichnogenus from the Late Cretaceous period

Macropodosaurus is an ichnogenus of therizinosaurid footprints from the Late Cretaceous of Asia, North America and Poland. The ichnogenus is currently monotypic only including the type ichnospecies M. gravis, described and named in 1964.

When first described, Macropodosaurus tracks were inferred to have been made by a bipedal, yet indeterminate type of dinosaur. In 2006 it was re-evaluated and concluded to represent footprints of therizinosaurid dinosaurs based on comparisons with skeletal feet remains.

== History of discovery ==
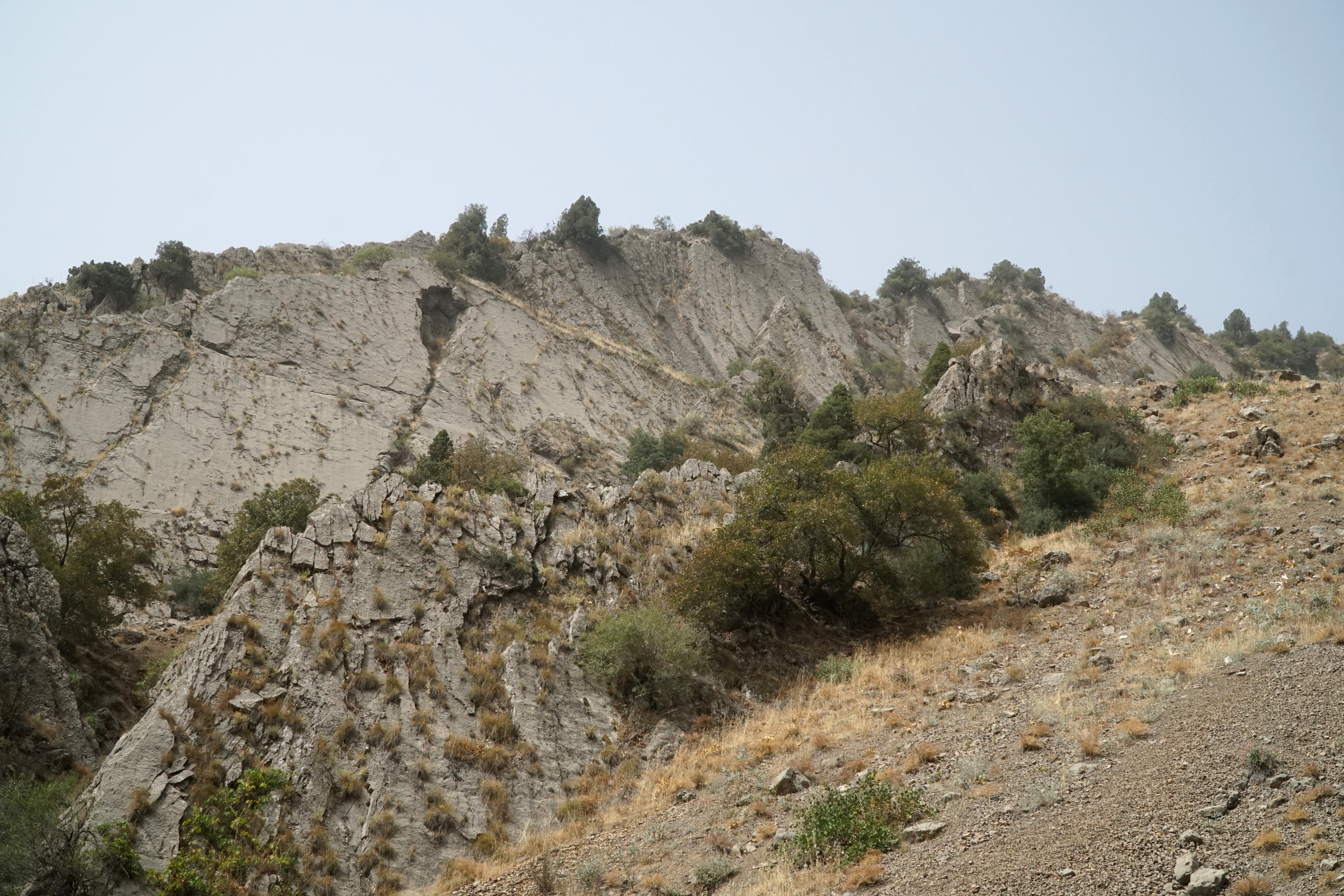
Shirkent valley, the type locality of Macropodosaurus tracks

In 1963, Russian geologist F.H. Khakimov discovered unusual bipedal trackways at the Shirkent-1 locality of the Shirabad Formation in the Shirkent River valley (Tajikistan). The material consisted of a series of four-toed footprints found in Cenomanian slabs of hard clayey limestone. They later became the holotype material for the new ichnogenus and ichnospecies Macropodosaurus gravis, described and named in 1964 by Sergey A. Zakharov. He stated that they were made by a bipedal four-toed dinosaur and not a quadrupedal animal.

More later, in 2006 Andrey G. Sennikov re-examined these footprints and concluded that a therizinosaurid dinosaur likely made those tracks. He compared Macropodosaurus with the feet of Erlikosaurus and Therizinosaurus noting that in a plantigrade position they match the morphology of the tracks. Sennikov considered these tracks to be more associated with therizinosaurids and proposed a plantigrade stance for them.

In 2008 two Macropodosaurus tracks were discovered in sediments of the Ferron Formation, Utah, in a locality known as the Muddy Creek Canyon. Although these have been in knowledge since their discovery, in 2013 they were described by Gerard Gierlinski and Martin Lockley.

Macropodosaurus has also been discovered in the Maastrichtian strata of Poland in 2007. This footprint is reminiscent of the tracks described by Zakharov and was assigned to Macropodosaurus sp. This discovery may indicate the ancient presence of therizinosaurids in Europe.

In 2017 Masrour with colleagues reported more Macropodosaurus footprints in what is now Morocco, further expanding the paleobiogeographical range of therizinosaurids.

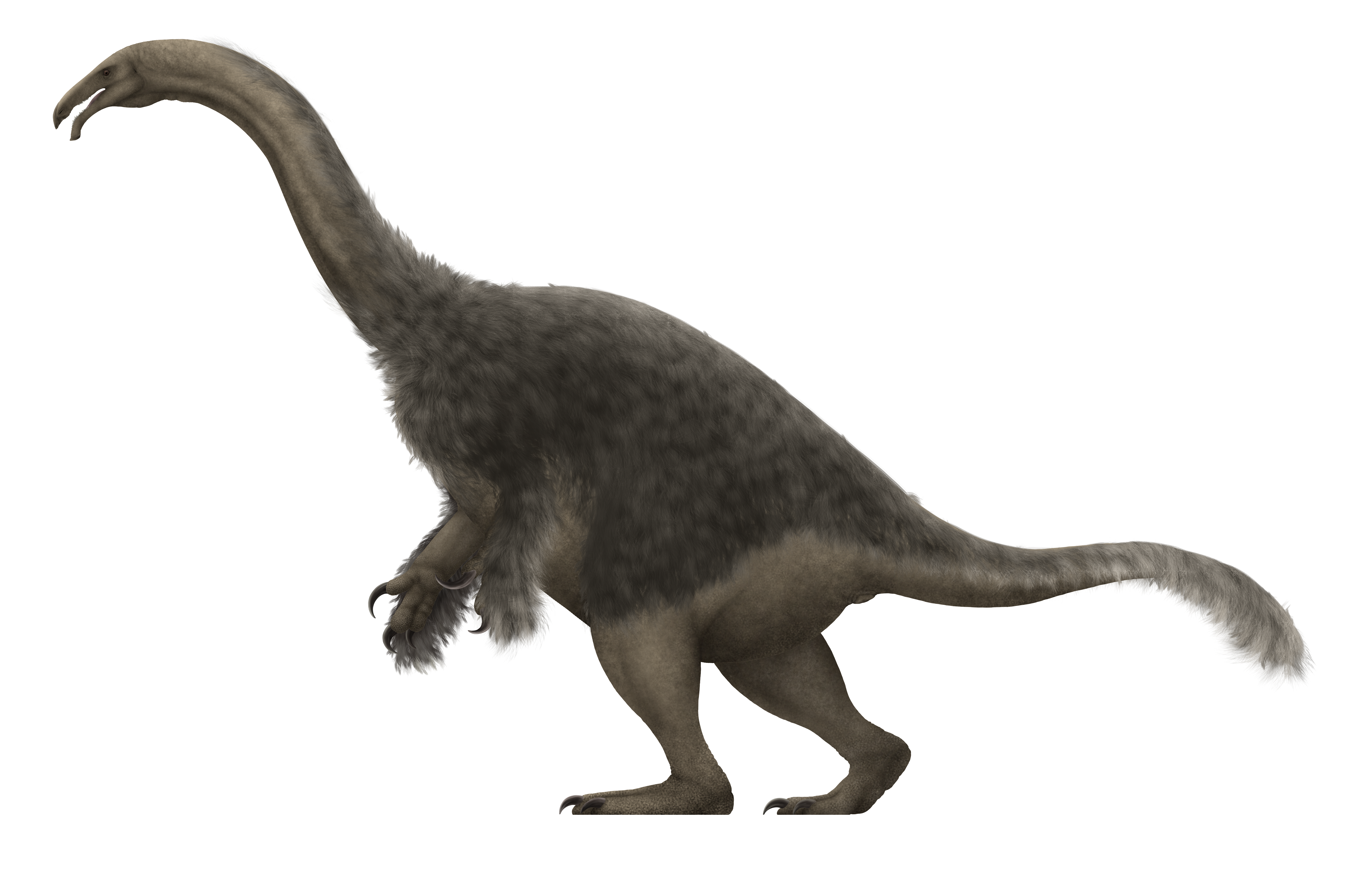
Macropodosaurus tracks are proposed to have been produced by a therizinosaurid dinosaur, here Segnosaurus. Note plantigrade feet

Sennikov re-analyzed Macropodosaurus and the overall foot anatomy of therizinosaurids, concluding that this group had a plantigrade stance. While ancestral therizinosaurs had a gracile and digitigrade stance, therizinosaurids evolved a robust, ponderous body plan and plantigradism.

== Description ==
Macropodosaurus tracks are relatively large, having average dimensions of 50 cm (500 mm) long and 30 cm (300 mm) wide. Individually, they are narrow/long, and have four distinct digits which are set closely together. Each digit ends in moderately pronounced claws. Long trackways are narrow, running nearly parallel to each other at a distance of ~1 m (3.3 ft). Some Macropodosaurus tracks are reported with lengths of ~56–57 cm (560–570 mm), but this was most likely caused by shifting movement of the animal in loose terrain. Molina-Pérez and Larramendi in 2016 proposed an animal around 4.4–5 m (14–16 ft) and 510–806 kg (1,124–1,777 lb) for a 56 cm (560 mm) long Macropodosaurus footprint.

== See also ==
- List of dinosaur ichnogenera
- Timeline of therizinosaur research
