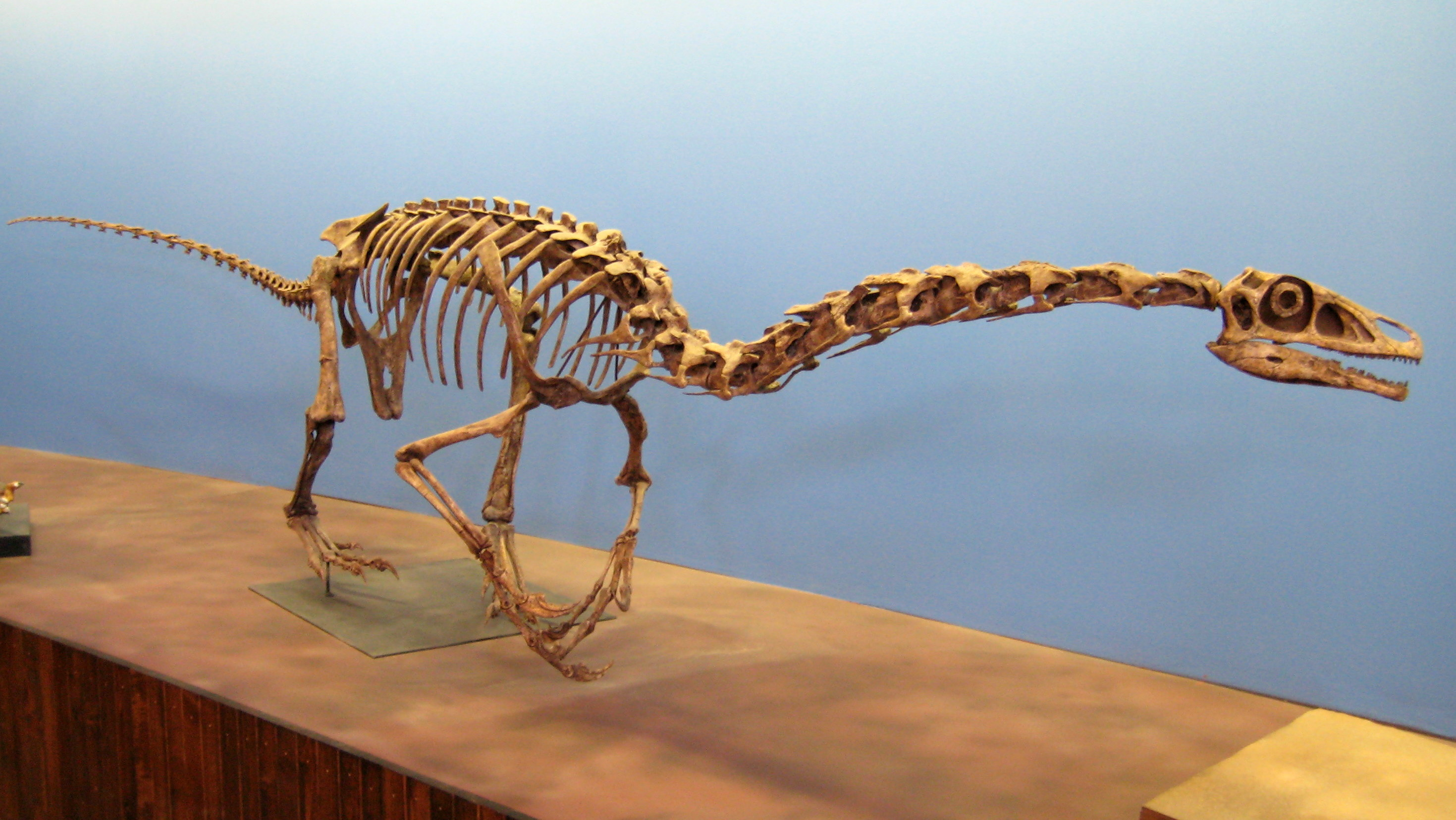
- Reconstructed skeleton of F. utahensis, Natural History Museum of Utah

Scientific classification
- Kingdom: Animalia
- Phylum: Chordata
- Class: Reptilia
- Clade: Dinosauria
- Clade: Saurischia
- Clade: Theropoda
- Clade: Maniraptora
- Clade: †Therizinosauria
- Genus: †Falcarius; Kirkland et al., 2005

Type species
- †Falcarius utahensis Kirkland et al., 2005

Other species
- †Falcarius suarezarum (Senter et al., 2010) Freimuth et al., 2026

Synonyms
- Geminiraptor Senter et al., 2010

= Falcarius =

Falcarius Temporal range: Early Cretaceous (Berriasian–Valanginian), ~139–134.6 Ma

Genus of theropod dinosaur

Falcarius (meaning "sickle cutter") is a genus of primitive therizinosaurian theropod dinosaurs that lived during the Early Cretaceous period in what is now North America. Its remains were first collected in the Cedar Mountain Formation in 1999, with subsequent findings made during the 2000s. The genus contains two species. The type species, Falcarius utahensis, was named in 2005 and is known from multiple specimens ranging from immature to fully-grown individuals. The second species, Falcarius suarezarum, was first placed in the distinct genus Geminiraptor in 2010 and identified as a troodontid based on a single jaw bone. Later research based on many more fossils from that site indicated the bones instead belong to a therizinosaur very similar to F. utahensis.

Falcarius was a 4 m (13 ft) long bipedal herbivore with a small head and an elongated neck and tail. Unlike advanced therizinosaurs, Falcarius had a propubic pelvis and three-toed feet with a reduced hallux (first digit).

Falcarius is the basalmost known definitive therizinosaurian genus, and has been considered a transitional form connecting the typical theropod body plan to the unusual morphology of Therizinosauridae. Its description in 2005, following that of the basal therizinosauroid Beipiaosaurus from the Early Cretaceous of China in 1999, helped clarify the early evolution of the Therizinosauria and its relationships within the larger group of Theropoda.

== History of discovery ==
=== Falcarius utahensis ===
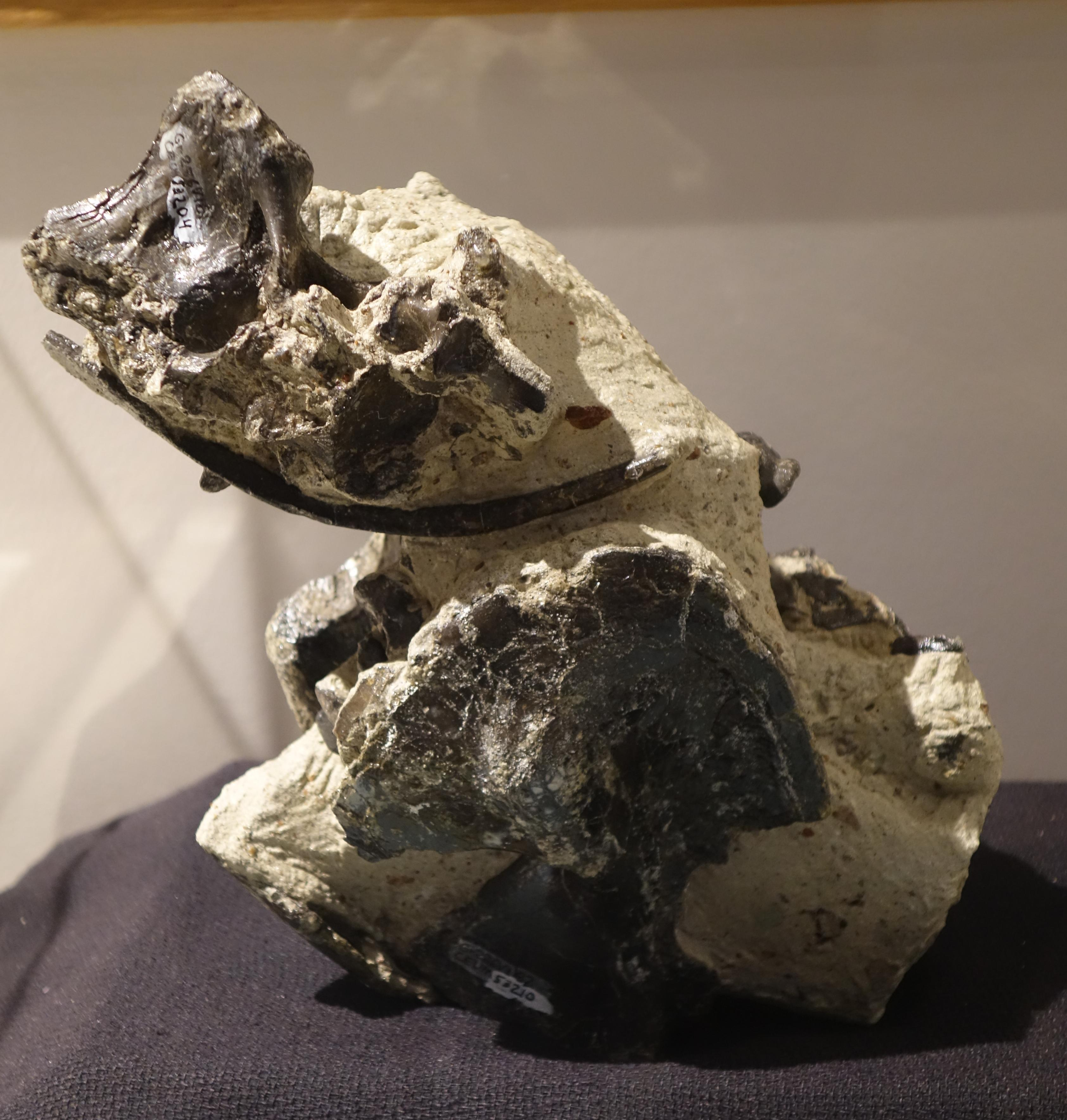
Block containing dense concentration of F. utahensis bones (specimen number CEUM 8429). On display at the USU Eastern Prehistoric Museum, Price, Utah

The remains of Falcarius were first discovered in 1999 by commercial fossil collector Lawrence Walker at the Crystal Geyser Quarry site in Grand County. He informed paleontologist James I. Kirkland of the find, who, with a team from the Utah Geological Survey, from 2001 onwards began to uncover the bones that proved to be present in a two-acre (8,000-square-meter) area of Utah's Cedar Mountain Formation (Yellow Cat member). Falcarius thus lived in the Early Cretaceous period. Two extensive bone beds were discovered, including the remains of hundreds, perhaps thousands, of individuals of the new species. The minimum number of individual animals was in 2006, estimated at three hundred. In 2005, over two thousand specimens had been excavated, mostly consisting of disarticulated bones. These included the remains of juvenile animals. In 2008, a second site was reported, the Suarez Quarry, with mainly adult individuals, but of a perhaps slightly different type. In 2010, the number of specimens from the original quarry had increased to over 2,700, and was later that year reported to have risen to over three thousand.

The first remains were partially described and discussed in 2004 in several abstracts by paleontologists Lindsay E. Zanno, then a doctoral student at the university, James I. Kirkland, Scott D. Sampson, chief curator at the University of Utah's Utah Museum of Natural History, Donald D. DeBlieux, David K. Smith and R. Kent Sanders. It was not formally named until a subsequent paper published in the May 2005 issue of the journal Nature.

Zanno subsequently and informally described Falcarius as "the ultimate in bizarre: a cross between an ostrich, a gorilla, and Edward Scissorhands." The generic name, Falcarius, is literally taken from the Latin falcarius (meaning sickle cutter) in reference to the large hand claws. The specific name, utahensis, reflects the provenance from Utah. The holotype specimen, UMNH VP 15000, consists of a partial braincase, and a large number of paratypes were assigned. Falcarius has since been described in detail by Zanno in a series of studies, beginning with her thesis in 2004.

=== Falcarius suarezarum ===
Comparison of select postcranial bones of F. utahensis and F. suarezarum

In 2010, Phil Senter and colleagues described Geminiraptor suarezarum as a new genus and species of troodontid based on specimen CEUM 7319, an isolated maxilla recovered from the Lower Yellow Cat Member of the Cedar Mountain Formation. The binomial name references Drs. Marina and Celina Suarez, the twin geologists who discovered the site from which the fossil was recovered. The Suarez site is a bonebed of dinosaur fossils, of which most belong to Falcarius. Senter et al. identified the remains as belonging to a troodontid much larger than other members of this clade from the Early Cretaceous.

In 2026, Freimuth, Lively & Zanno redescribed the holotype of G. suarezarum. They recognized several similarities with this bone and Falcarius utahensis, leading them to transfer "G." suarezarum to the genus Falcarius, creating the new combination Falcarius suarezarum. CT scanning of the maxilla revealed leaf-shaped replacement teeth, characteristic of therizinosaurs. The thousands of Falcarius bones—including additional cranial material and representative elements of most of the postcranium—from the Suarez bonebed were all tentatively referred to F. suarezarum, pending a thorough assessment of the assemblage.

== Description ==
Size of an average F. utahensis individual compared to a human

Falcarius utahensis is known from multiple specimens at different ontogenetic stages. While the smallest specimen was approximately less than 1 m (3.3 ft), average adults were about 4–5 m (13–16 ft) in length weighing approximately 100 kg (220 lb). Falcarius suarezarum is known from a bonebed of thousands of fossils, all of which are consistent with animals of a similar body size.

=== Skull ===
Overview of the known cranial bones of F. utahensis (top) and F. suarezarum (bottom)

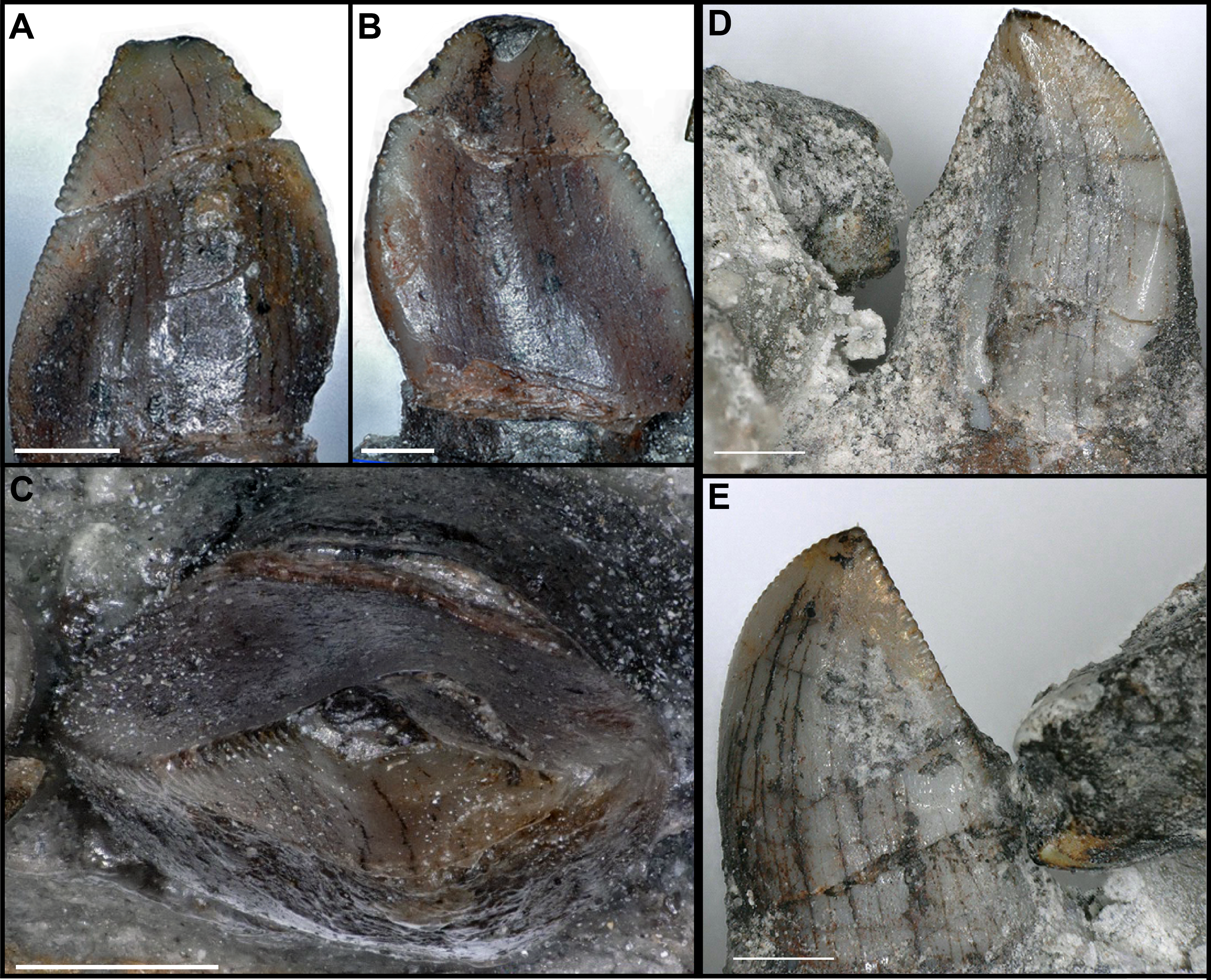
Dentary teeth of UMNH VP 14527 and UMNH VP 15259 (F. utahensis)

The head anatomy of both Falcarius species is partially known. The skull was small and elongated. With its long neck, Falcarius could apparently reach about 1.5 m (4.9 ft) off the ground to munch leaves or fruit, possibly higher. The teeth numbered at least sixteen in the maxilla of the upper jaw. The dentary (part of the lower jaw) carried twenty-eight teeth. Its small, leaf-shaped and very finely serrated maxillary teeth indicate that it consumed plant material. The front-most five teeth of the lower jaw are much longer, straighter, and more pointed, though, and might indicate a partially omnivorous diet including meat, e.g., small animals such as lizards. In the back of the head, the braincase was relatively large. Its lower elements were moderately inflated by pneumatised, hollowed-out bone tissue. The large skull opening in the snout, the fenestra antorbitalis, is positioned in a depression that reaches the side of the nasal bone. There are at least five pairs of conical teeth in the front of the lower jaws. These teeth are hollowed out on the inside. On the underside of the vertebrae of the neck, there is a depression with a ridge at the midline. On the underside of the braincase, there is a well-developed depression, the recessus basisphenoidalis. At the back of the head there are deep depressions below the occipital condyle and on the subotics, each with several pneumatic grooves.

=== Postcranial skeleton ===
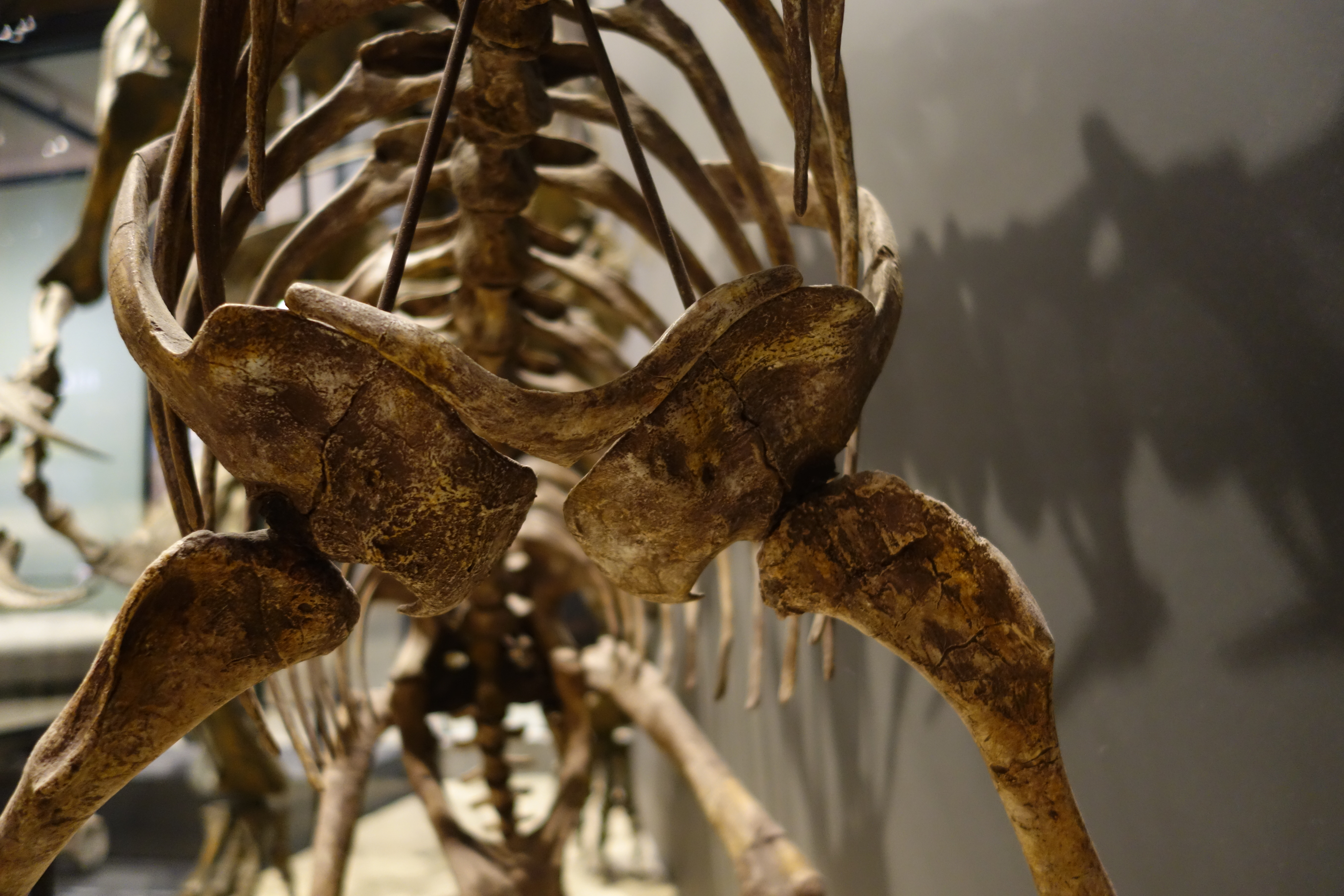
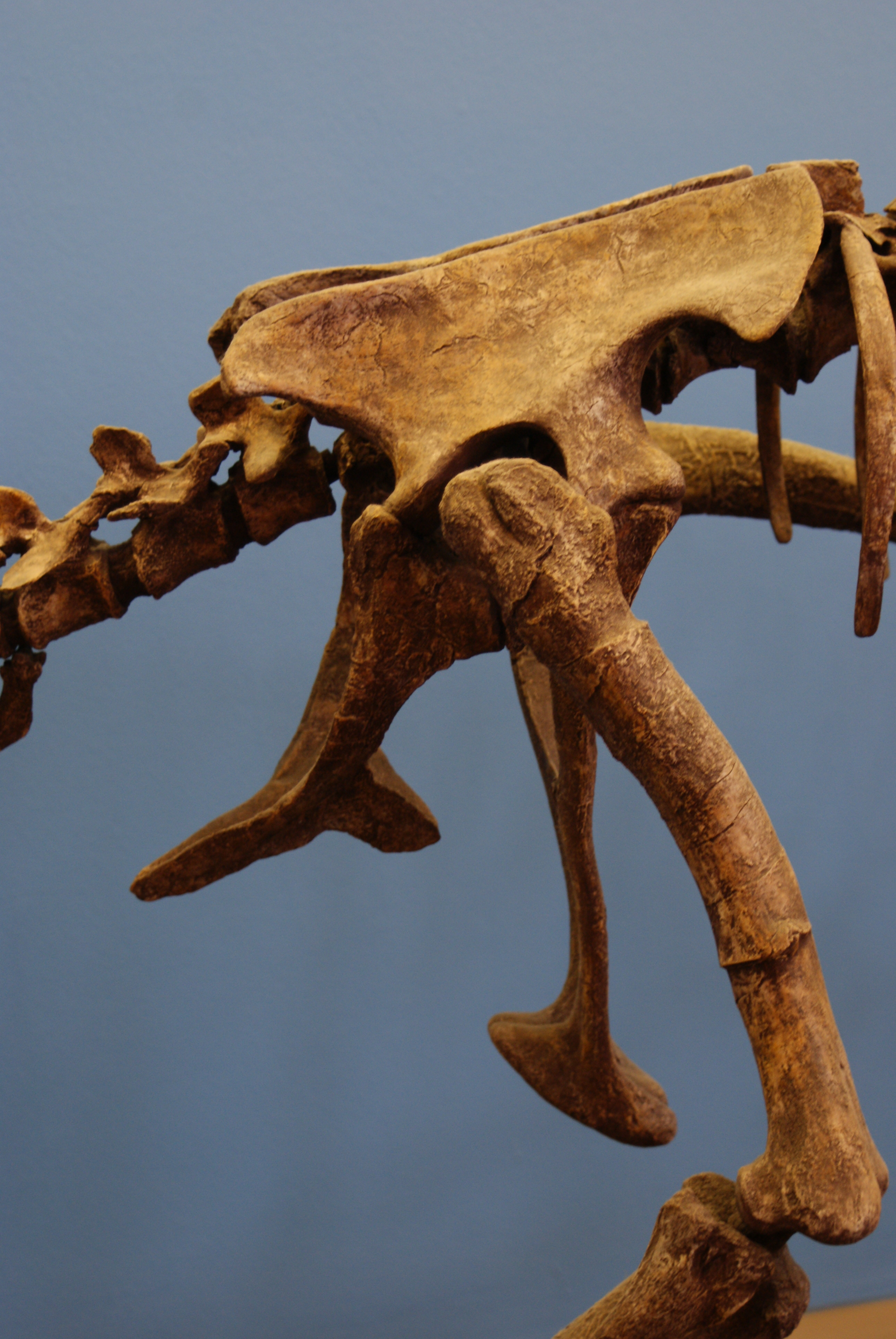
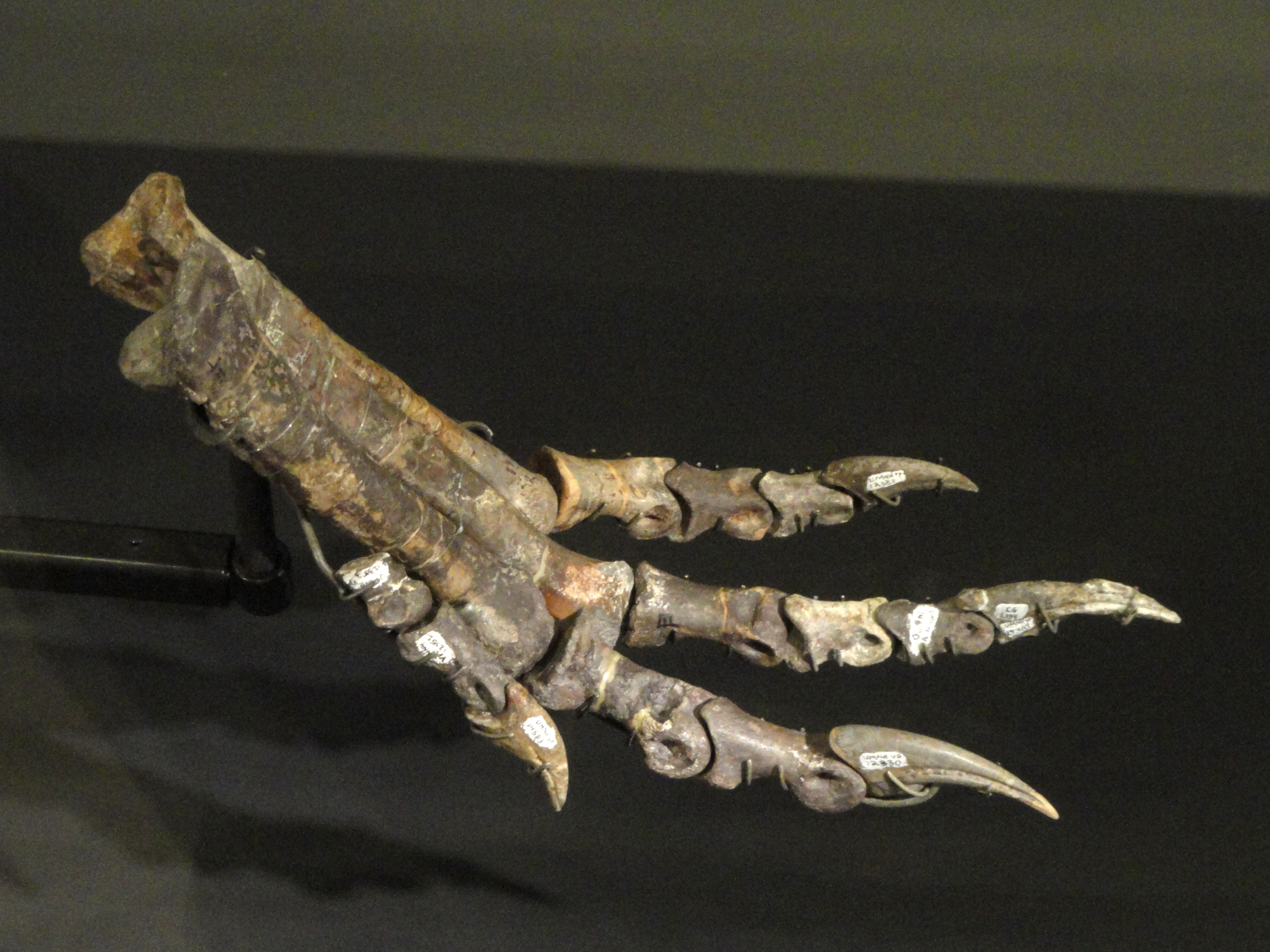
Top: F. utahensis pectoral girdle of skeletal cast
Middle: the propubic pelvis of F. utahensis, with the pubis pointing forwards
Bottom: Left foot of F. utahensis, showing the reduced dewclaw (or hallux)

The partitioning of the vertebral column followed that of most maniraptorans. The neck was very long with elongated cervical vertebrae. The tail was relatively long. The arm was moderately long with a somewhat robust humerus. The relatively large, and slightly recurved, pointed ten- to thirteen-centimeter (four- to five-inch) hand claws were likely used in self-defence.

Falcarius is known from many specimens, including complete forelimb specimens. Most of the bones of the pectoral girdle and forelimb are known, although sternal bones are not preserved. Both a left and right scapula are preserved, and they are both mostly complete as well. The blades of the scapulae are about 22.5 cm (225 mm) long, and also quite slender, with barely any expansion. They are curved instead of straight. The scapula is placed in a relatively high position. Two coracoids are also preserved, although they differ more than the scapulae in morphology. The right coracoid is the better preserved of the two. The coracoid is not especially enlarged. The furcula is elongated and narrow, its branches placed at an angle of 104°. It is V-shaped and possesses a small hypocleidium at the front. The arm as a whole is not especially developed in length but shows signs of increasing robustness. The humerus has a rather short triangular deltopectoral crest. The epicondyles are exceptionally thick, indicating a strong musculature. The ulna is lightly curved.

The hand is rather long but not very robust, with in general an elongated metacarpus, although the first metacarpal is short. The first finger diverges from the second finger, the longest of the hand. The third finger is very thin. The hand claws are moderately curved, rather pointed, and moderately long. The vertebrae of the back have, below their front extensions, the prezygapophyses, a groove which is divided into three smaller depressions. On the thumb claw, the raised attachment point for the tendon of the extensor muscle is bordered by deep grooves for ligaments. The middle vertebrae of the back have a second ridge extending from the base of the upper rib joint, the diapophysis, to the back of the vertebra. In the arm, the shaft of the humerus is reinforced by powerful, somewhat obliquely placed, thickenings extending towards the condyles of the lower joint, which swellings have a hollow front edge. The front edge of the hip joint has a prominent swelling, pointing sideways to the back, on the pubis. In the pelvis, the ilium was by a moderate inclination partly adapted to a more raised position of the trunk. The pelvis was propubic or mesopubic: the pubic bone pointed more or less forwards. The leg was relatively long and adapted to running, with the lower leg longer than the thighbone. In the foot there were three weight-bearing toes. The first toe did not reach the ground, nor did the first metatarsal touch the ankle.

== Classification ==
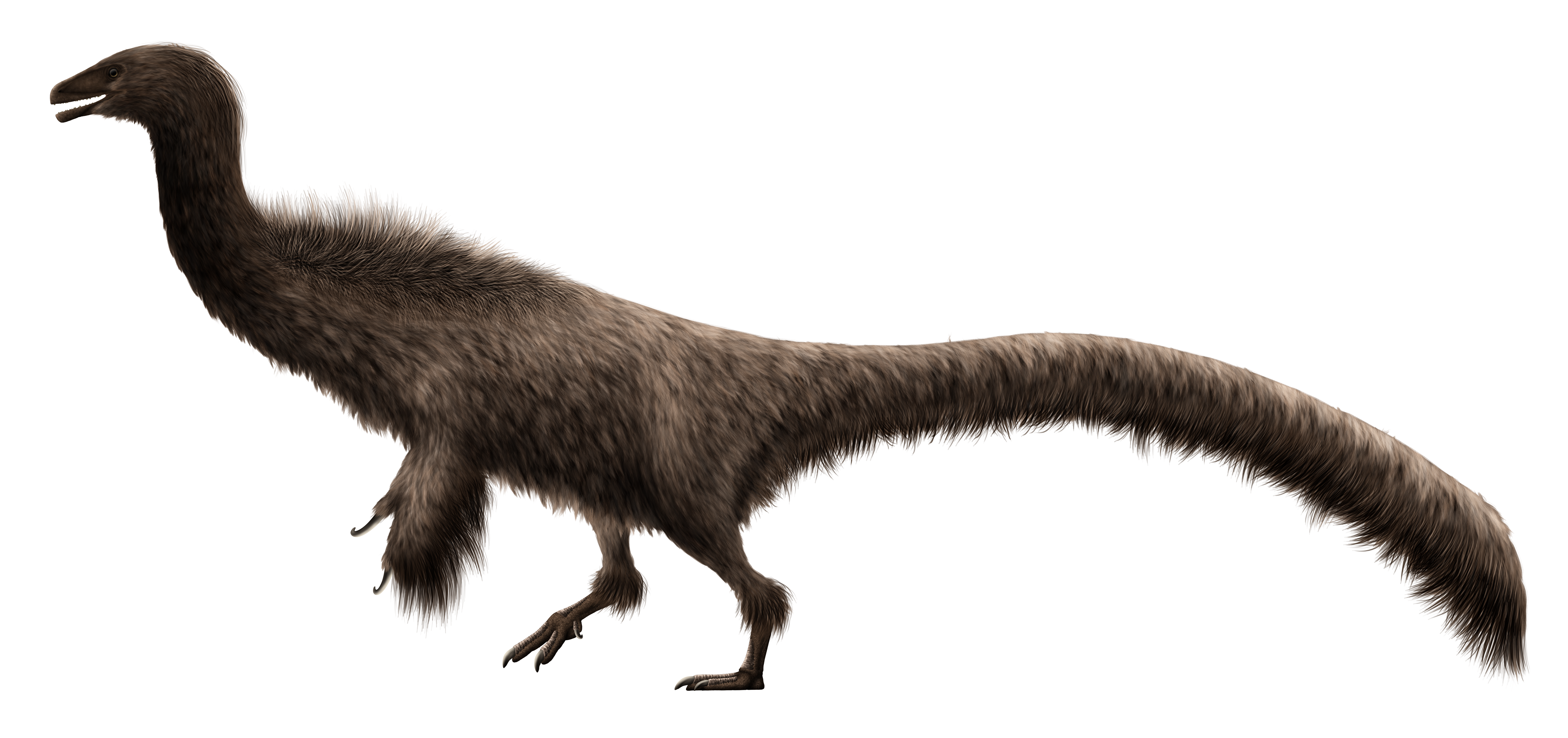
Life restoration os F. utahensis (top) and F. suarezarum (bottom)

The describers in 2005 assigned Falcarius to the Therizinosauroidea sensu of Zhang, in a basal position. Zanno later placed it as the basalmost taxon in the Therizinosauria, just outside of Therizinosauroidea sensu of Sereno.

Because of the primitive position and relative completeness of Falcarius, it is a good taxon to use to compare to related groups and descendant taxa. Falcarius resembles dinosaurs belonging to the Therizinosauridae, part of the group Maniraptora. Falcarius itself probably does not belong to this former group, although it does belong to the more inclusive group Therizinosauria. The group is characterized by wider hips, a comparatively large braincase, and long necks typical of plant eaters. The less basal Asian specimens were covered in quill-like feathers; this is assumed for Falcarius as well. In general, Falcarius can be seen as a transitional form between the original theropod build and the more derived Therizinosauridae. Falcarius shared some derived traits with the therizinosaurids: it had a long neck, a small head with teeth adapted for eating plant material, a more robust arm with large hand-claws, and a more vertical position of the body. On the other hand, it resembled more typical theropods in having a long tail, a propubic pelvis, a long lower leg, and a foot whose innermost toe did not reach the ground.

In their 2026 reassessment of F. suarezarum, Freimuth et al. conducted phylogenetic analyses using two different matrices: one broadly focused on coelurosaurian theropods, and one more focused on therizinosaurs. Most iterations of these analyses, whether testing just the F. suarezarum holotype maxilla or all of the referred skull bones—consistently recovered this species as the sister taxon to F. utahensis near the base of Therizinosauria. The results of their time-calibrated Bayesian analysis are displayed in the cladogram below:

- Therizinosauria
  - Fukuivenator paradoxus
  - - - Falcarius suarezarum
      - Falcarius utahensis
    - Therizinosauroidea
      - Beipiaosaurus inexpectus
      - - Alxasaurus elesitaiensis
        - Therizinosauridae
          - - Enigmosaurus mongoliensis
            - - Therizinosaurus cheloniformis
              - - Erliansaurus bellamanus
                - Neimongosaurus yangi
          - - Suzhousaurus megatherioides
            - - Erlikosaurus andrewsi
              - - "Nanshiungosaurus" bohlini
                - - Nothronychus spp.
                  - Segnosaurus galbinensis

== See also ==
- Timeline of therizinosaur research
