= Timeline of therizinosaur research =

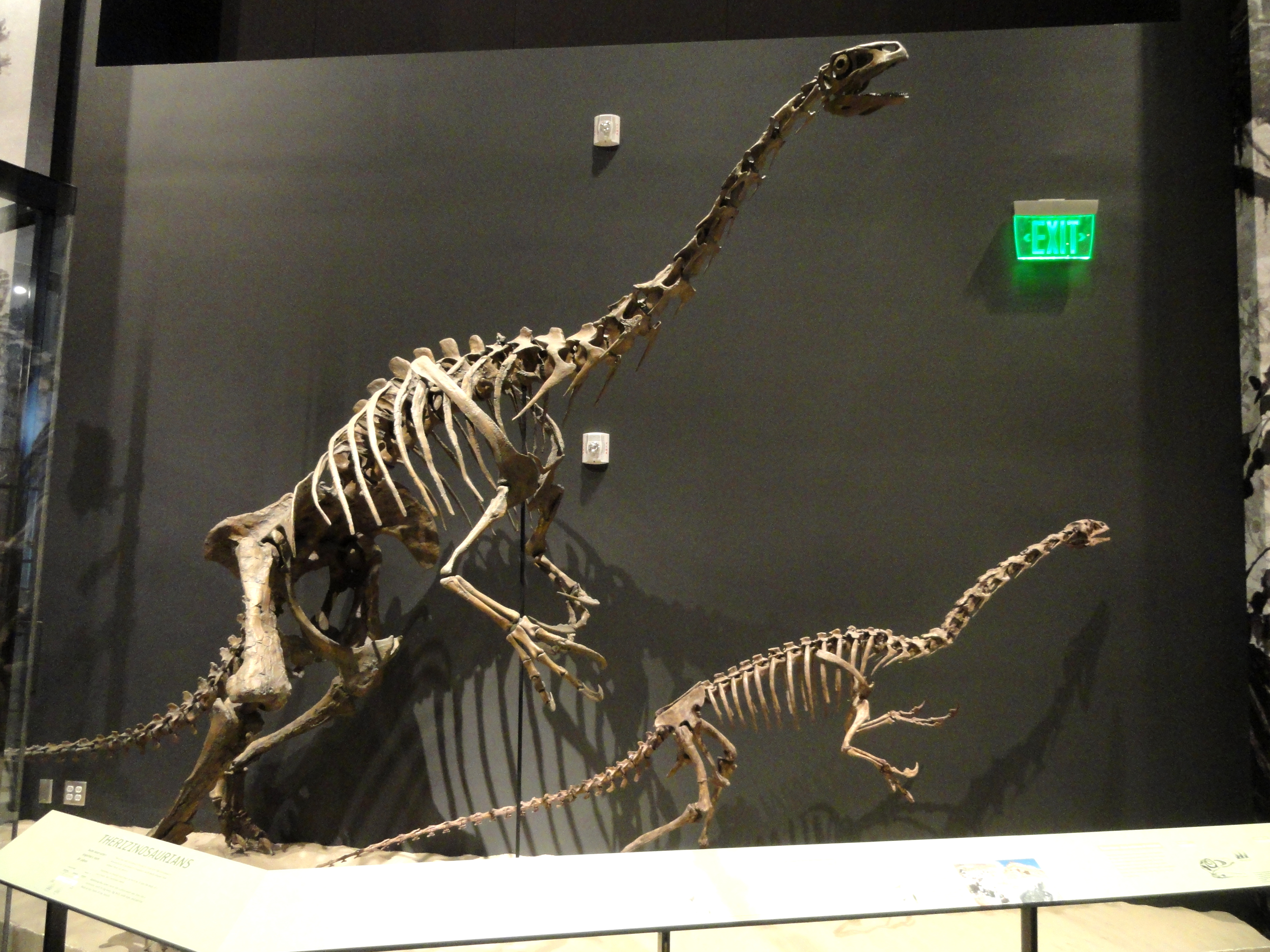
Reconstructed skeleton of the therizinosaurs Falcarius utahensis and Nothronychus graffami

The timeline of therizinosaur research is a chronological listing of events in the history of paleontology focused on therizinosaurs. They were unusually long-necked, pot-bellied, and large-clawed herbivorous theropods most closely related to birds. The early history of therizinosaur research occurred in three phases. The first phase was the discovery of scanty and puzzling fossils in Asia by the Central Asiatic Expeditions of the 1920s and Soviet-backed research in the 1950s. This phase resulted in the discovery of the Therizinosaurus cheloniformis type specimen. Soviet paleontologist Evgeny Maleev interpreted these unusual remains as belonging to some kind of gigantic turtle.

The second major phase of therizinosaur research followed the discovery of better preserved remains in the 1970s by collaborative research between the Soviets and Mongolians. These finds revealed the true nature of therizinosaurs as bizarre dinosaurs. However, the exact nature and classification of therizinosaurs within Dinosauria was controversial as was their paleobiology. When Rozhdestventsky first reinterpreted therizinosaurs as dinosaurs he argued that they were unusual theropods that may have used their clawed arms to break open termite mounds or collect fruit. Osmolska and Roniewicz also considered therizinosaurs to be theropods.

In 1979, Altangerel Perle named the new species Segnosaurus galbinensis, which although he recognized was an unusual theropod, he did not recognize as a therizinosaur. Consequently, he named the new family Segnosauridae and, in 1980, Segnosauria. Two years later, Perle recognized commonalities between Therizinosaurus and segnosaurs, reclassifying the former as a member of the latter. From hereout therizinosaur research was considered "segnosaur" research. Perle himself thought that his "segnosaurs" were semi-aquatic fish-eaters. However, in the early 1990s, researchers like Rinchen Barsbold and Teresa Maryańska cast doubt on the connection between therizinosaurs and segnosaurs altogether.

Nevertheless, the description Alxasaurus elsitaiensis provided more evidence for a close relationship between the therizinosaurs and "segnosaurs" and led to a revision of their classification. The discovery of this and other primitive therizinosaurs in China formed the beginnings of the third major wave of therizinosaur research. That same year Russell and Russell reinterpreted therizinosaurs as herbivorous foragers like mammalian chalicotherium. Other significant finds of the 1990s include therizinosaur eggs with embryos preserved inside and the first known therizinosaur with feathers, Beipiaosaurus, which was described from China in 1999.

== 20th century ==
=== 1950s ===
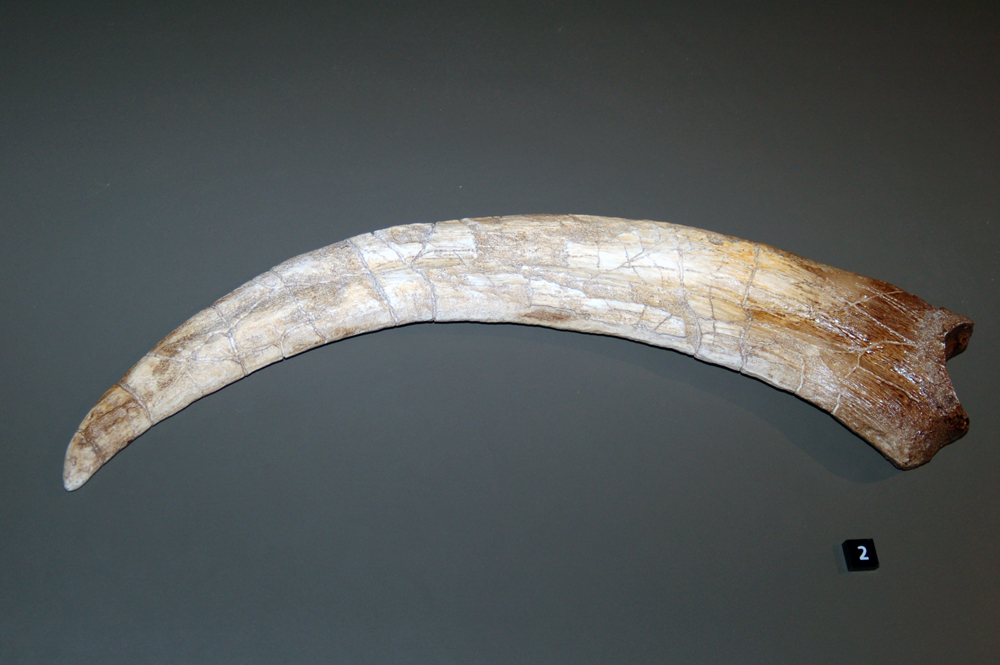
Holotype claw cast of Therizinosaurus

==== 1954 ====
- Evgeny Maleev described the new genus and species Therizinosaurus cheloniformis. from the Nemegt Formation He interpreted it as a gigantic turtle. Maleev also named the family Therizinosauridae to contain this species.

=== 1960s ===
==== 1964 ====
- Zakharov described and named the genus and type ichnospecies Macropodosaurus gravis, which is represented by a series of four-toed footprints.

=== 1970s ===
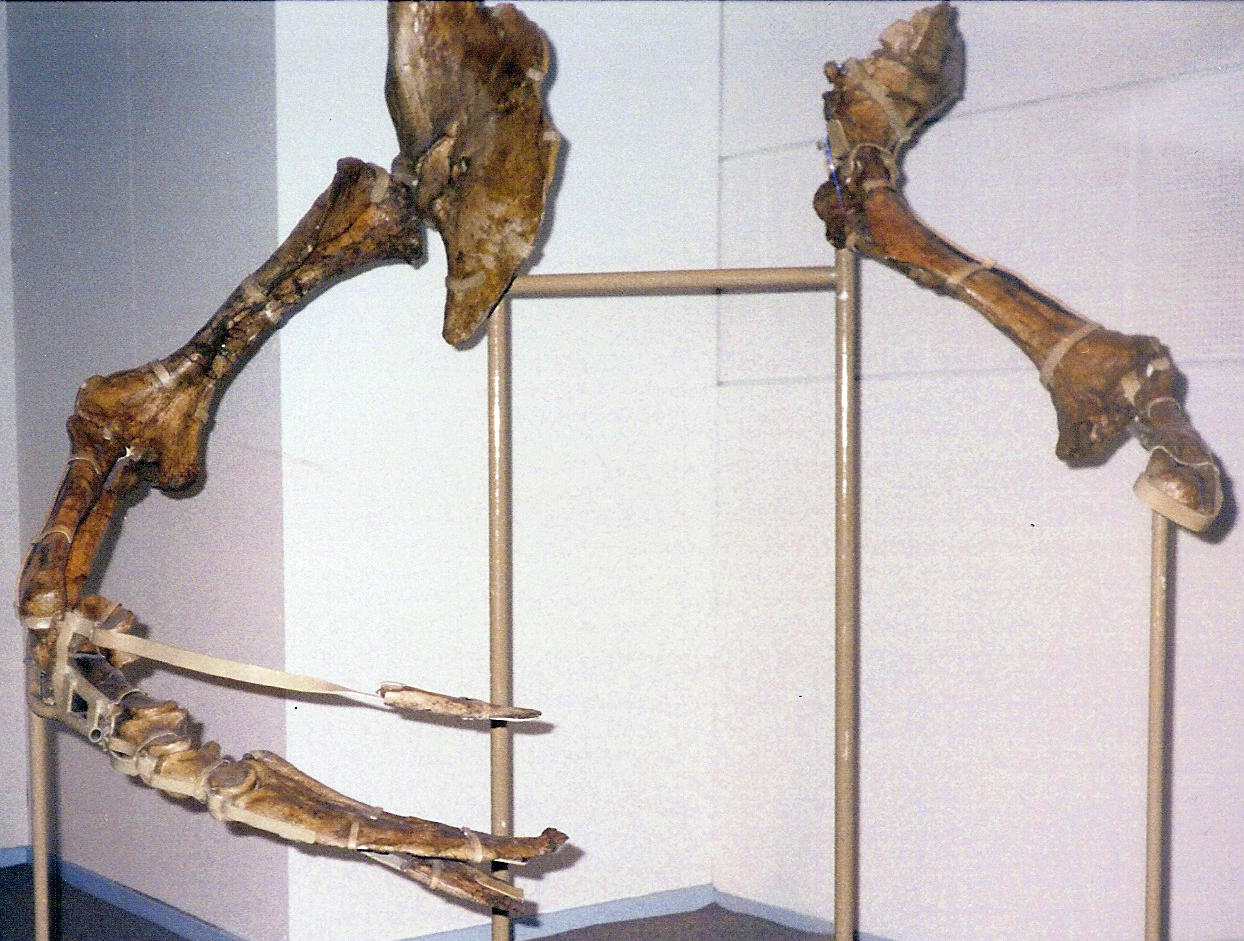
Referred arms to Therizinosaurus by Barsbold

==== 1970 ====
- Rozhdestventsky first proposed the idea that therizinosaurids were actually theropod dinosaurs. He thought they used their large claws to tear open termite mounds or collect fruit from trees.
- Osmolska and Roniewicz also interpreted Therizinosaurus as a carnosaur theropod.

==== 1976 ====
- Barsbold proposed the Deinocheirosauria and included Therizinosaurus as a member.
- In another paper during the same year, Barsbold referred a shoulder and forearm found in the same strata as the Therizinosaurus type specimen to that genus because of the resemblance between the specimens claws. He observed that the anatomy of the arm and shoulder remains suggested that it belonged to a theropod dinosaur. Barsbold also remarked on similarities it shared with Deinocheirus, another mysterious dinosaur from the same rock unit.

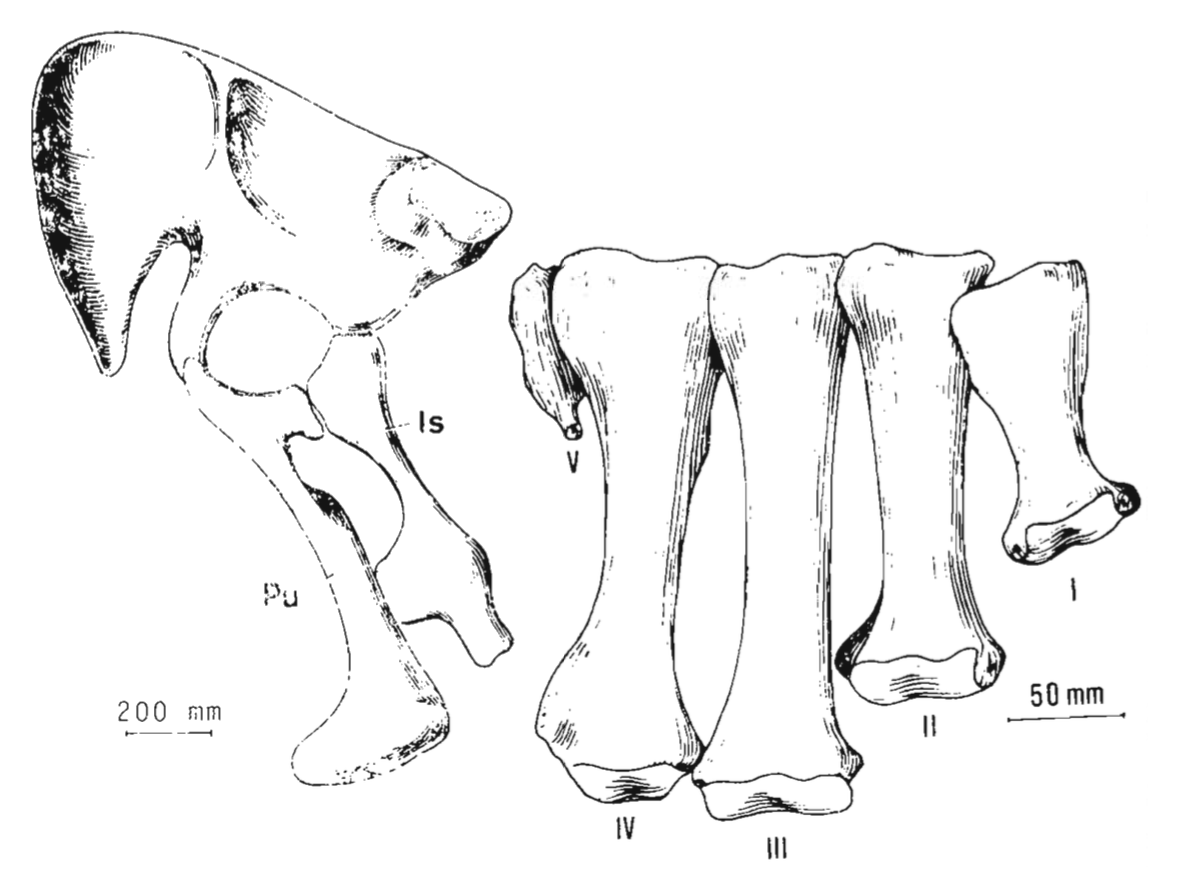
Segnosaurus holotype pelvis and metatarsus

==== 1979 ====
- Dong described the new genus and species Nanshiungosaurus brevispinus based on a vertebral column and pelvis. He interpreted Nanshiungosaurus as a new genus of dwarf sauropods. He also described the new species Chilantaisaurus zheziangensis but interpreted it as a carnosaur.
- Perle described the new genus and species Segnosaurus galbinensis based on mostly complete limbs and girdles. He erected a new family, the Segnosauridae, for this unusual dinosaur. He tentatively regarded it as a theropod.

=== 1980s ===
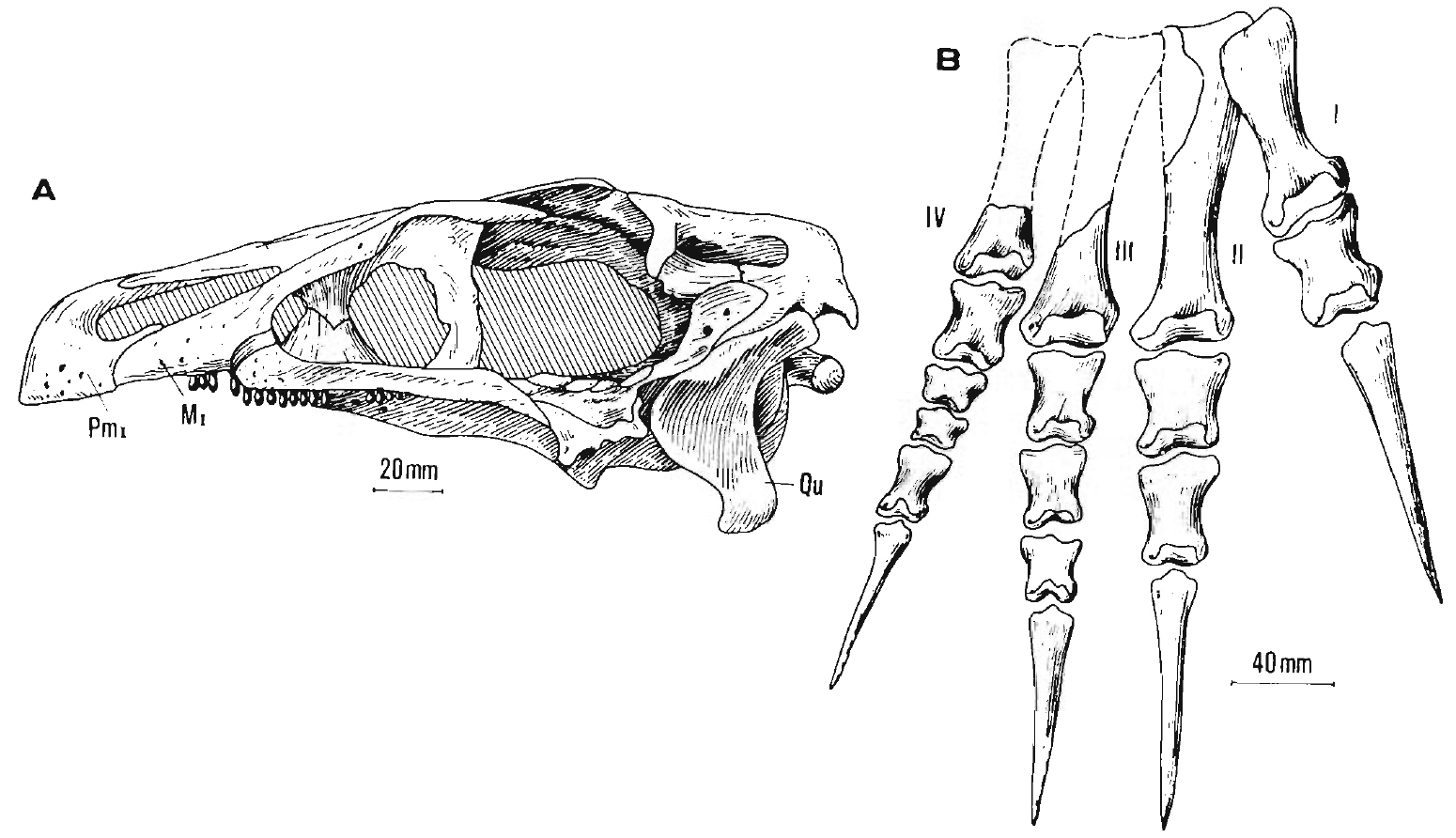
Erlikosaurus holotype skull and feet

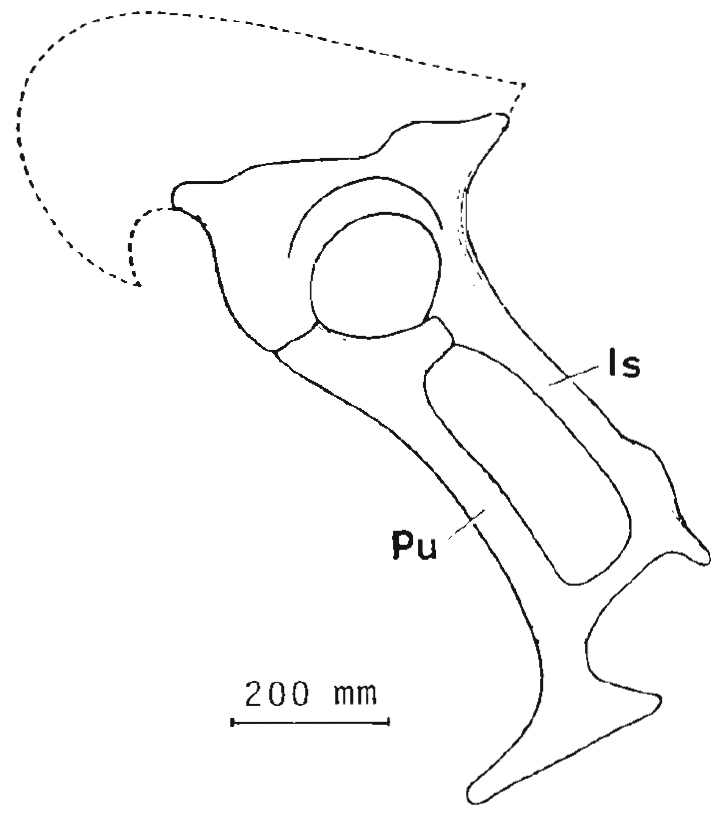
Enigmosaurus holotype pelvis

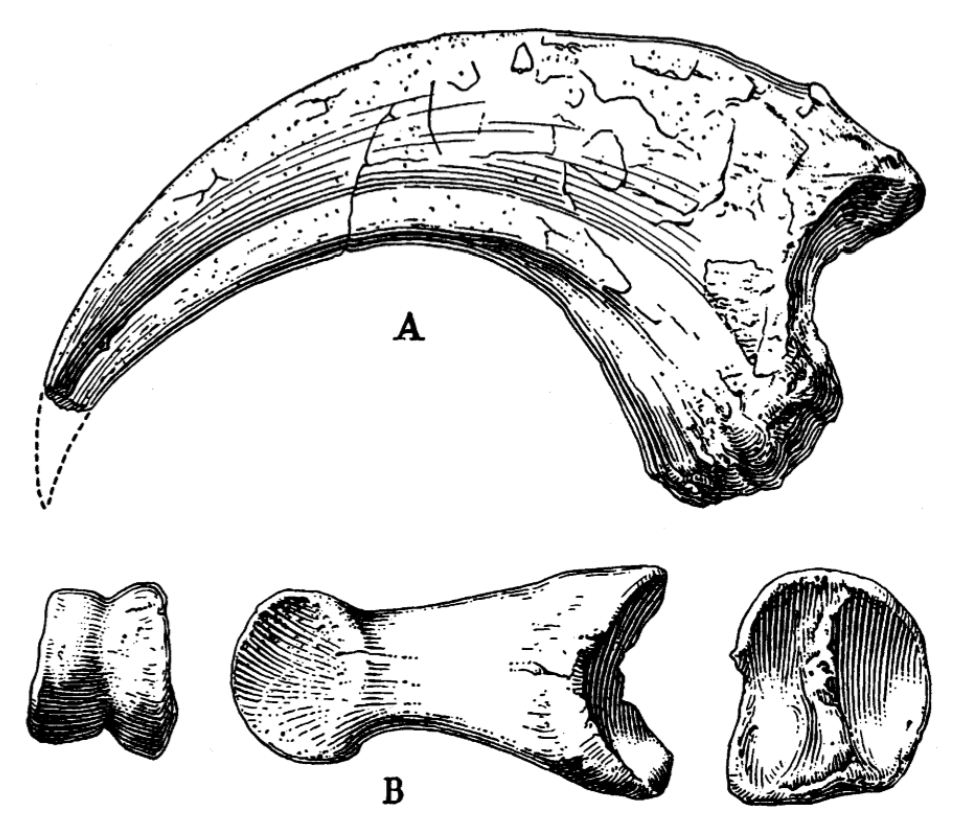
Claws initially identified as Alectrosaurus

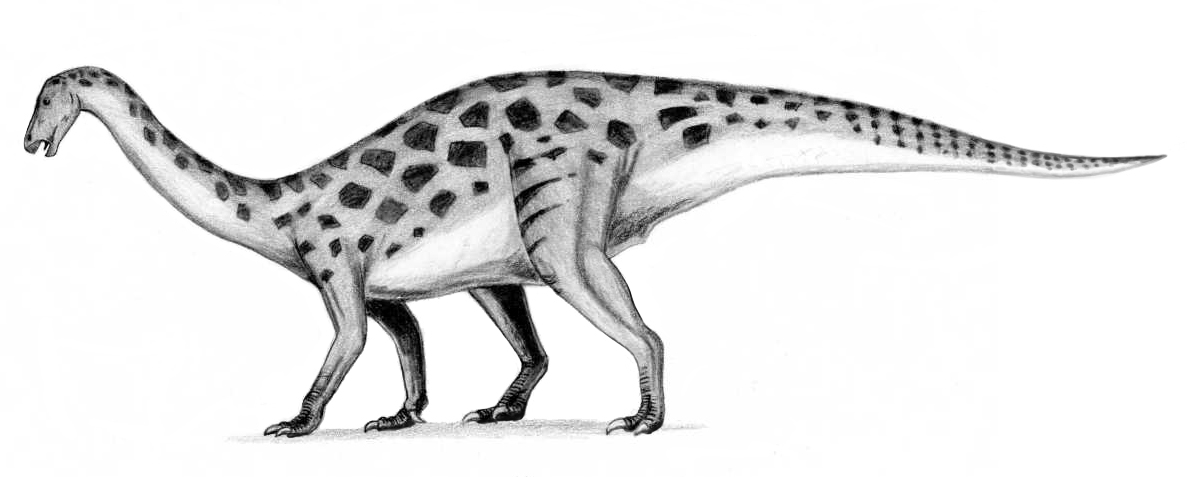
Prosauropod-like restoration of Erlikosaurus

==== 1980 ====
- Barsbold and Perle named the Segnosauria and described the new genus and species Erlikosaurus andrewsi. They also described in brief detail an unknown segnosaur. Barsbold and Perle thought segnosaurs were slow, semi-aquatic animals.

==== 1981 ====
- Perle redescribed the holotype of Erlikosaurus but this time in more detail and misspelled Erlicosaurus.

==== 1982 ====
- Perle reported an unusual partial four-toed hind limb from Hermiin Tsav, Nemegt Formation. Because this partial leg was found not far from where Barsbold reported the shoulder and humerus he referred to Therizinosaurus, Perle thought that his specimen also probably belonged to that taxon. Since this leg was similar to those of segnosaurs, he classified Therizinosaurus as a segnosaur.

==== 1983 ====
- Barsbold described the new genus and species Enigmosaurus mongoliensis based on a partial pelvis from the previously unknown segnosaur. Barsbold regarded Enigmosaurus as so unusual that he gave it its own family, the Enigmosauridae.

==== 1984 ====
- Paul suggested that segnosaurs shared an evolutionary relationship with prosauropods and ornithischians. He thought this implied that they were probably herbivores.

==== 1986 ====
- Gauthier considered segnosaurs to be relatives of sauropodomorphs.

==== 1989 ====
- Paul Sereno also followed this new interpretation of segnosaurs.
- Bryn J. Mader and colleagues re-examined the specimens assigned to Alectrosaurus and concluded that the large humerus and unguals used by Gilmore in 1933 did not come from a tyrannosauroid, but a therizinosaurid.

=== 1990s ===
==== 1990 ====
- Barsbold and Maryanska reinterpreted the theropod Nanshiungosaurus and the carnosaur Chilantaisaurus as segnosaurs. They agreed with Perle that the partial hind limb from Hermiin Tsav he described in 1982 was segnosaurian, but cast doubt with his referral of it to Therizinosaurus, and therefore with his subsequent conclusion that Therizinosaurus was a segnosaur. Barsbold and Maryanska also disagreed with previous researchers who classified Deinocheirus as a segnosaur.
- David B. Norman considered Therizinosaurus to be a theropod of uncertain classification.

==== 1992 ====
- A collaborative expedition between Chinese and Japanese scientists discovered the type specimen of the new segnosaur species. In addition, Dong named the Segnosaurischia to place segnosaurs on an equal rank with Saurischia and Ornithischia.

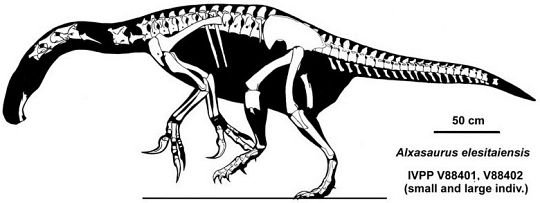
Skeletal composite of Alxasaurus specimens

==== 1993 ====
- Russel and Dong described the new genus and species Alxasaurus elsitaiensis. They considered it distinct enough to warrant its own family, the Alxasauridae. They pointed out similar anatomical traits in the anatomy of the hand of the partial forelimb Barsbold referred to Therizinosaurus in 1976 and those of segnosaurs. They concluded that therizinosaurids and segnosaurids were theropods and almost identical in traits, and synonymized the Therizinosauridae and Segnosauridae, with the former having nomenclatural priority and coined the superfamily Therizinosauroidea to contain Alxasaurus and its family. The relative completeness of the specimens concluded the debate on whether or not segnosaurs were theropods in the affirmative.
- Russell and Russell noticed that segnosaurs had similar body plans to chalicotheres and ground sloths and concluded that they may have used their large forelimbs to forage in a similar manner.

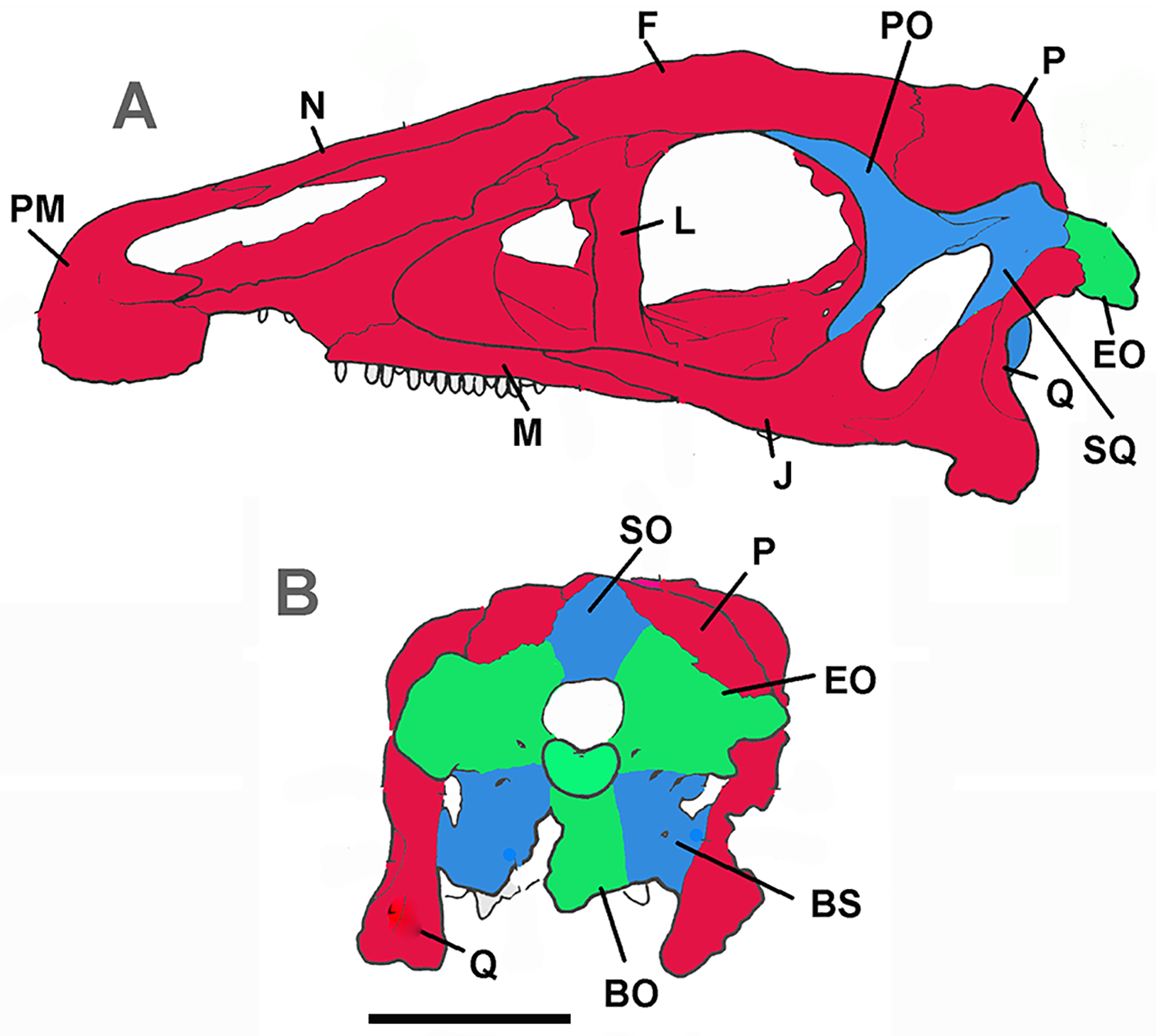
Erlikosaurus skull scheme

==== 1994 ====
- Clark and others redescribed the skull of Erlikosaurus. They found more evidence that segnosaurs were theropods and classified them as maniraptorans.

==== 1995 ====
- Nessov speculated that segnosaurs may have hung from trees using their large claws like sloths do and fed on wasp nests. He reported the discovery of segnosaur remains in Kazakhstan and Uzbekistan.

==== 1996 ====
- Currie attributed some Late Cretaceous eggs and their embryos from the Nanchao Formation of Henan, China to segnosaur dinosaurs. These spherical eggs still preserve the fossilized remains of their developing embryos.
- In a second paper, Currie attributed another kind of fossil egg from an entirely different oofamily to segnosaurs. Unlike the spherical eggs of his first paper, these huge "elongated" eggs are classified as members of the Elongatoolithidae and could reach lengths of up to 50 cm.

==== 1997 ====
- Manning and others did not agree with Currie's referral of elongatoolithid eggs to segnosaurs.
- Dong and Yu described the new species "Nanshiungosaurus bohlini" discovered during the 1992 Sino-Japanese expedition, and coined the Nanshiungosauridae to contain it and Nanshiungosaurus.
- Russell coined the Therizinosauria in order to contain all segnosaurs. This new infraorder was composed of Therizinosauroidea and the more advanced Therizinosauridae. With this, the terms segnosaur and Segnosauria became synonyms to therizinosaur and Therizinosauria, respectively.

==== 1998 ====
- Zhao and Xu reported the existence of a possible therizinosaur dentary dating back to the Early Jurassic.

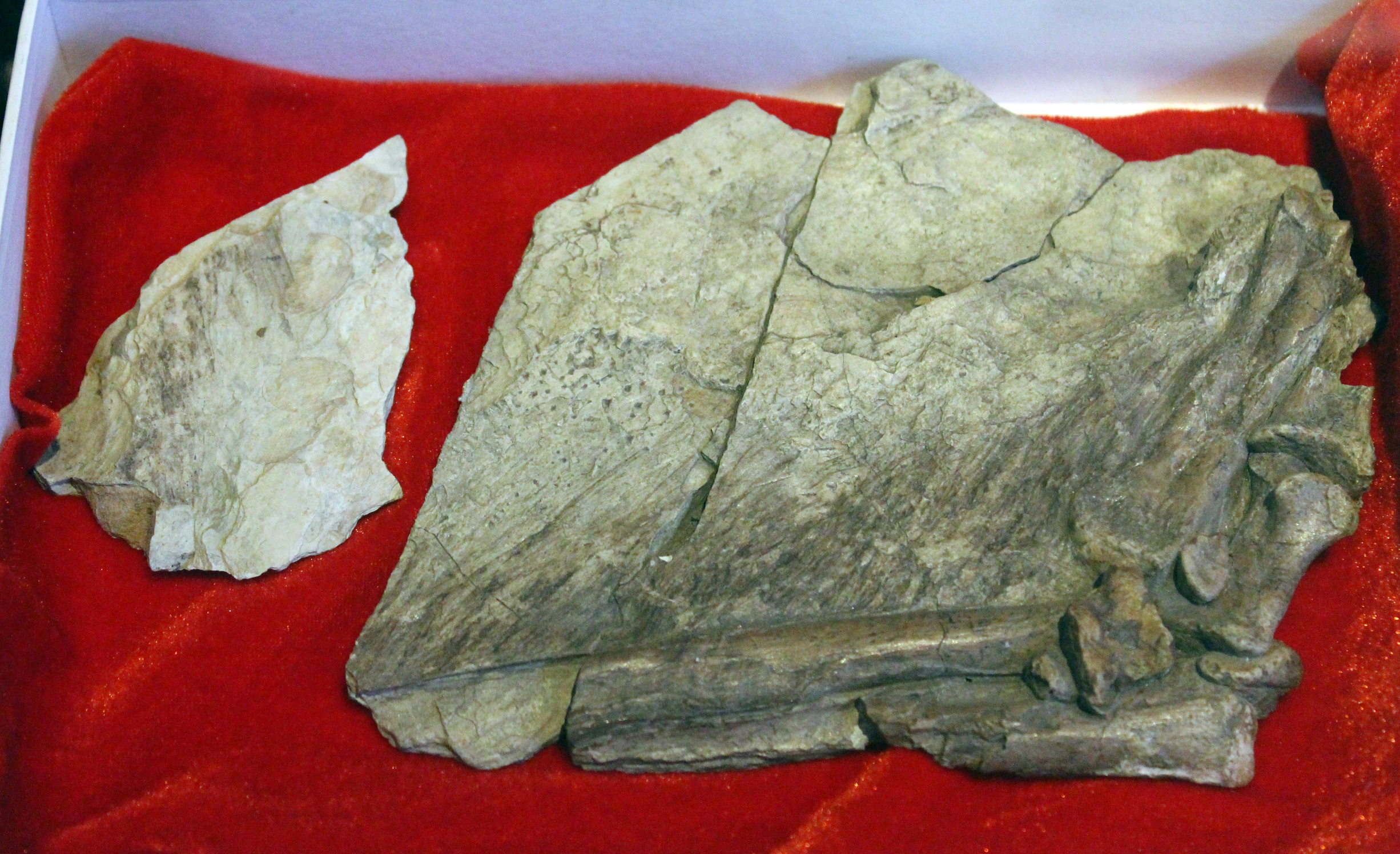
Left arm feather impressions from the Beipiaosaurus holotype

==== 1999 ====
- Xu, Tang, and Wang described the new genus and species Beipiaosaurus inexpectus. The type specimen actually preserves impressions of the animal's feathered integument. It was also the oldest known therizinosaur.
- Carpenter reported that the embryos Currie considered therizinosaurian had teeth in their premaxillae, unlike any known member of the group. This could be evidence that the egglayer was actually primitive for a therizinosaur. He also did not confirm Currie's referral of elongatoolithid eggs to therizinosaurs.

== 21st century ==
=== 2000s ===
==== 2000 ====
- Manning and others observed that the embryos identified by Currie in 1996 as therizinosaurian had "an unusual pattern of tooth replacement in which a slender, elongate tooth is replaced by a symmetrical, denticulate tooth". Contrary to Carpenter's claim in 1999, Manning and his colleagues reported the embryos premaxillae as toothless.

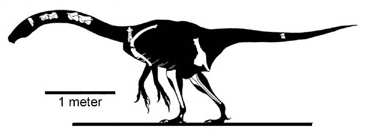
Holotype elements from N. mckinleyi

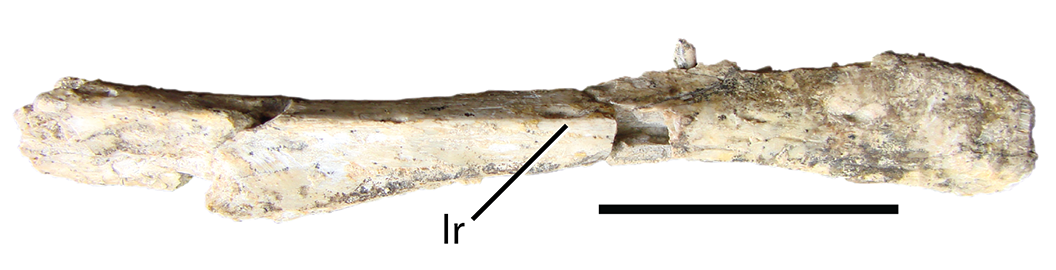
Holotype dentary of Eshanosaurus

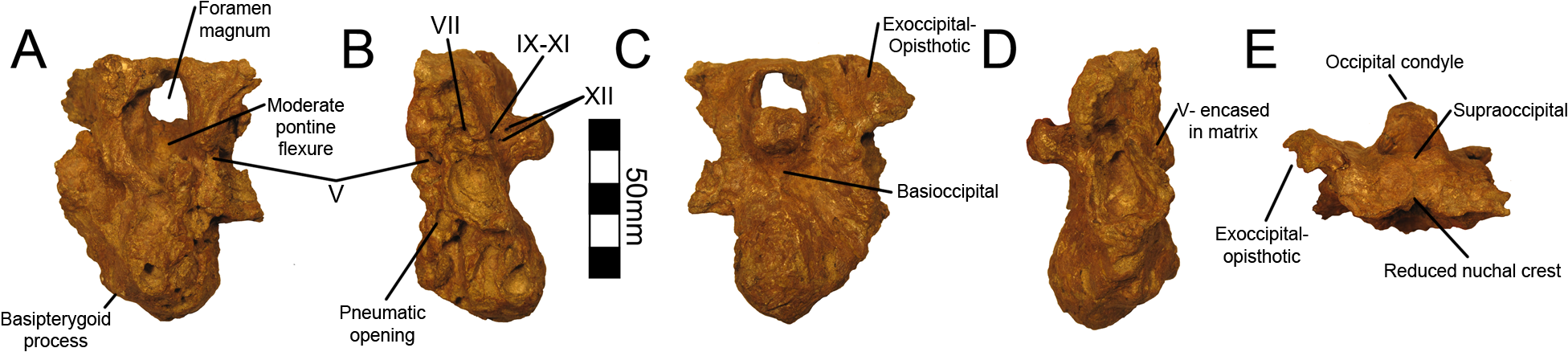
Holotype braincase of N. mckinleyi

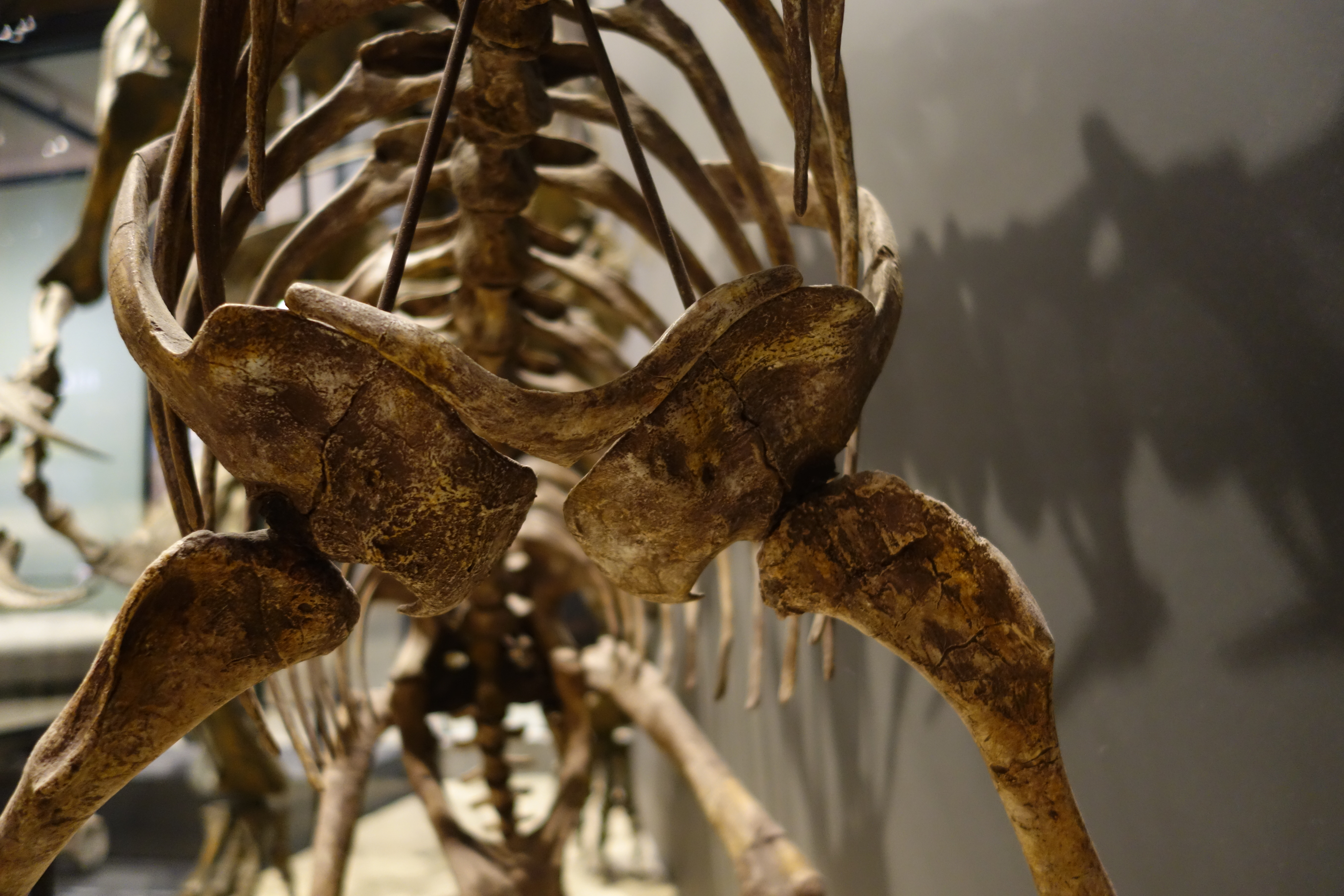
Pectoral girdle of Falcarius

==== 2001 ====
- Xu, Zhao, and Clark described the new genus and species Eshanosaurus deguchiianus based on the Early Jurassic dentary. This species was the probably oldest known therizinosaur.
- Kirkland and Wolfe described the new genus and species Nothronychus mckinleyi. This was the first definitive therizinosaurid discovered outside of Asia. They also found that Eshanosaurus had a similar dentition to prosauropods.
- Zhang and others described the new genus and species Neimongosaurus yangi.

==== 2002 ====
- Xu and others described the new genus and species Erliansaurus bellamanus.

==== 2003 ====
- Xu and team described new pelvic and tail material from the holotype of Beipiaosaurus. These were discovered during a re-excavation of the fossil quarry were the first elements of the holotype were found.

==== 2004 ====
- Kirkland and colleagues briefly reported and described primitive remains of therizinosaurs found in Utah.
- The same team made comparisons with braincases found among the remains and that of Nothronychus mckinleyi.
- Lindsay Zanno continue with these short descriptions but this time focused on forelimb elements.
- Zanno discussed in more detail these elements in her Ph.D.

==== 2005 ====
- Kirkland and others described the primitive new genus and species Falcarius utahensis based on the multiple remains previously described.

==== 2006 ====
- Zanno and Erickson briefly discussed the growth of Falcarius which was represented by adult and juvenile specimens.
- Zanno formally published and described the pectoral anatomy of Falcarius.
- Bursh reported the inferred range of motion in the therizinosaurids Neimongosaurus, which was very pronounced and circular.
- Andrey G. Sennikov re-examined Macropodosaurus and concluded that a therizinosaurid-grade dinosaur made those tracks, suggesting a possible plantigrade stance. He also considered these tracks to be more associated with therizinosaurids.

==== 2007 ====
Embryonic therizinosaurid based on Nanchao embryos

- Li and others described the new genus and species Suzhousaurus megatherioides.
- Kundrát with colleagues described in detail the embryos from the Nanchao Formation.

==== 2008 ====
- A new specimen of Suzhousaurus was described by Li and colleagues.
- Lee and colleagues reported new therizinosaurid specimens composed of partially complete skeletons collected from the Nemegt Formation.

==== 2009 ====
- Zanno and colleagues described the newer N. graffami, a second and more complete species of the genus Nothronychus.
- Barrett considered that the highly dubious and controversial Eshanosaurus was a therizinosaur taxon.
- Xu and colleagues described a new specimen of Beipiaosaurus preserving a partial skeleton and extensive feather integument. The latter were so unique compared to other feather types that they had to describe a new, primitive type of feathers named EBFFs (elongated broad filamentous feathers).

=== 2010s ===
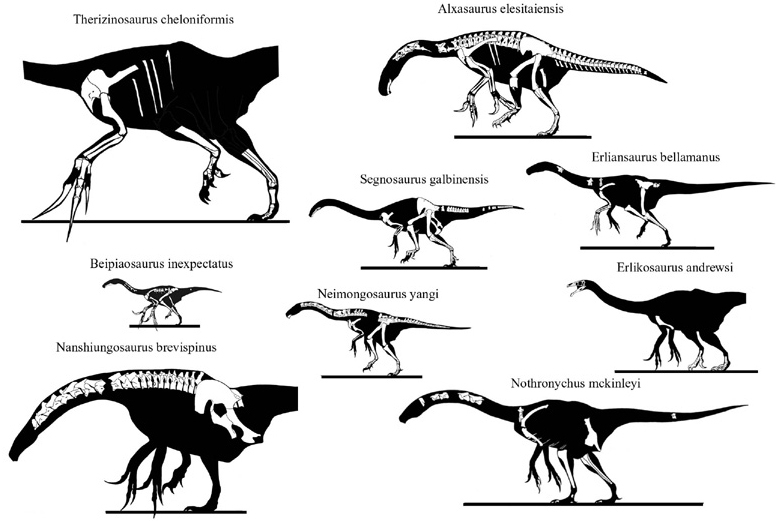
Skeletal composite of therizinosaurs (not to scale)

==== 2010 ====
- Zanno described in detail the osteology of Falcarius based on numerous specimens.
- Zanno conducted the most detailed phylogenetic analysis of the Therizinosauria to that point. She cited the inaccessibility, damage, potential loss of holotype specimens, scarcity of cranial remains, and fragmentary specimens with few overlapping elements as the most significant obstacles to resolving the evolutionary relationships within the group. She also revised Therizinosauroidea to exclude Falcarius and retained it in the wider clade Therizinosauria, which became the senior synonym of Segnosauria.
- Senter and James suggested the ecological niches for Therizinosaurus and Deinocheirus were characterized by high-browsing life styles. Therizinosaurus was found to be among the tallest dinosaurs in the Nemegt Formation. They also calculated that an average Therizinosaurus may have had 3 m (9.8 ft) long hindlimbs.

==== 2011 ====
- Smith and team described in detail the braincase anatomy of Falcarius.
- Zanno and Makovicky found therizinosaurs and other groups of herbivorous dinosaurs that had beaks and retained teeth were unable to lose their teeth completely because they lacked gastric mills (gizzards) and needed the teeth to process food. The high-fiber folivorous (leaf-based) diet of therizinosaurs and other archosaurs may also have precluded the evolution of a complete beak.

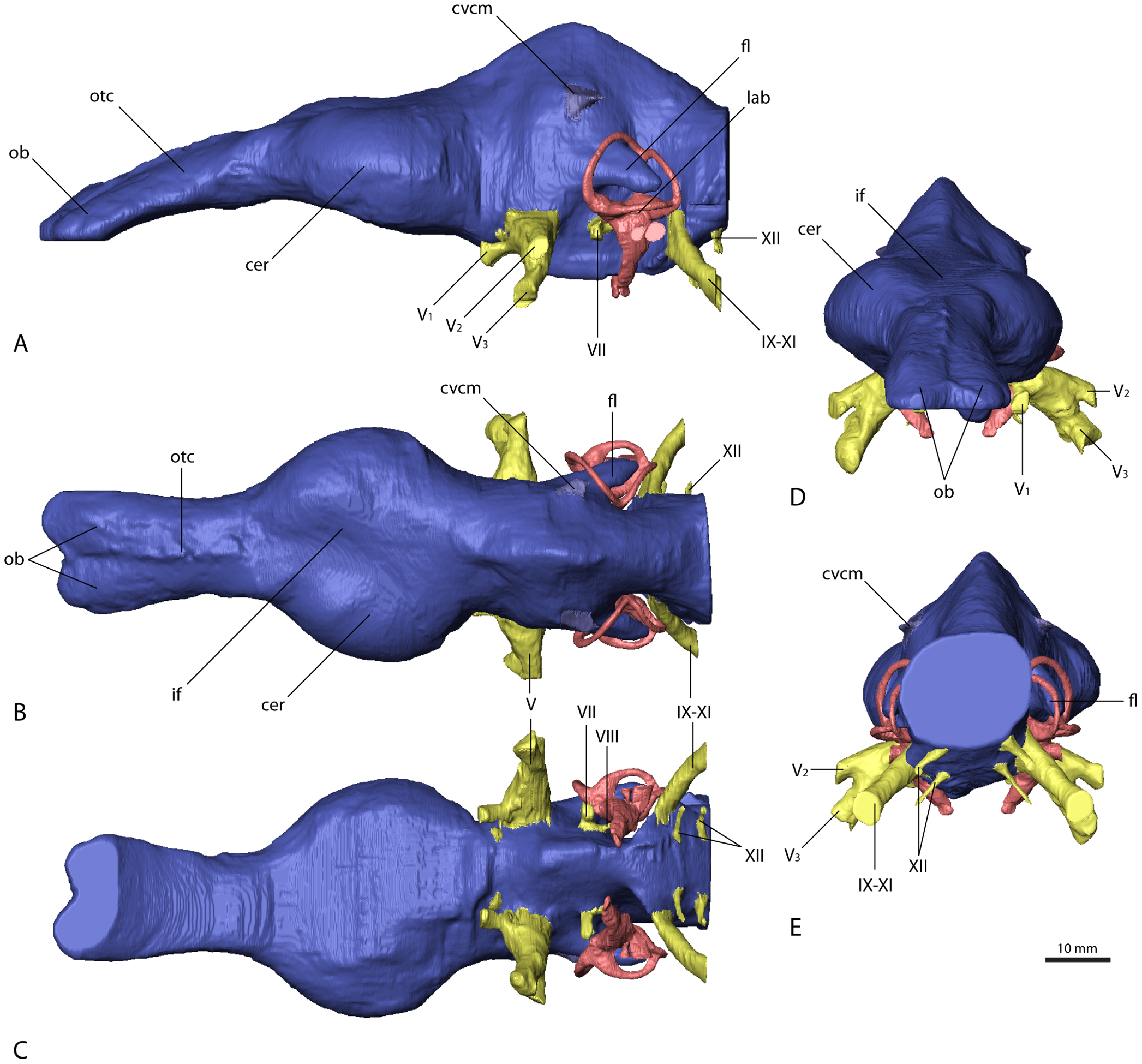
Reconstructed brain of Erlikosaurus

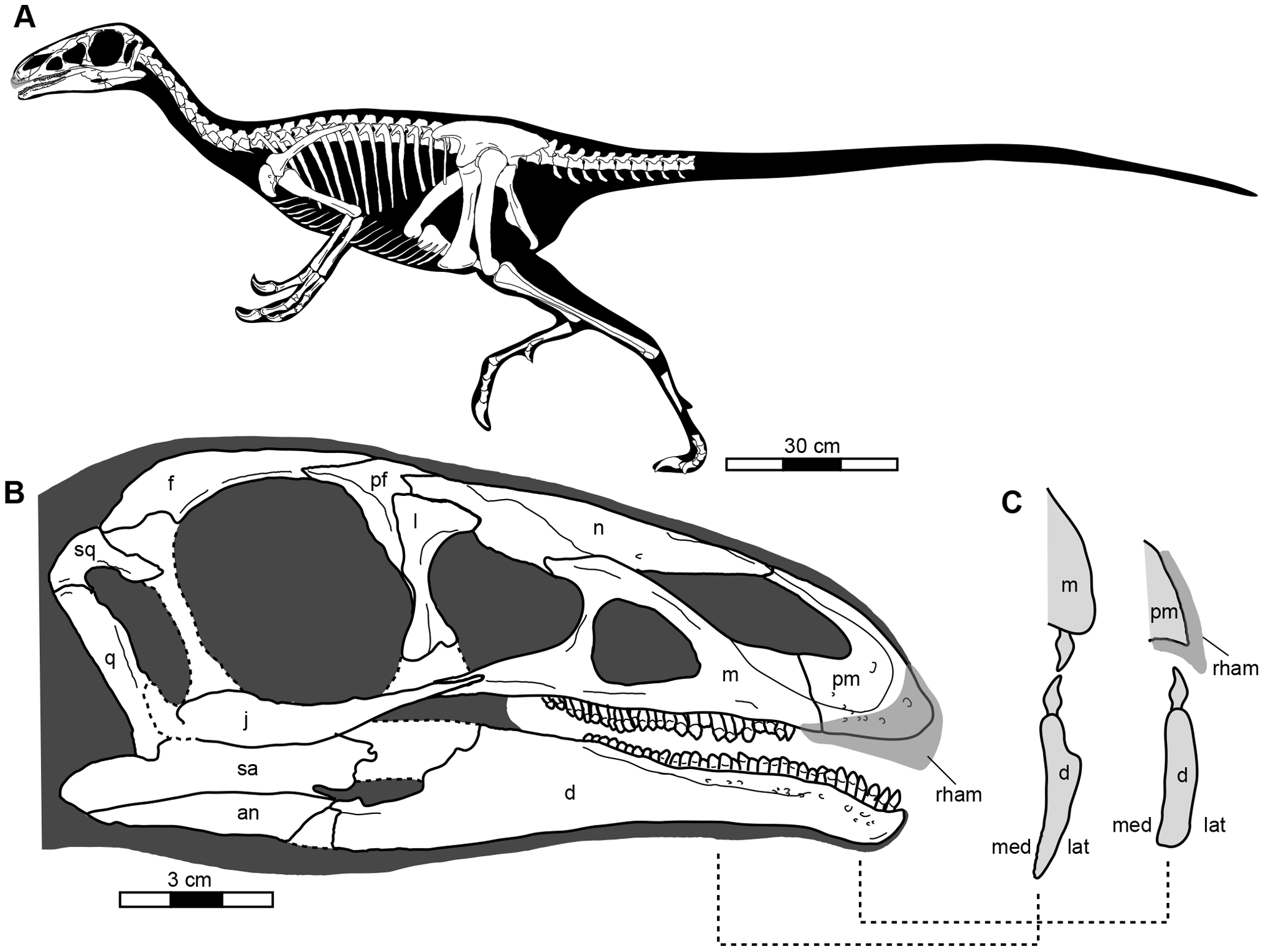
Skeletal restoration of Jianchangosaurus

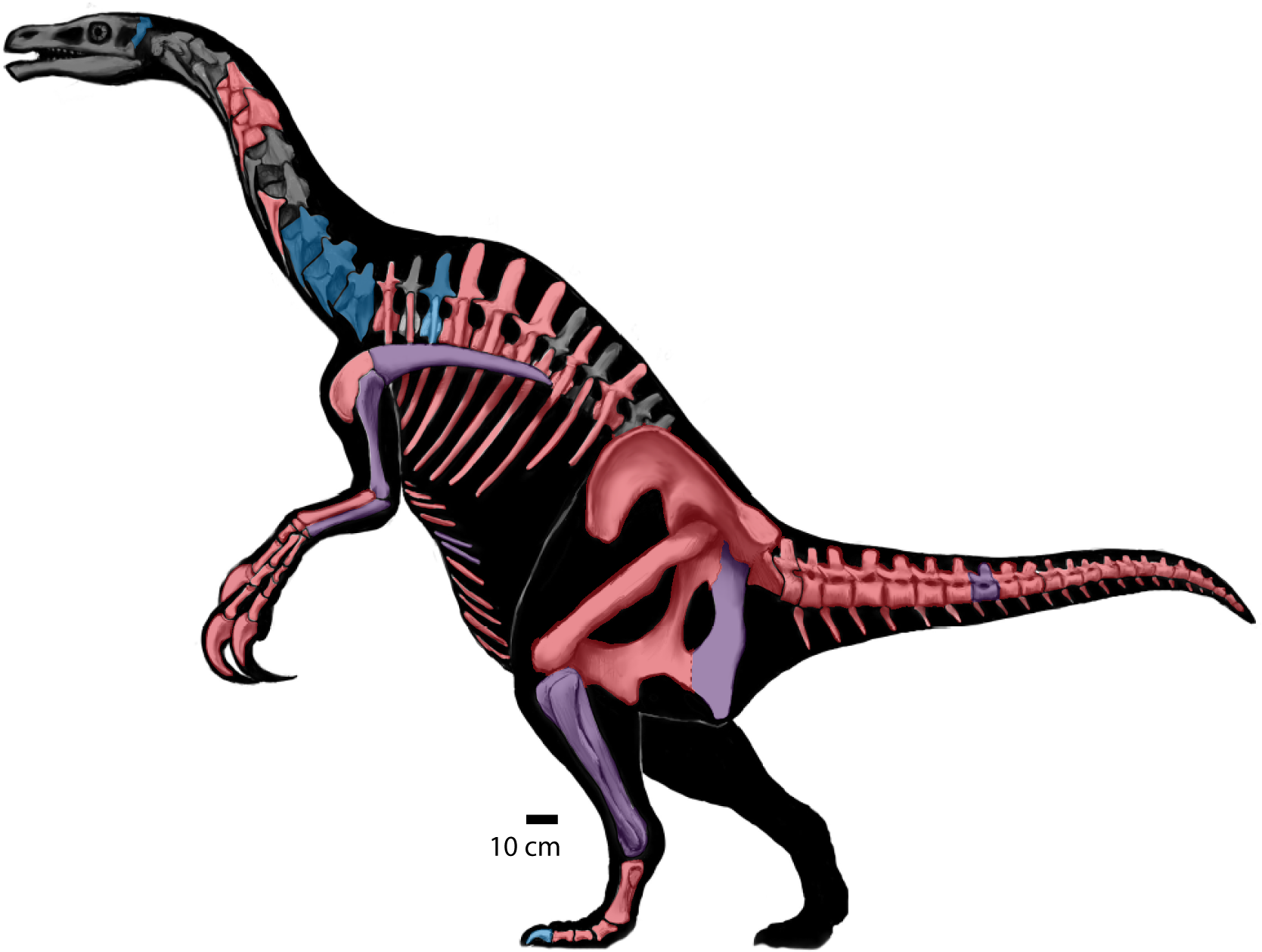
Highlighted remains of N. mckinleyi and N. graffami

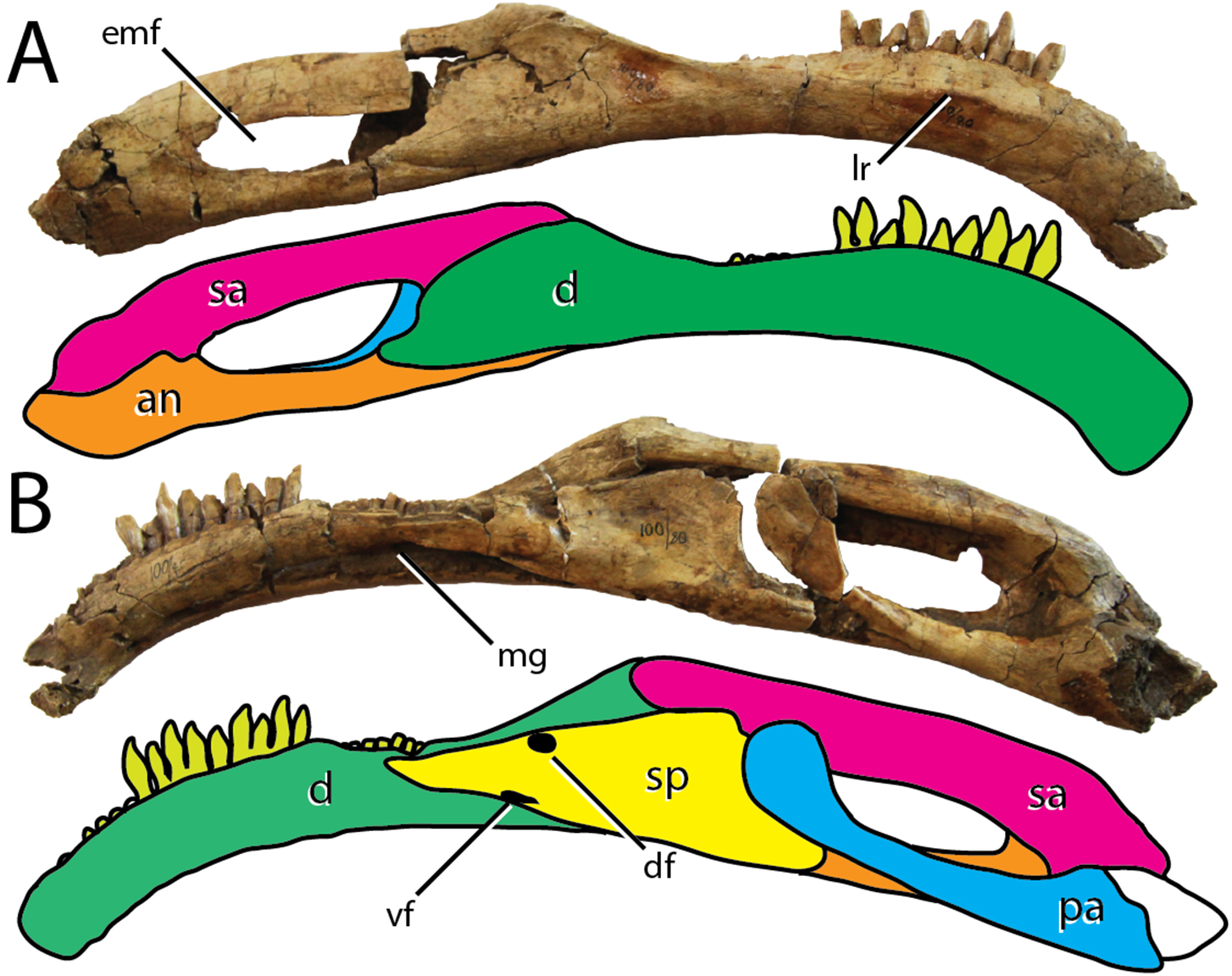
Segnosaurus holotype mandible in lateral and inner views

==== 2012 ====
- Qian and colleagues discussed the affinities of Chilantaisaurus zheziangensis and noted that is actually a therizinosaurid. Tiantaisaurus, a supposedly new therizinosaur, was briefly mentioned but not officially named.
- Lautenschlager with colleagues reconstructed the cranial cavities of Erlikosaurus via CT scans and noted a complex ear and brain structure that may apply to other therizinosaurids.
- Senter with others described the new genus and species Martharaptor greenriverensis.
- Fiorillo and Adams described four-toed footprints from the Cantwell Formation. The morphology is similar to therizinosaurid feet but slightly different from Macropodosaurus. Nevertheless, they attributed these tracks to therizinosaurids.

==== 2013 ====
- Lautenschlager performed digital reconstructions for the cranial musculature in Erlikosaurus and found the bite force of Edmontosaurus being greater than that for the former. The lesser bite force for Erlikosaurus better served in stripping and cropping leaves, rather than active mastication.
- Using the complete holotype skull of Erlikosaurus, Lautenschlager and colleagues noted that the keratinous beak in therizinosaurs and most other beaked theropods was an adaption that might have helped to enhance cranial stability by mitigating the stress and strain experienced by the skull during feeding.
- Pu with colleagues described the new primitive genus and species Jianchangosaurus yixianensis. They regarded this genus along with Falcarius was the most primitive.
- Kobayashi and colleagues reported an exceptional nesting ground site of therizinosaurid dinosaurs at the Javkhlant Formation, which contained at least 17 dendroolithid egg clutches.

==== 2014 ====
- Lautenschlager concluded that the claws of most therizinosaurs were more effective when piercing or pulling down vegetation but not for digging. He could neither confirm nor disregard that the hand claws could have been fully used for sexual display, self-defense, intraspecific competition, mate-gripping during mating or grasping stabilization when foraging.
- Li and colleagues examined numerous dinosaur specimens with preserved integument, and inferred that the specimen BMNHC PH000911 of Beipiaosaurus had a brownish colouration in life.

==== 2015 ====
- The osteology and taphonomy of Nothronychus was fully described by Hedrick and colleagues, providing anatomical considerations for other therizinosaurids.
- David K. Smith reconstructed the cranio-cervical musculature of Falcarius and Nothronychus.
- Kobayashi and team reported a new, two-fingered therizinosaur from the Bayan Shireh Formation that was discovered back in 2012.
- Gierlinski reported Macropodosaurus footprints from Late Cretaceous strata in Poland.

==== 2016 ====
- Zanno with colleagues redescribed the complex lower jaws and dentition of Segnosaurus and noticed a niche partitioning between this taxon and Erlikosaurus.
- Sues and Averianov described extensive remains of therizinosauroid and potentially therizinosaurid remains from the Bissekty Formation.
- Botelho and team considered the feet of therizinosaurids to be plantigrade.

==== 2017 ====
- Lautenschlager concluded the evolutionary trends in jaw mechanics of therizinosaurs suffered a change from higher bite forces and robust lower jaws in early members to lesser ones in derived therizinosaurs.
- Masrour with colleagues reported Macropodosaurus footprints on Cretaceous strata in Morocco.

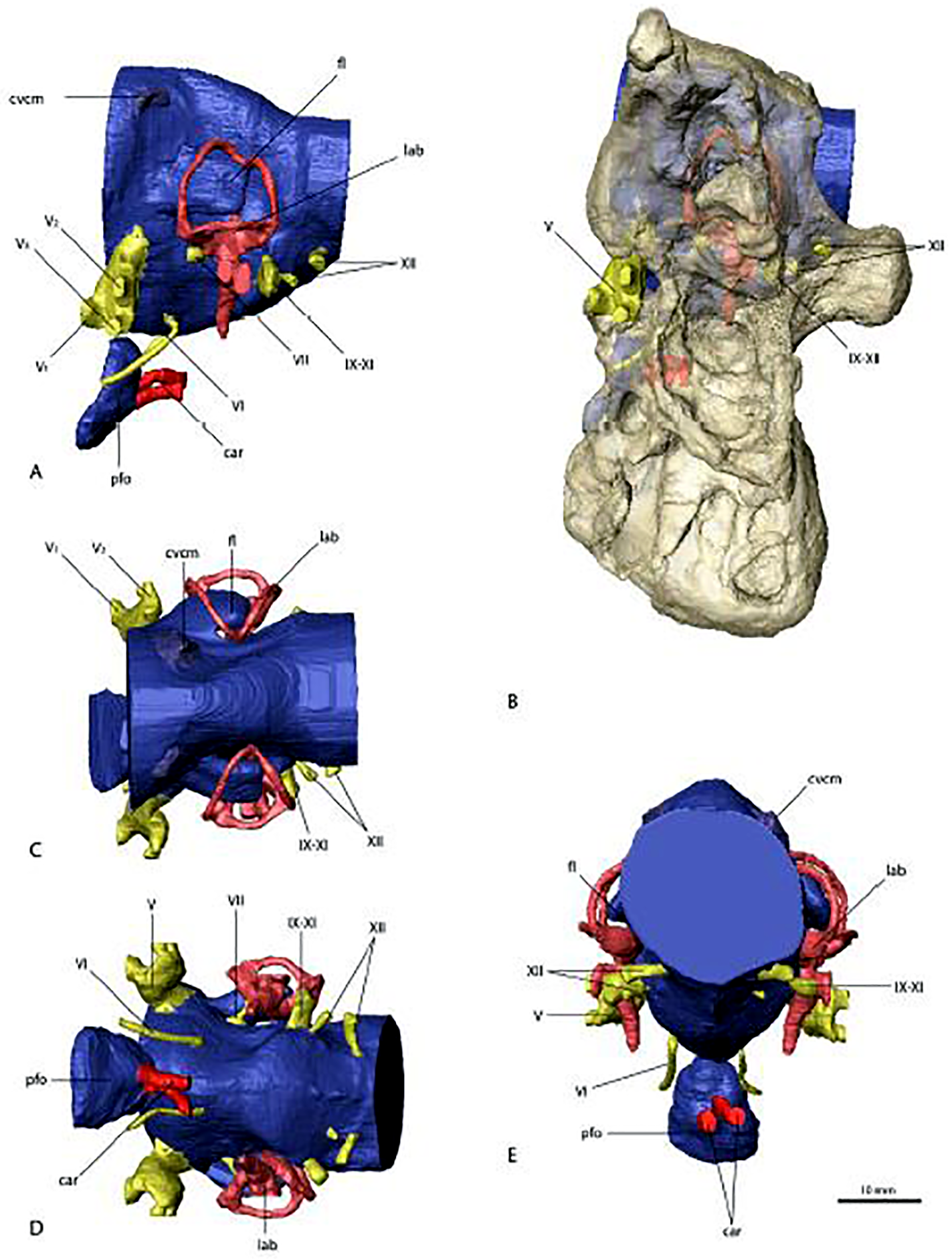
Reconstructed brain of N. mckinleyi

- Khai Button and team examined the dental histology of Falcarius and Suzhousaurus to analyze the dental evolution within Therizinosauria.

==== 2018 ====
- The holotype braincase of Nothronychus mckinleyi was re-analyzed by Smith with colleagues finding similar traits and capacities to Erlikosaurus.
- Fiorillo and team found more therizinosaurid tracks from the Cantwell Formation but this time in association with hadrosaurid footprints. They were the first authors providing photographs of the holotype Erlikosaurus feet.
- McNamara and colleagues discovered the fossilised remains of skin flakes in a specimen of Beipiaosaurus and other numerous feathered dinosaurs from the Jehol Biota using scanning electron microscope on the preserved feather impressions. Comparisons made with extant birds indicate that Beipiaosaurus and other non-avian theropods shed their skin as dandruff, and did not get as warm as modern birds because they were ground-dwelling animals not able to fly.
- Loredana Macaluso and colleagues suggested that the pubic boot of most therizinosaurs was restrained by ventilatory muscles that were crucial for breathing with air sacs.

==== 2019 ====
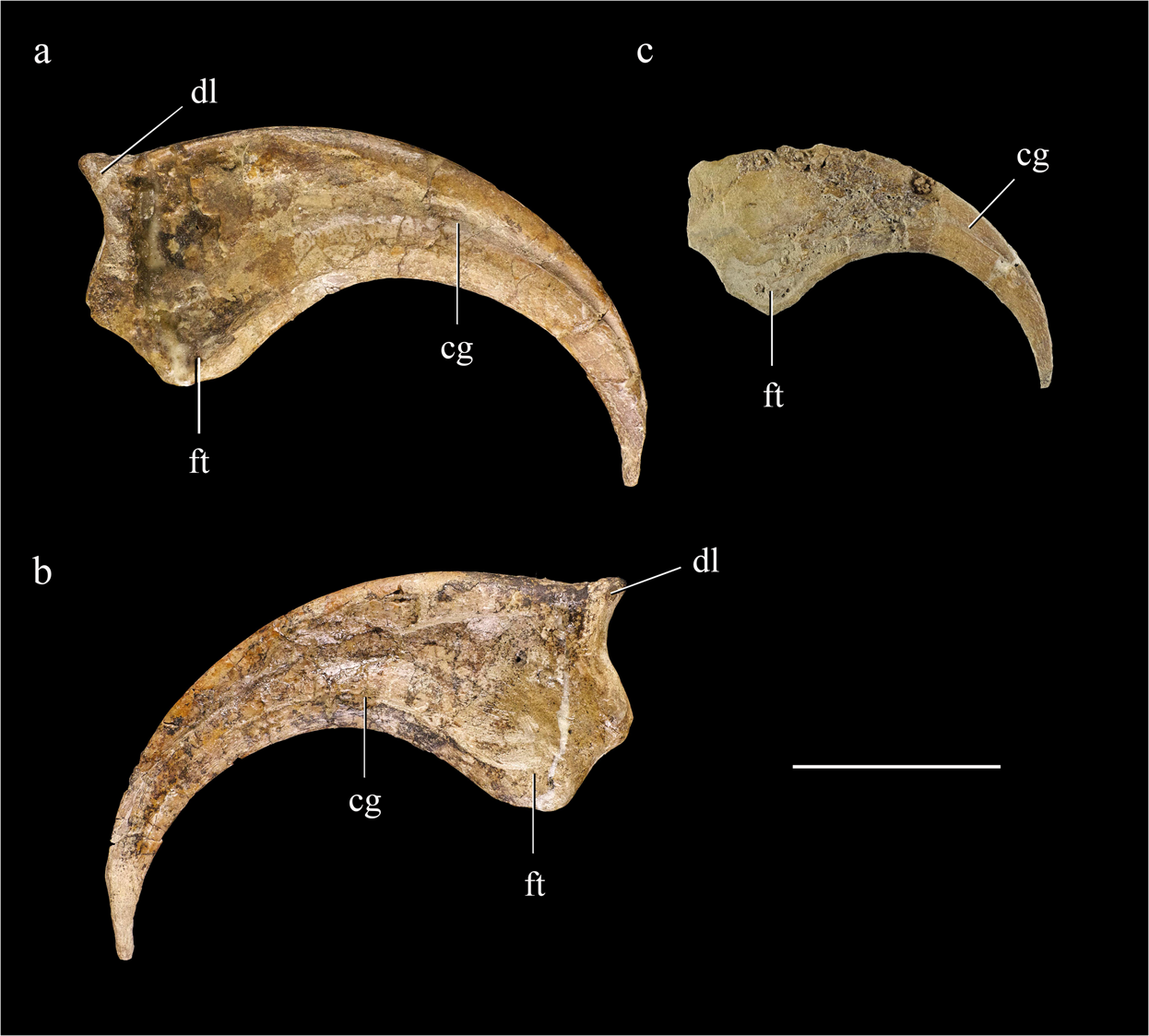
Lingyuanosaurus hand unguals

- Hartman with colleagues performed a large phylogenetic analysis for the Therizinosauria and other theropod groups. This analysis was strongly based on the 2010 work of Zanno.
- Yao and colleagues described the new genus and species Lingyuanosaurus sihedangensis.
- Liao and Xu redescribed the holotype skull of Beipiaosaurus in detail, noting new unique cranial traits for the genus.
- Ali Nabavizadeh concluded that most therizinosaurs were mainly orthal feeders (moving their jaws up and down and not to the sides) and raised their jaws isognathously whereby the upper and lower teeth of each side contacted each other at once.
- Button and Zanno found that Segnosaurus had gracile skulls and relatively low bite forces, indicating a food processing in the gut. Erlikosaurus had features associated with extensive processing such as the lower jaws or dentition and therefore, the food processing was in the mouth.
- The Javkhlant Formation nesting site was formally described in 2019 by Kohei Tanaka and colleagues concluding that egg clutches were covered in organic-rich material during incubation and colonial nesting first evolved in non-avian dinosaur to increase hatching success.

=== 2020s ===
==== 2020 ====
- David K. Smith and colleagues analyzed the vertebral pneumaticity of Nothronychus concluding that it had bird-like unidirectional lungs and abdominal air sacs.

==== 2021 ====
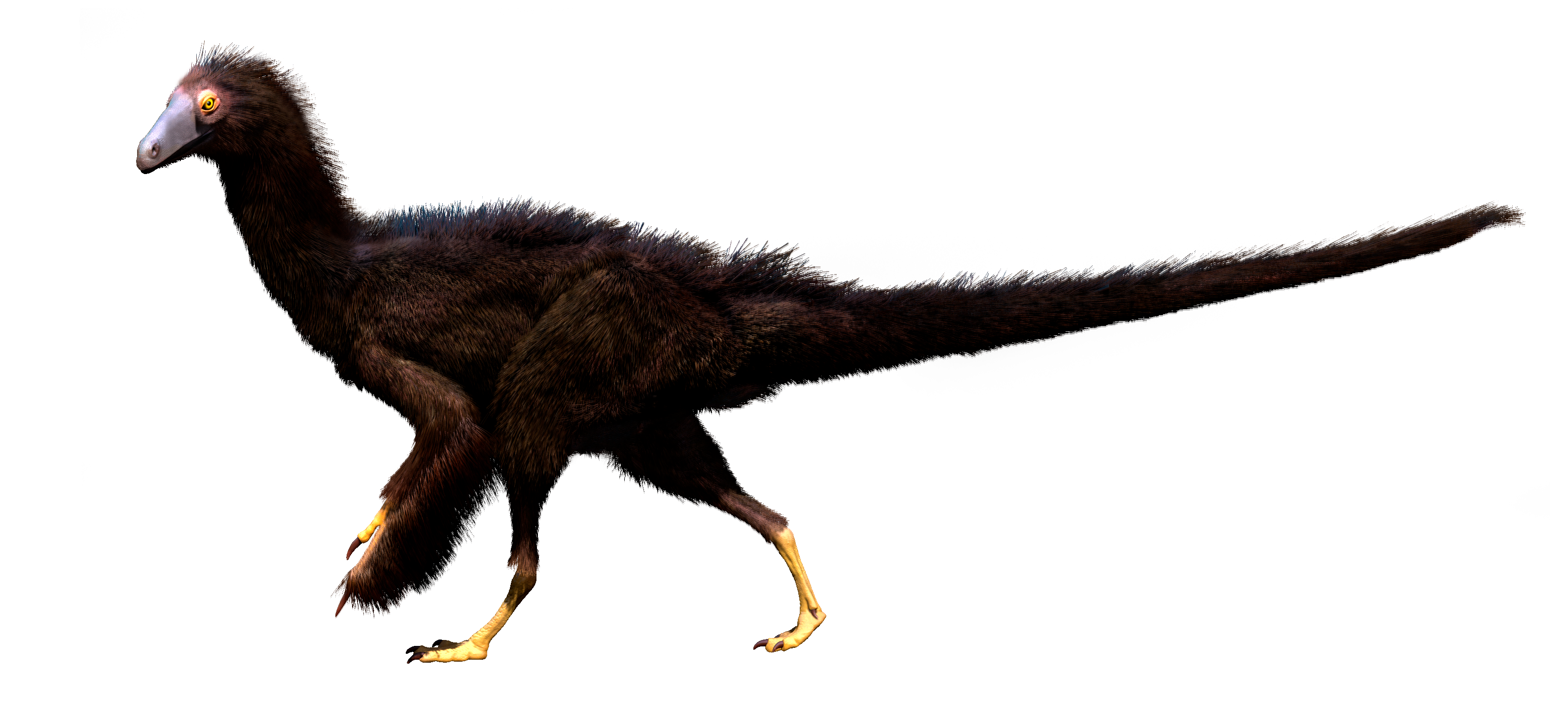
Fukuivenator restored as a primitive therizinosaur

- Smith reconstructed the hindlimb musculature of Nothronychus, noting a convergence with birds and ornithischian dinosaurs.
- Smith reconstructed the forelimb musculature of Nothronychus, discovering similarities with dromaeosaurid muscles and the absence of an increased range of motion within the forelimbs.
- Chun-Chi Liao and colleagues redescribed the holotype of Beipiaosaurus, noting new unique traits for the genus.
- Soki Hattori with colleagues redescribed the holotype of Fukuivenator considering numerous new traits of the genus. The team also recovered the genus as the primitive-most therizinosaur.
- Kundrát and Arthur R. I. Cruickshankb presented evidence that some dendroolithid eggs were laid by a therizinosauroids.
- Sennikov re-analyzed Macropodosaurus and the overall foot anatomy of therizinosaurids, concluding that this group had a plantigrade stance. While ancestral therizinosaurs had a gracile and digitigrade stance, therizinosaurids evolved a robust, ponderous body plan and plantigradism.

==== 2022 ====
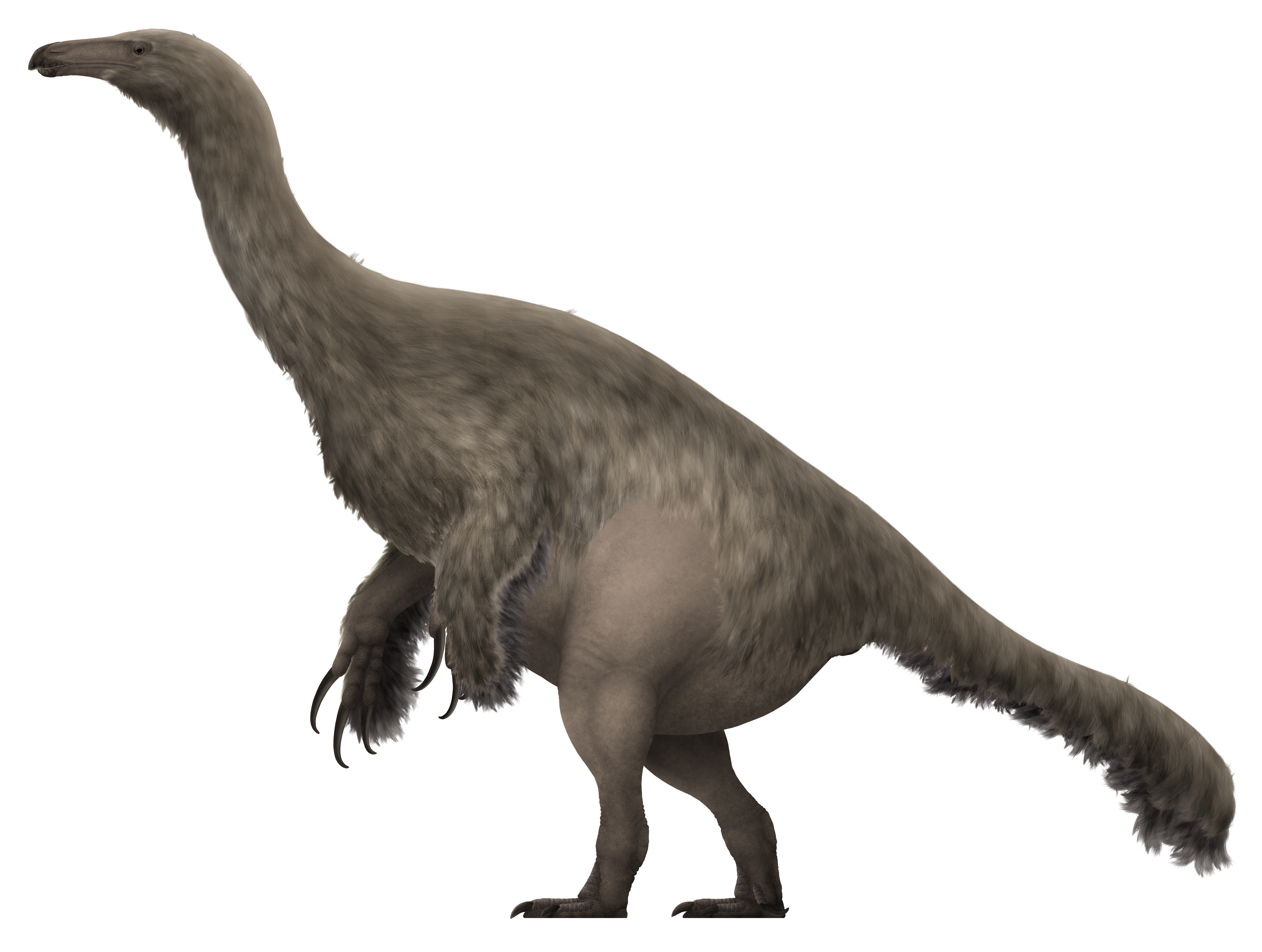
Life reconstruction of Paralitherizinosaurus

- Kobayashi and team named and described the new therizinosaurid Paralitherizinosaurus japonicus from the Osoushinai Formation of Japan. It was mostly similar to Therizinosaurus in manual ungual morphology.

==== 2023 ====
- Zichuan Qin and team examined the manual unguals of therizinosaurs and alvarezsaurs through finite element analysis, concluding that the former group was best suited for herbivory. Special attention was given to Therizinosaurus, noting that its manual unguals became too enlarged to be mechanically functional.
- Smith and David D. Gillette reconstructed the hindlimbs tendon/ligament system of Nothronychus, noting a slow, waddling gait. The co-workers also noted that a plantigrade stance in the group cannot be definitely rejected.
- Smith reconstructed the hindlimb musculature of Falcarius, characterized by a non-waddling gait.
- Simon Wills and colleagues reported the presence of a therizinosaur tooth from the Middle Jurassic Hornsleasow Quarry of the Chipping Norton Limestone Formation.

== See also ==
- History of paleontology
- Timeline of paleontology
