= Celina A. Suarez =

American geologist

Dr. Celina A Suarez
- Born: San Antonio, TX
- Education: Trinity University Temple University University of Kansas Boise State University
- Known for: Research in using trace element and stable isotope geochemistry of fossil vertebrates and invertebrates to understand paleoecology, paleoclimatology, and taphonomy of ancient terrestrial ecosystems.
- Relatives: Sister- Dr. Marina Suarez

Celina A. Suarez is an American geologist. She is known for her research on using trace element and stable isotope geochemistry of fossil vertebrates and invertebrates to understand paleoecology, paleoclimatology, and taphonomy of ancient terrestrial ecosystems. She is an associate profession in the Department of Geosciences at the University of Arkansas. The dinosaur Geminiraptor suarezarum is named after Suarez and her twin sister, Marina Suarez, co-discovers of the site on which it was found.

== Biography ==
Suarez was born and raised in San Antonio, Texas. Growing up, Suarez and her identical twin sister, Marina Suarez, would use their father's tools to dig holes in their backyard in a quest to find dinosaur bones.

Suarez earned a Bachelor of Science in geosciences at Trinity University in 2003. In 2005, she earned a master's degree in geology at Temple University. She continued her education at the University of Kansas, and earned a PhD in geology in 2010. Then afterword, she did a National Science Foundation (NSF) Postdoctoral Fellowship at Boise State University in 2011, at which she "used rare earth elements, stable isotopes, and infrared spectroscopy to understand bone preservation and diagenesis."

== Career ==
In 2004, Suarez and her sister, Marina (both Temple University master's students at the time), found a collection of bones while working on an excavation project in Utah. Researchers identified that the bones came from at least three different dinosaur species, including one previously undiscovered species. In 2011, the new species, Geminiraptor suarezarum, was named after the twins.

Suarez is as an associate professor at the University of Arkansas, in the Department of Geology. Her current research is based on "Deep-time Paleoclimate." There are many facilities that she and her lab group use for their research. One is the U of A Stable Isotope Laboratory, which is able to analyze light isotopes of organics, carbonates, phosphates, and waters. Another is the Trace Element and Radiogenic Isotope Laboratory.

== Awards ==
Suarez won a $478,000 Faculty Early Career Development award — also known as a CAREER award — from the National Science Foundation to support her research in paleoclimatology. In 2016, she was awarded the Deep Carbon Observatory Diversity Grant by the American Geosciences Institute.

In 2019, Suarez received the OMNI Keeling/Hansen Climate Science Award, a faculty award in the J. William Fulbright College of Arts and Sciences at the University of Arkansas to "promote successful climate science research conducted by Fulbright College faculty and students in developing knowledge of the causes and impacts of global climate change, and in developing tangible solutions to mitigate global climate change and its deleterious effects on humanity and global ecosystems."

== Selected works ==
1. Suarez, C.A. Morschhauser, E.M., Suarez, M.B., You, H-L, Li, D-Q, and Dodson, P. (2018) Rare earth element geochemistry of bone beds from the Early Cretaceous Zhonggou Formation of Gansu Province, China: Journal of Vertebrate Paleontology.
2. Suarez, C.A., Knobbe, T., Crowley, J.L., Kirkland, J.I., and Milner, A.R.C (2017) A chronostratigraphic assessment of the Moenave Formation, USA using C-isotope chemostratigraphy, and detrital zircon geochronology: implications for the terrestrial end Triassic extinction: Earth and Planetary Science Letters, v. 475, p. 83-93.
3. Suarez, C.A., You, H-L, Suarez, M.B., Li, D-Q, and Trieschmann, J.B. (2017) Stable isotopes reveal rapid enamel elongation (amelogenesis) rates for the Early Cretaceous iguanodontian dinosaur Lanzhousaurus magnidens: Scientific Reports, 7:15319.
4. Suarez, C.A., Flaig, P.P., Ludvigson, G.A., González, L.A., Tian, R., Zhou, H., McCarthy, P.J., Van der Kolk, D.A. and Fiorillo, A.R. (2016) Reconstructing the paleohydrology of a cretaceous Alaskan paleopolar coastal plain from stable isotopes of bivalves: Palaeogeography, Palaeoclimatology, Palaeoecology, v. 441, p. 339-351
5. Suarez, C.A., Gonzalez, L.A., Ludvigson, G.A., Kirkland, J.I., Cifelli, R.L. and Kohn M.J. (2014) Multi-taxa isotopic investigation of paleohydrology in the Lower Cretaceous Cedar Mountain Formation, Eastern Utah: deciphering effects of the Nevadaplano Plateau on regional climate: Journal of Sedimentary Research. v. 84, p. 975–987.
6. Suarez, C.A., Ludvigson, G.A., Gonzalez, L.A., Fiorillo, A.R., Flaig, P.P. and McCarthy, P.J. (2013) Use of multiple oxygen isotope proxies for elucidating Arctic Cretaceous Palaeo-hydrology: in Isotopic Studies in Cretaceous Research, Bojar, A.-V., Melomte-Dobrinescu, M.C. & Smit, J. (eds), Geological Society of London, Special Publications, v. 382, p. 185–202.
7. Suarez, C.A., González, L.A., Ludvigson, G.A., Cifelli, R.L. and Tremain, E. (2012) Water utilization of the Cretaceous Mussentuchit local fauna, Cedar Mountain Formation, UT, USA: documentation of terrestrial water reservoirs: Palaeogeography, Palaeoclimatology, Palaeoecology, v. 313, p. 78–92.
8. Suarez, C.A., Macpherson, G.L., González, L.A., and Grandstaff, D.E. (2010) Heterogeneous rare earth element (REE) patterns and concentrations in a fossil bone as determined by LAM-ICP-MS analysis: implications for the use of REE in vertebrate taphonomy and fossilization history: Geochimica et Cosmochimica Acta. v. 74, p. 2970–2988.
9. Suarez, C.A., Suarez. M., Terry, D.O. Jr., and Grandstaff, D.E. (2007) Rare earth element geochemistry and taphonomy of the Early Cretaceous Crystal Geyser Dinosaur Quarry, east-central Utah: PALAIOS,
