= Maleev =

Maleev (Bulgarian: Малеев) a Slavic surname. Notable people with the surname include:

== Maleev ==
- Alex Maleev, Bulgarian comic book artist
- Evgeny Maleev (1915–1966), Russian paleontologist

== Maleeva ==
- The Maleeva sisters:
  - Katerina Maleeva (born 1969), Bulgarian tennis player
  - Magdalena Maleeva (born 1975), Bulgarian tennis player
  - Manuela Maleeva (born 1967), Bulgarian tennis player

== See also ==
- Yulia Berberian-Maleeva (born 1944), Bulgarian tennis player
- Maleevus, dinosaur
