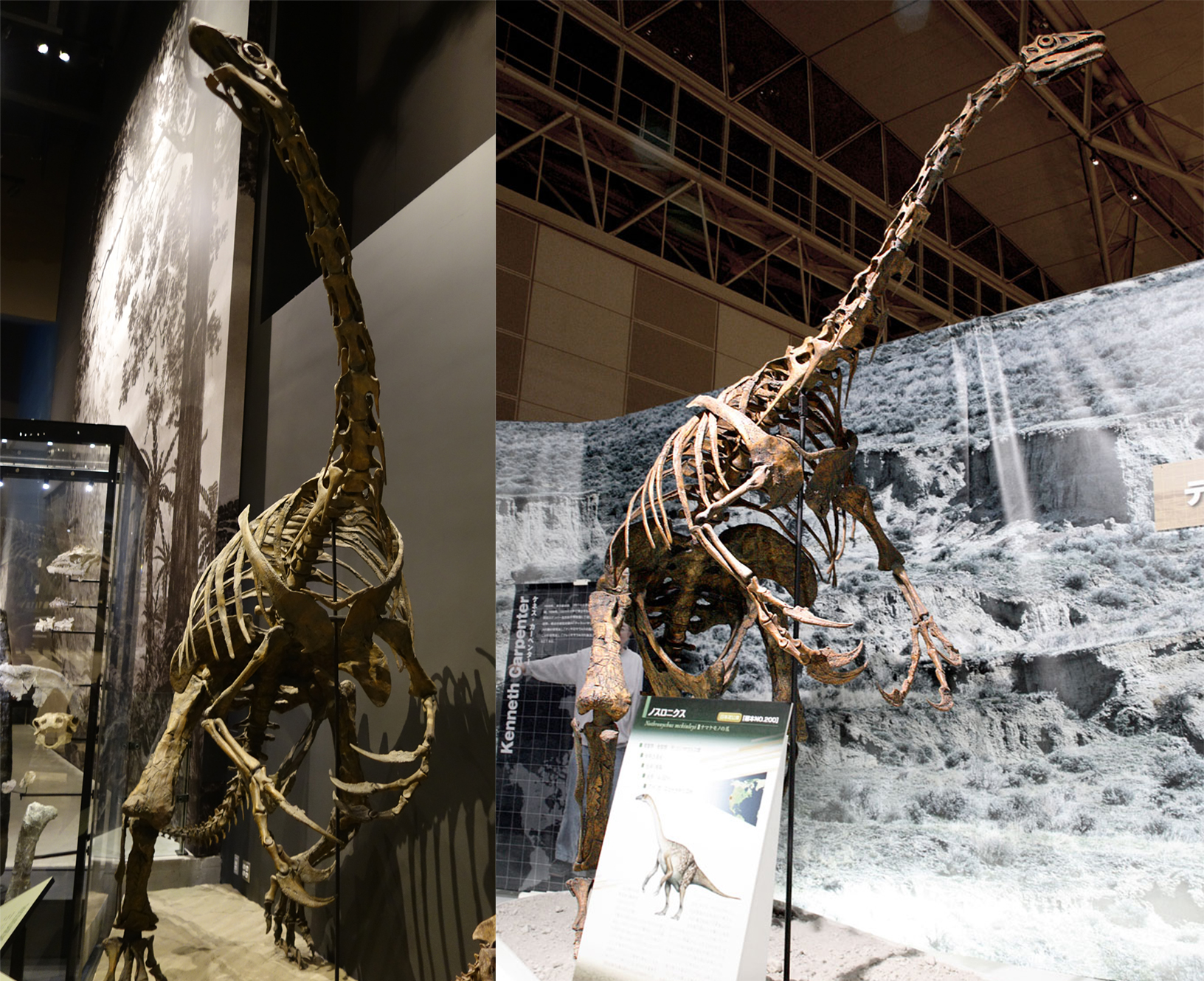
- Mounted skeletons of Nothronychus mckinleyi and N. graffami

Scientific classification
- Kingdom: Animalia
- Phylum: Chordata
- Class: Reptilia
- Clade: Dinosauria
- Clade: Saurischia
- Clade: Theropoda
- Clade: Maniraptora
- Clade: †Therizinosauria
- Superfamily: †Therizinosauroidea
- Family: †Therizinosauridae; Maleev, 1954

Type species
- †Therizinosaurus cheloniformis Maleev, 1954

Genera
- †Duonychus; †Erliansaurus; †Erlikosaurus; †Nanshiungosaurus; †Neimongosaurus; †Nothronychus; †Paralitherizinosaurus; †Segnosaurus; †Suzhousaurus?; †Therizinosaurus

Synonyms
- Segnosauridae Perle, 1979; Enigmosauridae Barsbold, 1983; Erlikosauridae Ryan & Rusell, 2001; Nanshiungosauridae Dong & You, 1997

= Therizinosauridae =

Therizinosaurids Temporal range: Late Cretaceous

Extinct family of dinosaurs

Therizinosauridae (meaning 'scythe lizards') is an extinct family of therizinosauroid dinosaurs whose fossil remains have been found in mostly Late Cretaceous boundary. Even though representative fossils have only been found throughout Asia and North America, the range of Therizinosauridae is believed to have spanned much of the supercontinent of Laurasia based on several footprints and isolated remains in Europe and Africa. As of 2025, the family Therizinosauridae comprises nine definitive genera.

Therizinosauridae was named in 1954 by paleontologist Evgeny Maleev after the large, claw-bearing unguals of the type species Therizinosaurus cheloniformis. Therizinosaurids were generally large and very robustly built animals that had a near convergent body plan with the more recent (and also extinct) ground sloths. The largest genera of the group are Therizinosaurus and Segnosaurus, which were about 10 m (33 ft) and 7 m (23 ft) long, respectively. The physiology of therizinosaurids include a broad and rounded belly supported by a wide and robust pelvis with thick hind-limbs composed of very stout, four-toed feet, a strong arm build with enhanced hand flexibility, elongated hand claws, and a highly derived, nearly avian inner-ear. Traits that are also well-known include an elongated neck, a prominent keratinous beak and a prosauropod-like dentition that differs from all theropods. Primitive therizinosaurs (Beipiaosaurus or Jianchangosaurus) are estimated to have had less advanced feathers in comparison to more recent therizinosaurids.

The unique and bizarre features of the group have encouraged research into the paleobiology and paleoecology of the family. A fair portion of modern research has concentrated on the feeding-patterns of these dinosaurs, as they are considered to be the best regarded theropod candidates for herbivory. While other theropod groups are fully carnivorous, members of Therizinosauridae diverged and adopted an herbivorous and possibly omnivorous lifestyle. This is even more supported by their unusual morphology. As indicated by their feet morphology and several footprints from Asia, Africa and Europe, they probably were plantigrade walkers, but further examination may be required. Therizinosaurids were oviparous animals that nested in colonies and laid egg clutches. In fact, therizinosaur eggs are particularly common in Late Cretaceous formations, mainly in Asia. The oofamily Dendroolithidae is often attributed to therizinosaur-grade dinosaurs. Some of the first dendroolithid eggs were found on the Bayan Shireh and Nanchao formations.

Their relationships were confusing and obscure on the early years of research mainly because of the unusual traits among members. Several alternative classifications were proposed (such as the naming of Segnosauridae in 1979) until more complete specimens and other taxa were described during the 1990s, which confirmed them as theropods. Many of the shared characters within the group also showed that Segnosauridae was a junior synonym of the much earlier family Therizinosauridae. The current phylogenetic consensus is that therizinosaurids evolved from small, bird-like maniraptorans, and thus they fall within the coelurosaurian clade called Maniraptora. Moreover, most of the traits of therizinosaurids (such as the ear structure) were inherited by smaller, agile, carnivorous ancestors. Extensive phylogenetic analyses have concluded that within Maniraptora, therizinosaurs were the first of five major groups to diverge.

== History of discovery ==
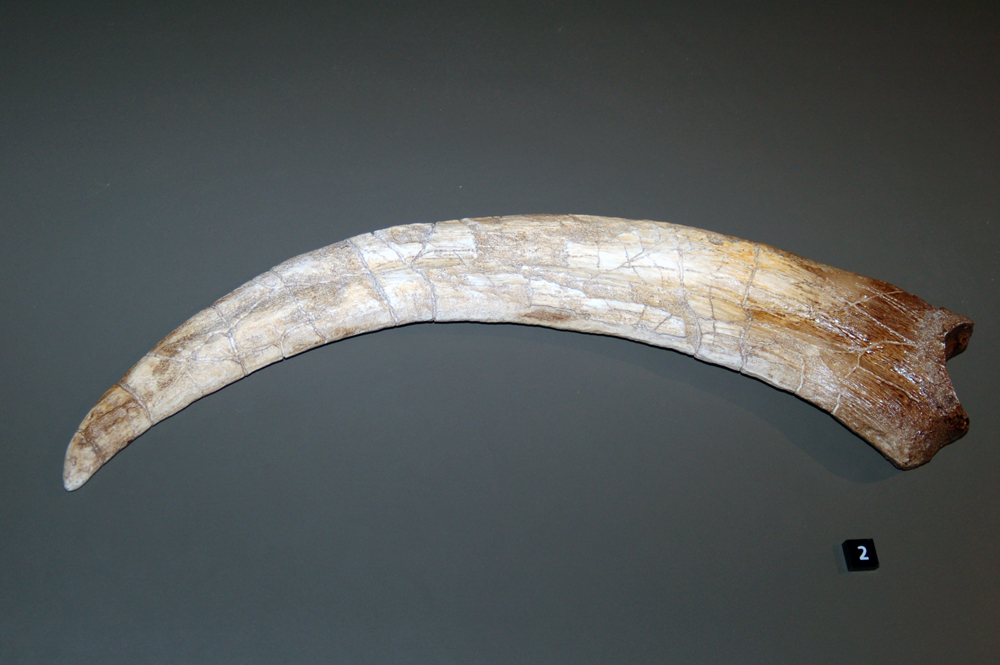
Holotype claw cast of Therizinosaurus (PIN 551–483)

The first definitive therizinosaurid discovered was Therizinosaurus. The fossil remains were discovered in 1918 during Mongolian field expedition on the Nemegt Formation of the Gobi Desert. Several claws were unearthed by the team and later described by the Soviet paleontologist Evgeny Maleev in 1954. The claws were unusually large, approximately 1 m (3.3 ft) long if restored, very straight and flattened. Maleev considered that the claws belonged to a giant marine turtle and named the new genus and species Therizinosaurus cheloniformis, also erecting the Therizinosauridae to include the new species.

In the 1970s more findings were made including the naming of more taxa. Additional specimens of Therizinosaurus were referred by the Mongolian paleontologist Rinchen Barsbold in 1976. He described a set of partial arms from the Nemegt Formation and given the similarities within the claws, he referred this specimen to the genus. The Mongolian paleontologist Altangerel Perle described and named the new genus Segnosaurus in 1979, based on lower jaws and much of the hindlimbs. He also coined the newer Segnosauridae (now synonym of Therizinosauridae) to contain this species. In the same year, paleontologist Dong Zhiming described the genus Nanshiungosaurus, but wrongly interpreted the remains to have pertained to some kind of dwarf sauropod. In the following year, Barsbold and Perle coined the family Segnosauria (now Therizinosauria) to contain the Segnosauridae and kin. Also, they named and briefly described Erlikosaurus, a new genus smaller than Segnosaurus. Confusingly, Perle redescribed Erlikosaurus treating the taxon as a new genus and species in 1981. Also, Perle described another specimen of Therizinosaurus in 1982, this time a partial hind limb. He referred the hindlimb to the genus based on the similarities with Segnosaurus.

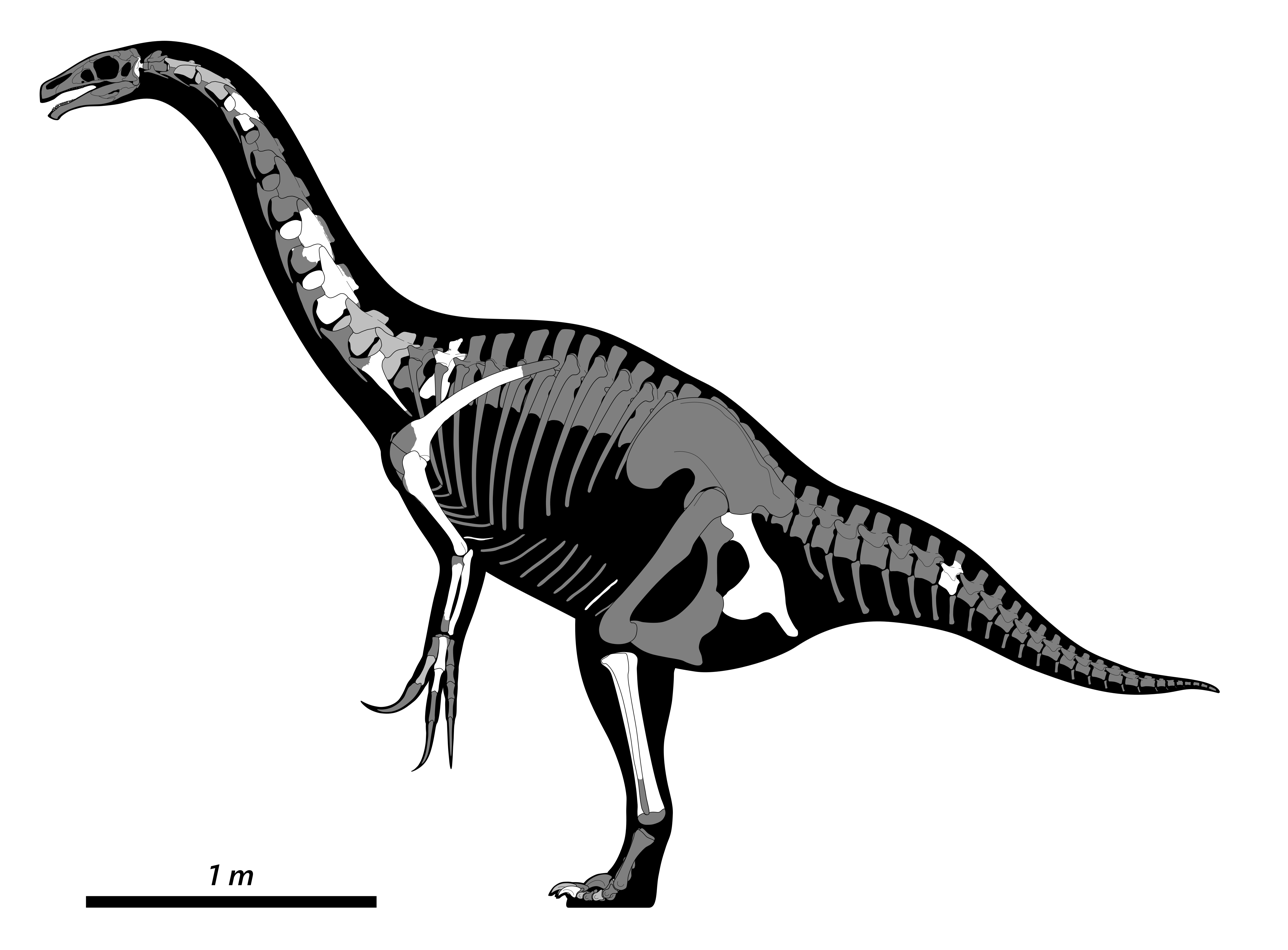
Skeletal reconstruction of Nothronychus mckinleyi

In 2001, the new therizinosaurids Neimongosaurus and Nothronychus (N. mckinleyi) were described and named, and in the following year Erliansaurus was also described and named. Although a new species of Nothronychus (N. graffami) was named in 2009. With this, both species make Nothronychus the most complete therizinosaurid known.

== Description ==
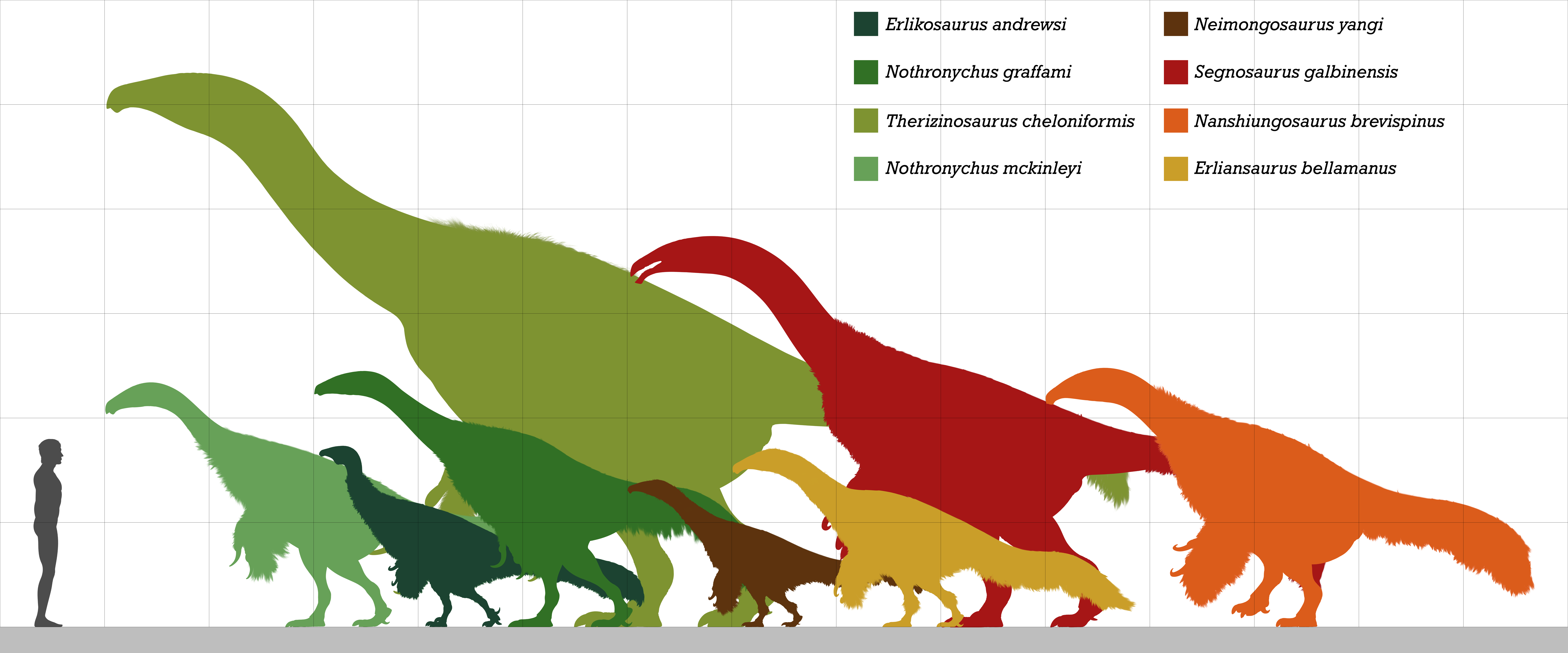
Size of several therizinosaurid species compared to a human

Therizinosaurids were quite advanced and robustly-built animals that reached multi-ton dimensions, making them among the largest maniraptorans. The smallest known therizinosaurids are Erliansaurus, Erlikosaurus and Neimongosaurus which were around 3–4 m (9.8–13.1 ft) long, furthermore the holotype skull of Erlikosaurus is about 25 cm (250 mm). Segnosaurus and the possible therizinosaurid Suzhousaurus were about the same size, 6–7 m (20–23 ft) in length and weighing 1.3 t (2,900 lb). Slightly smaller members are represented by Nanshiungosaurus and Nothronychus, estimated at 5–5.3 m (16–17 ft) long and 600–1,000 kg (0.60–1.00 t) in weight, respectively. The related "Nanshiungosaurus" bohlini was similar in size (about 6 m (20 ft) long), however, its assignment to Nanshiungosaurus is unlikely and it may or not represent another species or specimen of the better known Suzhousaurus. Therizinosaurus were the largest representatives, reaching the top dimensions of the group, they grew up to 10 m (33 ft) long weighing over 5 t (11,000 lb). These dimensions that make the genus among the largest-known theropods. The exponential sizes obtained across the Therizinosauridae appear to have been triggered by the bulk and specialized diet within the group and early members of the Therizinosauria.

Skin impressions from Beipiaosaurus and Jianchangosaurus indicate that primitive therizinosaurs were covered with a coat of down-like, sparse feathers similar to those seen in the compsognathid Sinosauropteryx, as well as longer, simpler, quill-like feathers that may have been used in display. However, while the earliest known example of primitive, stage-I feathers are found among early therizinosaurs, more advanced members are thought to have possessed more developed, avian-like feathers. Although typically associated with flight, the feathers which covered these animals were not used for that purpose. Instead, they assisted in either metabolism or display.

=== Skull ===
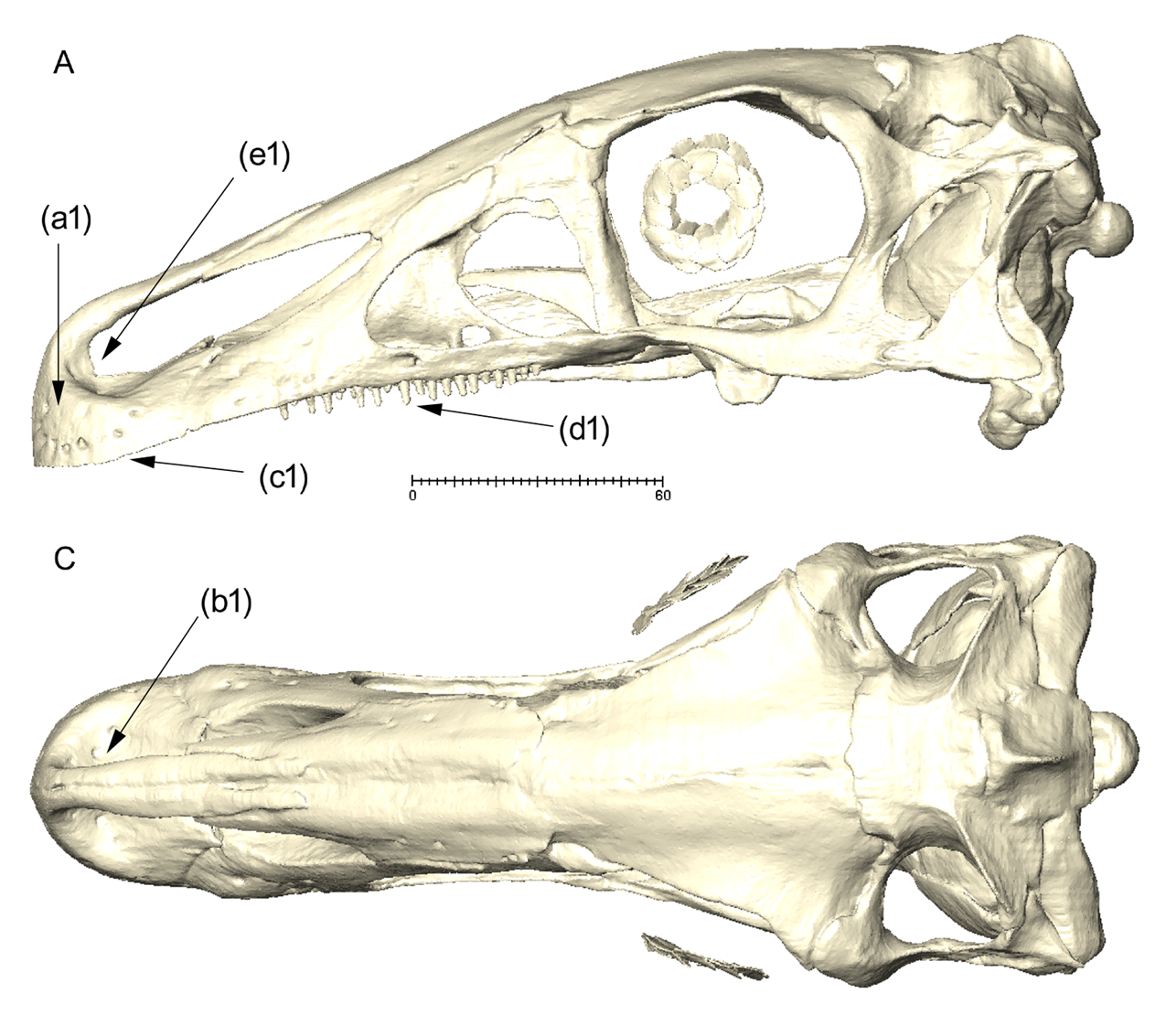
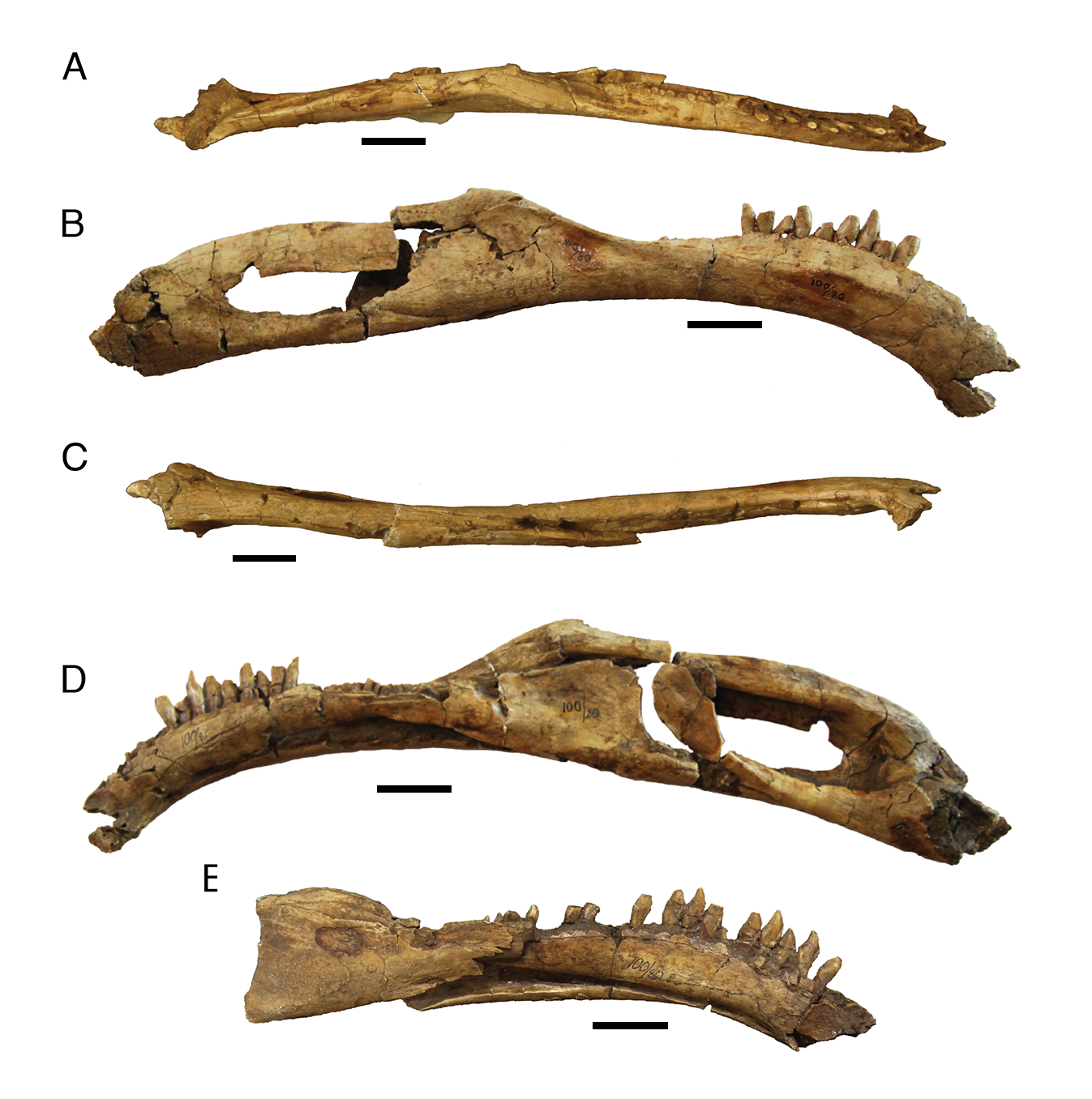
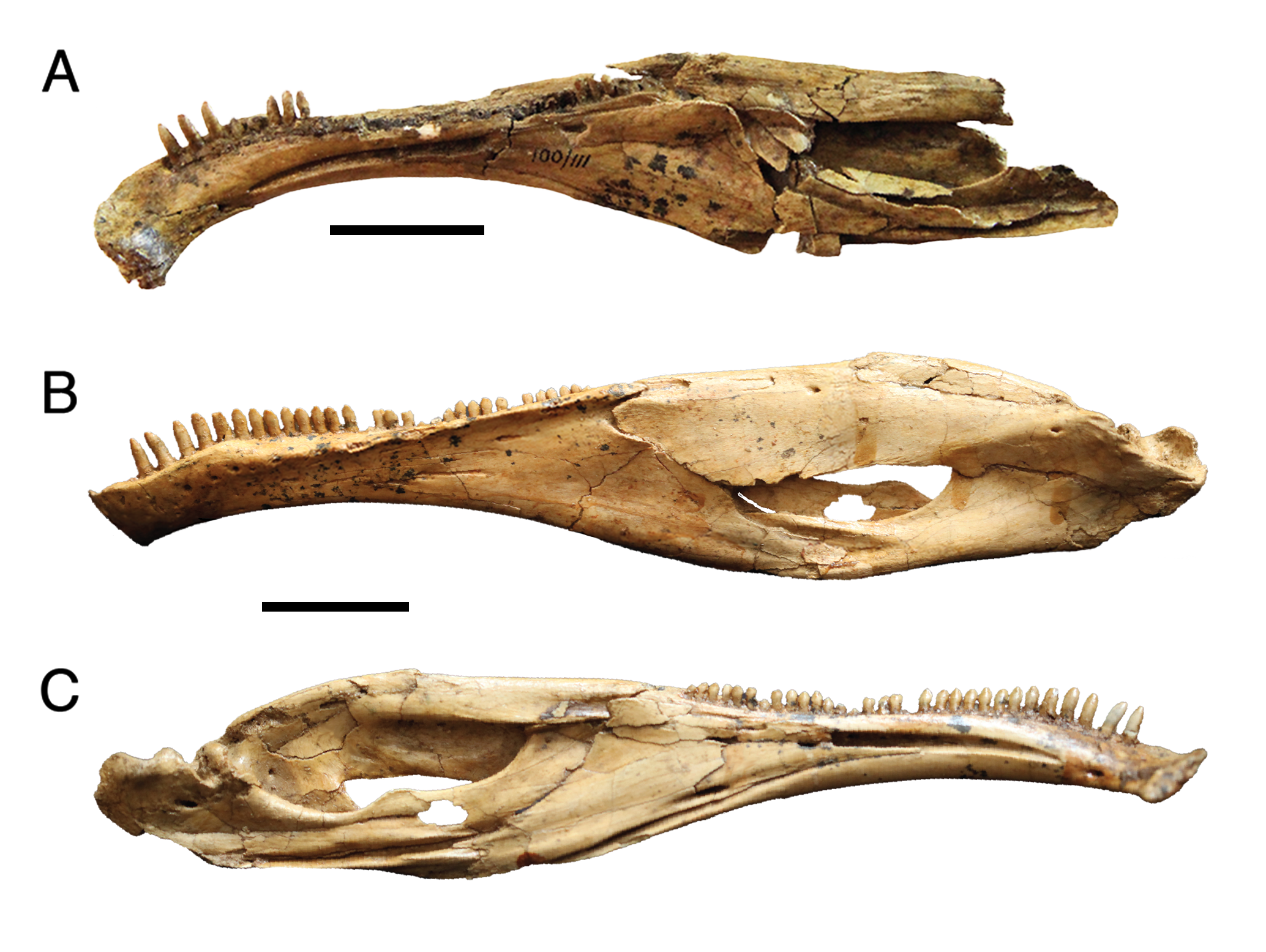
Cranium of Erlikosaurus and hemimandibles from Segnosaurus and Erlikosaurus

Therizinosaurids had more specialized skulls compared to primitive members such as Falcarius, which had a generalist, beak-less snout. They had relatively elongated snouts and the tip was covered with a rhamphotheca (keratinous beak) used during feeding. Although the extension of the beak on the dorsal surface of the snout is unknown, it is estimated that it slightly overlapped the nasal cavity as in some modern-day birds. The dentary (lower jaw) also developed a rhamphotheca, seen on the edentulous (without teeth) anterior-most end. This extension was supplied by neurovascular foramina (small pits) found on the lateral surfaces. The known specimens of the therizinosaurids Erlikosaurus, Neimongosaurus and Segnosaurus preserve numerous neurovascular foramina (more notorious on Erlikosaurus), indicating that a well-developed beak was present in life. Both maxilla and premaxilla were toothed and some species of therizinosaurids had specialized, recurved dentaries such as Segnosaurus and possibly Neimongosaurus. Braincases are known from three therizinosaurids: Erlikosaurus, Neimongosaurus and N. mckinleyi. Unfortunately, the braincase of Neimongosaurus has not been described nor illustrated. The braincases are directed to the bottom, co-ossified with well-developed sideways oriented paroccipital projections, highly pneumatized and had a prominent central foramen.

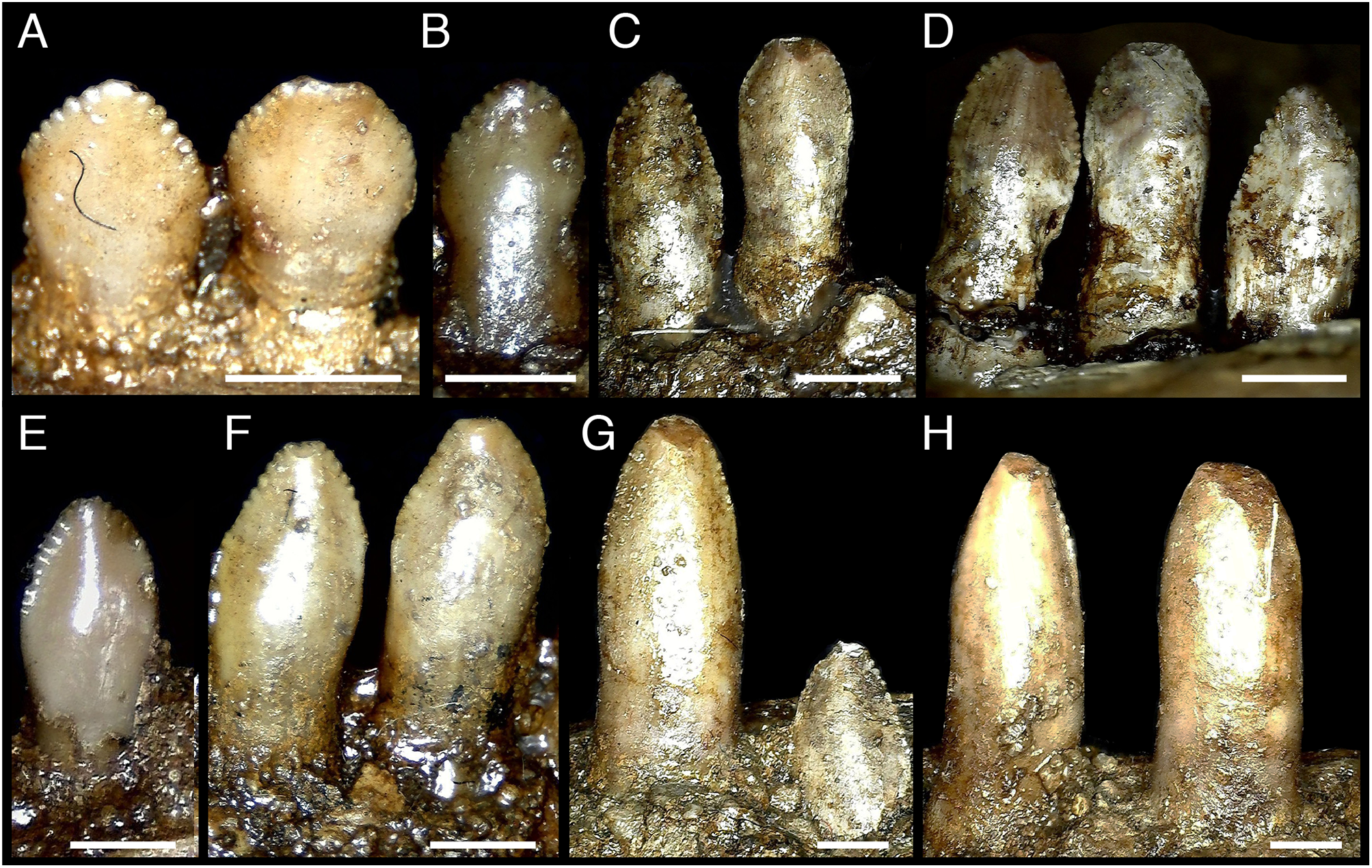
Erlikosaurus dentary teeth

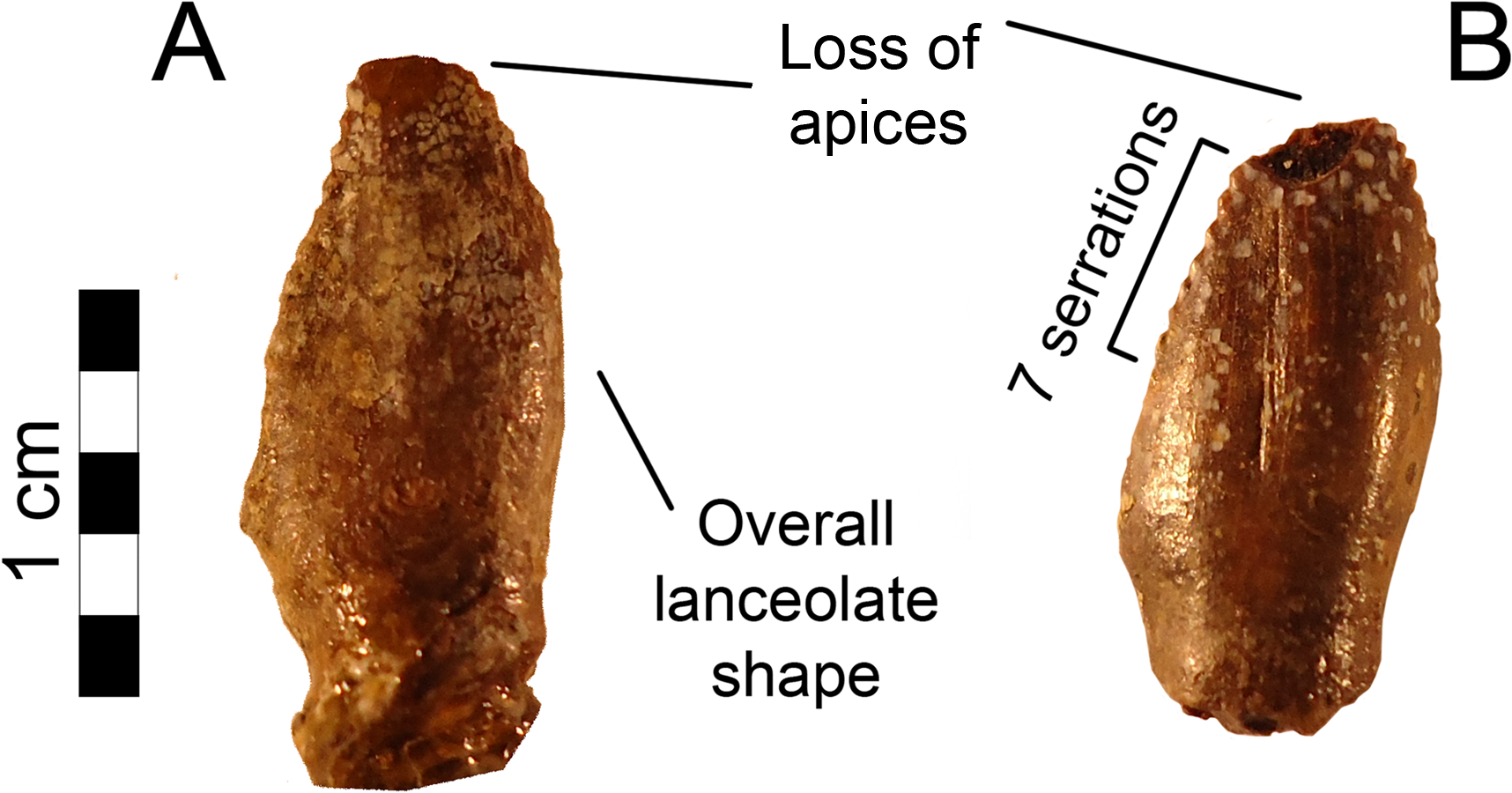
Nothronychus dentary teeth

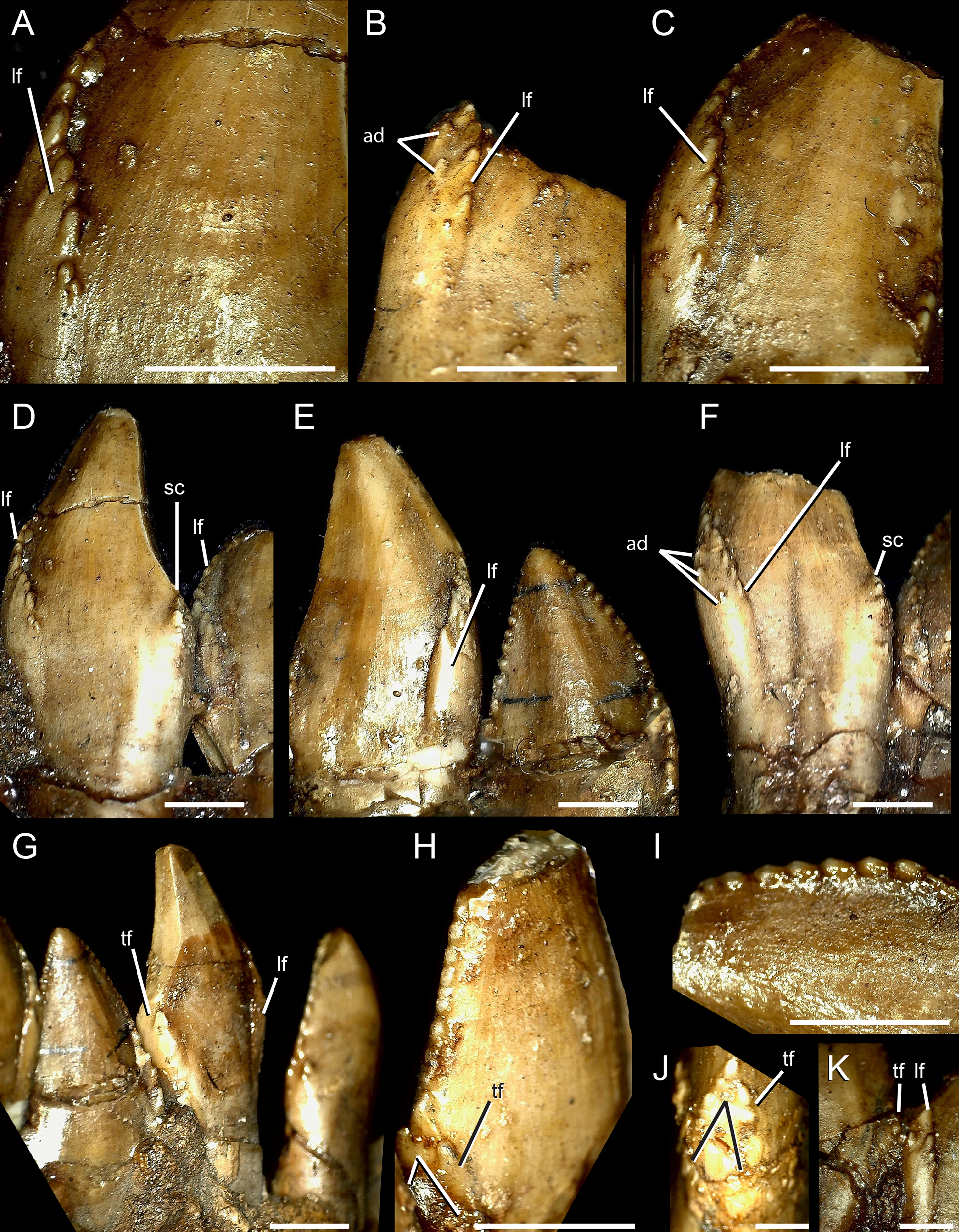
Segnosaurus mesial teeth

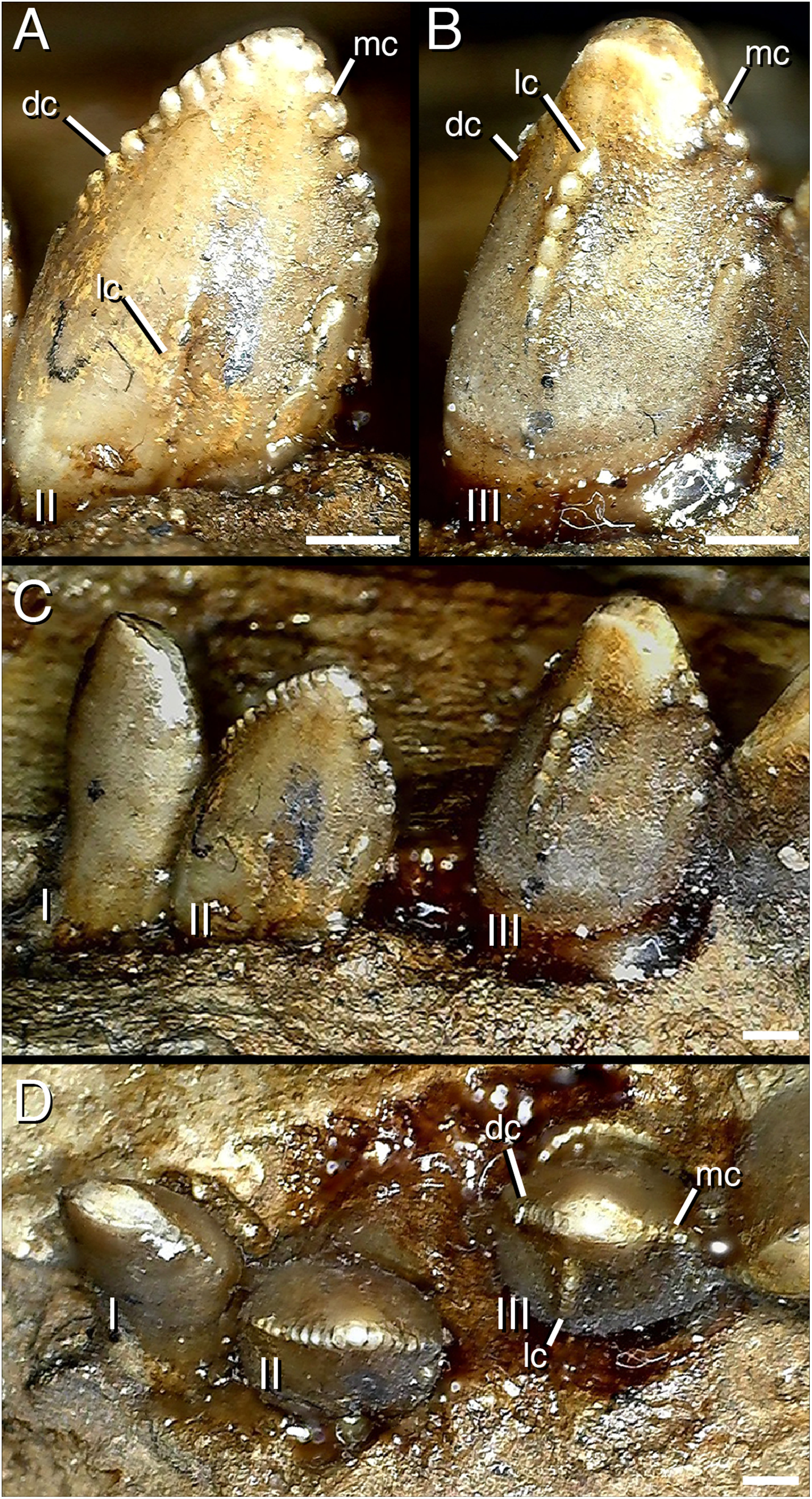
Segnosaurus dentary teeth

The dentition is another featured trait in therizinosaurids which differs from all theropod groups. At least two different tooth morphologies are observed among therizinosaurids; the first is represented by relatively homodont, oval to lanceolate-shaped teeth with moderate coarse denticles (serrations) on the crowns (upper exposed part). This type of dentition is better represented by the complete, three-dimensional holotype skull of Erlikosaurus which features the mentioned characters. Two isolated teeth are known from Nothronychus and they are lanceolate-shaped, symmetrical, have moderate denticles, and strongly resemble those of Erlikosaurus. Furthermore, they seem to derive from the dentary based on comparisons with the latter. The preserved holotype dentary tip of Neimongosaurus preserves an erupted tooth that is lanceolate-shaped with small coarse serrations, falling within this type of dentition. Another type of dental morphology is the one seen on the highly specialized Segnosaurus. In this taxon, the teeth are very heterodont, leaf-shaped with relatively less denticles that are prominently developed being bigger than in the previous therizinosaurids. These denticles are composed of numerous folded carinae (cutting edges) with denticulated front edges, creating a roughened and shredding surface near the base of the tooth crowns. Most therizinosaurids appear to have had a low tooth replacement rate or not able to lose them at all.

=== Postcranial skeleton ===
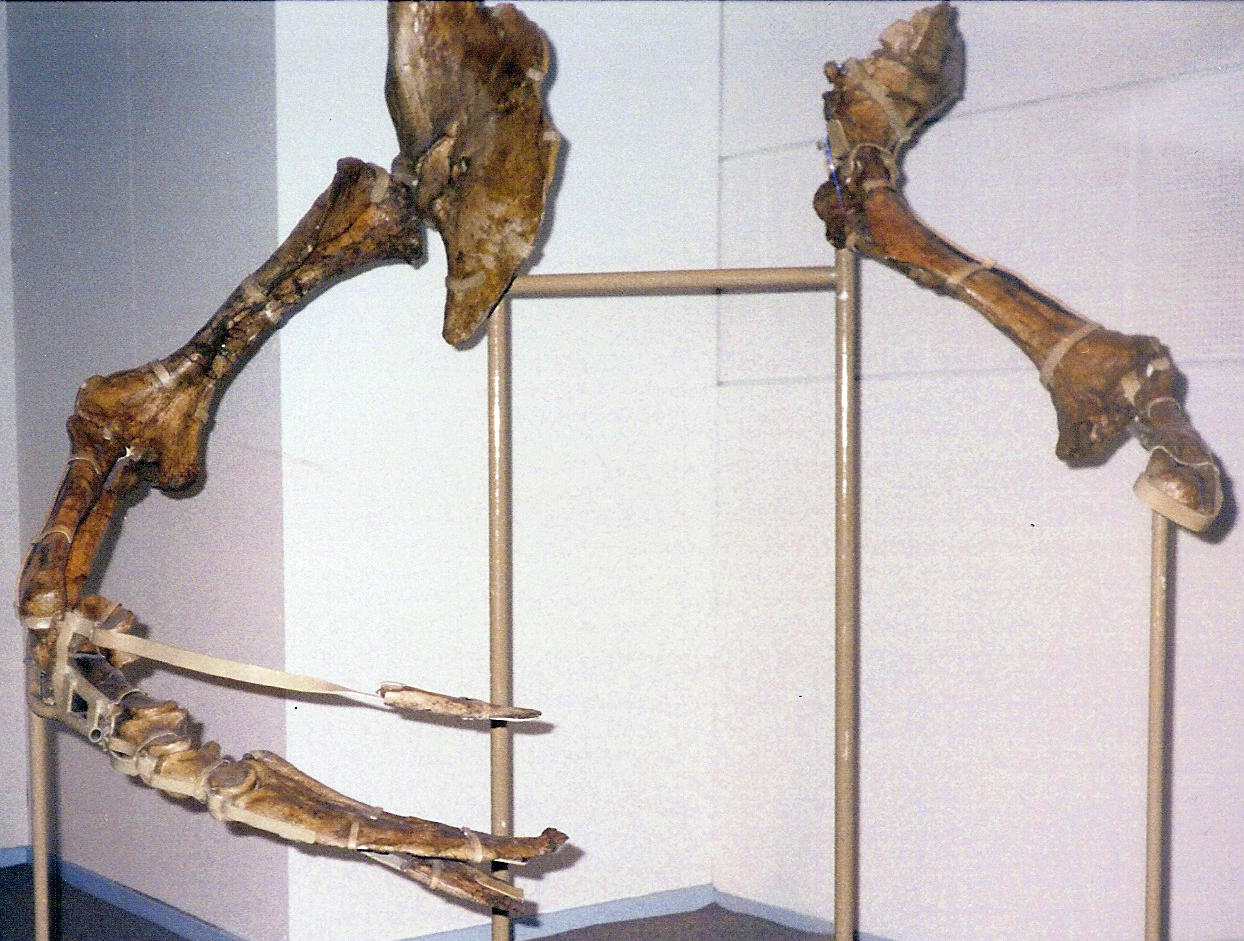
Frontal view of the arms in Therizinosaurus IGM 100/15

In therizinosaurids, the shoulder girdle was robustly specialized than in other maniraptorans and less bird-like. The scapula (shoulder blade) was very straight and flattened at the upper end being fused to the coracoid bone, forming the scapulocoracoid. Near the region of the scapulocoracoid suture, on the coracoid, a large foramen is present. The coracoid is a wide and broad element that is slightly convex and thickened near of the scapulocoracoid suture. The humerus (upper arm) was exceptionally robust and flexible with wide lower ends as seen on the humeri of the therizinosaurids Nothronychus and Therizinosaurus. Not only that but the biceps muscle was prominently well-developed in Therizinosaurus. In Segnosaurus, the deltopectoral crest (deltoid muscle attachment) was strongly built. The antebrachium was relatively straight in most members, particularly on Therizinosaurus. The reduced carpal block on therizinosaurids enabled an enhanced hand flexion. Manual phalanges are relatively standard in shape among maniraptorans with a formula of digits I, II and III.

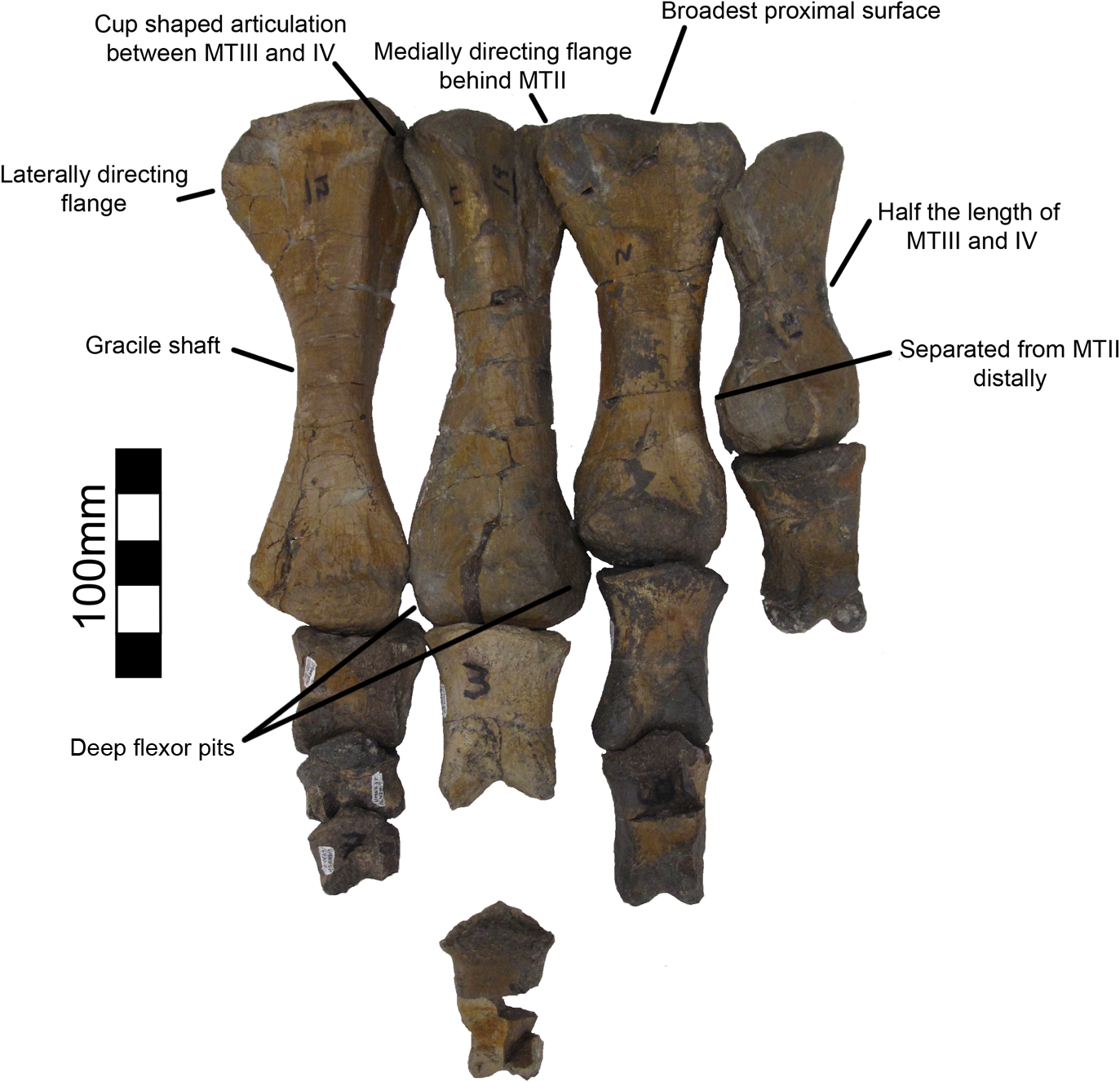
Right foot of Nothronychus graffami

The manual unguals (claw bones) are proportionally larger than the phalanges, strongly flattened from side to side, and recurved with more degrees of specialization than therizinosauroids. Most therizinosaurids had sharply pointed and recurved unguals with very robust tubercles (flexor tendons attachment). These traits are better seen on Nothronychus and Segnosaurus. In Therizinosaurus, however, the manual unguals were extremely elongated and straight with poor curves. Although most of them are incomplete, if restored, they would measure about 1 m (3.3 ft) long, which make them the largest hand claws of any known terrestrial animal. The tubercles are not as strongly developed as in other therizinosaurids though, in addition, Therizinosaurus had some of the longest forelimbs known for any bipedal dinosaurs: the preserved right arm in specimen IGM 100/15 has a total length of 2.4 m (7.9 ft).

The vertebral column was highly pneumatized (air-spaced) and is relatively well documented from several badly to well-preserved elements among genera but specimens of Nanshiungosaurus and Nothronychus preserve the most complete series of vertebrae. Therizinosaurids had large and robust cervical vertebrae with relatively short neural spines and platycoelous (concave at both ends) to opisthocoelus (concave posterior ends) centra that were elongated and had some degree of pneumacity. In dorsal vertebrae the neural spines are more elongated and stiff. Several pneumatopores (small openings leading to air pockets) are present on the dorsolateral surfaces of the centra and they progressively reduce in size. Some species like N. graffami had a narrow hump-like structure on their back as indicated by the very elongated neural spines of the first dorsals. In therizinosaurids, the sacrum was composed by about six sacral vertebrae with broad centra that have rounded facets. The caudal vertebrae were stocky with stiff and rounded transverse projections. When compared to early members, therizinosaurids had a reduction in the number of caudals and a minor chevron constriction, which indicates a shorter and flexible tail.

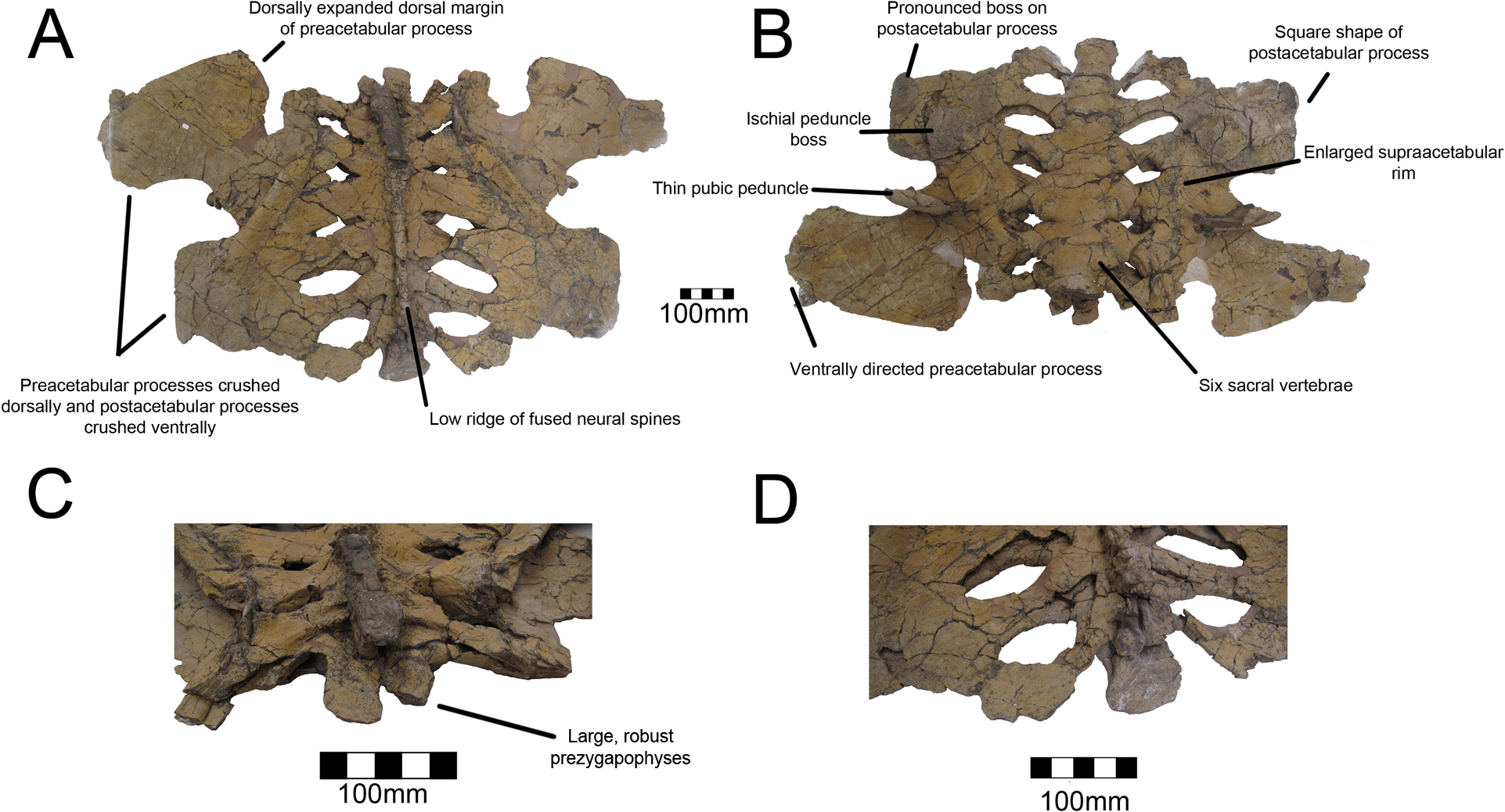
Pelvis of Nothronychus graffami

Therizinosaurids had wide torsos supported by a broad, sloth-like pelvis. The ribcage was very round and composed by elongated ribs with fairly robust capitula. The most modified element within the therizinosaurid build was the possession of a unique opisthopubic pelvis (pubis and ischium extending backwards), a feature known otherwise only in birds and ornithischians. The ilium was larger than the ischium and pubis, having very deflected and pronounced iliac blades. The prominent extension of the ilium shows that therizinosaurids had massive thighs. On the bottom of the ischium, a large obturator process (ridge-like expansion) was present, most notably in Segnosaurus and Nothronychus. The pubis was larger than the ischium and had a large pubic boot (wide expansion at the end). Unlike any other theropod group, the pubis and ischium were attached together forming a solid structure with a square end. Both femur and tibia were robust in constitution. The former was relatively straight with well-developed articulations and femoral head. The tibia was slightly shorter than the femur and had a wide lower end, forming a prominent ankle. The fibula was pinched to the bottom and very stiffened. Both astragalus and calcaneum were generally robust and elongated bones but the astragalar body was apparently reduced in this group. The astragalus has an elongated lateral condyle but the medial one is narrower. The lateral projection of the astragalus is thickened and extends to the midline of the whole element from the inner side to the rear, leading space for the lower end of the tibia; this exposes the lateral surface of the tibia in a frontal view. The calcaneum was larger and robust than most theropods. It has a rounded shape with concave articular surfaces and had a mobile articulation with the adjacent elements such as the astragalus or distal tarsals. Another highly modified element was the tetradactyl pes: the metatarsus was composed by four shortened, fully functionally metatarsals. Metatarsals III and IV were almost equal in size, the second was slightly narrow and the first one was the shortest. There are, however, traces of metatarsal V but it is highly reduced and has no functional significance−as seen on Segnosaurus. The phalangeal formula was as in other maniraptorans, IV-4, III-3, II-2 and I-1 (excluding the unguals). The pedal unguals were sharply pointed, side to side flattened and smaller than the manual unguals. In Erlikosaurus however, they are massive, combining a stiff and recurved shape with robust tubercles.

== Classification ==
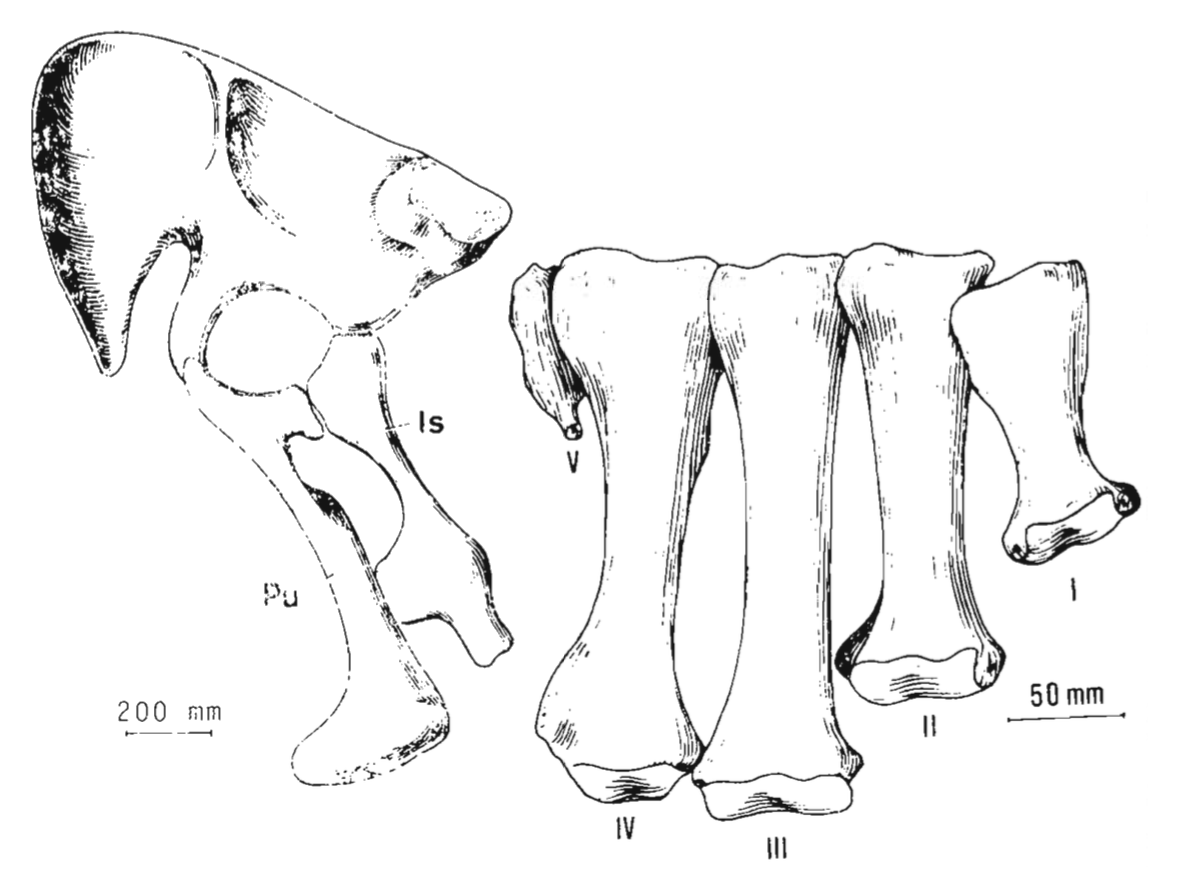
Segnosaurus holotype pelvis in lateral view and metatarsus in top view as in the original description by Perle

The family Therizinosauridae was coined by Evgeny Maleev in 1954 to contain the enigmatic Therizinosaurus, who interpreted this taxon as representing giant marine turtles. Relatives of Therizinosaurus were later found but not recognized as such for some time. With the description of Segnosaurus in 1979, the paleontologist Altangerel Perle coined the family Segnosauridae to contain this enigmatic taxon and tentatively considered this group to represent theropods. He noted that this new family was different from Therizinosauridae based on claw and antebrachium traits. Moreover, in the same year Perle and Rinchen Barsbold analyzed the pelvis structure of Segnosaurus and concluded that it was unusually different from those of "traditional" theropods. Based on these observations, they proposed that segnosaurids should be separated into a separate grouping, near the level of the main division infraorder Saurischia. Parallel to this, the newly and also described Nanshiungosaurus was assigned to the Titanosaurinae by Dong Zhiming based on the assumption it was a sauropod genus. In the following year, both Barsbold and Perle named the new theropod infraorder Segnosauria, containing the Segnosauridae. In this new paper they also described the new Erlikosaurus and Enigmosaurus (then unnamed) noting that segnosaurs were more similar to theropod dinosaurs and though some of their features resembled those of ornithischians and sauropods, these similarities were superficial and distinct when examined in detail.

In 1982, Perle described a third specimen of the therizinosaurids Therizinosaurus. He referred this material to the genus based on the striking similarities with the specimens of Segnosaurus. Additionally, Perle compared the forelimbs in these two taxa and concluded that they were characterized by elongated arms, possibly belonging to a single taxonomic group. However, based on osteological features, in 1984 Gregory S. Paul proposed that segnosaurs were no theropods but Late Cretaceous prosauropods and they represented a transitional form between prosauropods and ornithischians. For instance, segnosaurs resembled prosauropods in their skull and foot morphology and were also similar to ornithischians in their snout, pubis, and ankle. In 1988 he suggested a segnosaurian classification for the therizinosaurids Therizinosaurus. In a review article on the book The Dinosauria in 1990, Barsbold and Teresa Maryańska considered Segnosauria to be an enigmatic group of saurischians with a position subject to change. They, however, disagreed with Therizinosaurus as a segnosaurian taxon since it was known from forelimb material; they corroborated the referred hindlimb material as segnosaurian though. Lastly, Barsbold and Maryańska noted the striking similarities between the pelvises of Nanshiungosaurus and Segnosaurus, such as the opisthopubic condition and large iliac blade. They concluded that the former was part of the Segnosauridae.

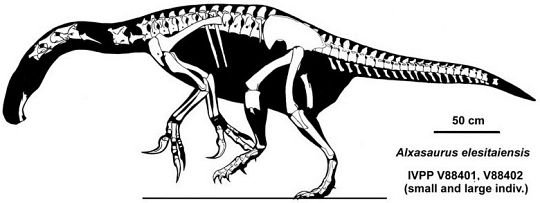
Skeletal composite of two specimens of Alxasaurus

With the description of the therizinosauroids Alxasaurus in 1993 by Dale A. Russell and Dong Zhiming, the affinities of the group were fairly more clear. This new taxon represented the most complete member and was known from multiple specimens with numerous theropod traits. Moreover, the preserved hindlimbs in some specimens showed that the assignment of segnosaurian hindlimbs to Therizinosaurus was correct and "segnosaurs" were in fact theropods. Russell and Dong also noted the extreme similarities between Therizinosauridae and Segnosauridae and considered that the latter was a synonym of the former due to priority. However, Alxasaurus was a fairly more primitive genus and the superfamily Therizinosauroidea was coined to contain it and related species. Posterior to this year, Clark and colleagues redescribed the holotype skull of Erlikosaurus and found more theropod traits than when first described. They concluded that therizinosaurs were more likely to be classified as maniraptoran theropods. Therizinosauria itself, was erected in 1997 by Rusell in order to contain all of these theropods. This new infraorder was composed of Therizinosauroidea and the more advanced Therizinosauridae. The family Therizinosauridae was first given a phylogenetic definition by Paul Sereno in 1998, who defined it as all dinosaurs closer to Erlikosaurus than to Ornithomimus.

In 2010, Lindsay Zanno conducted the most detailed phylogenetic analysis of the Therizinosauria to that point. She cited the inaccessibility, damage, potential loss of holotype specimens, scarcity of cranial remains, and fragmentary specimens with few overlapping elements as the most significant obstacles to resolving the evolutionary relationships within the group. The position of Segnosaurus and those of some other Asian therizinosaurids was affected by these factors; Zanno stated more well-preserved specimens and the rediscovery of missing elements would be necessary. Zanno also revised Therizinosauroidea to exclude Falcarius and retained it in the wider clade Therizinosauria, which became the senior synonym of Segnosauria. In addition, she defined Therizinosauridae as the least inclusive clade containing Erlikosaurus, Nothronychus, Segnosaurus and Therizinosaurus. Falcarius and Jianchangosaurus are now regarded as the most primitive therizinosaurs while therizinosauroids are considered to be more derived that these two taxa, but less derived than therizinosaurids.

Most phylogenetic analyses recover the family Therizinosauridae containing Erlikosaurus, Erliansaurus, Nanshiungosaurus, Neimongosaurus, Nothronychus, Segnosaurus and Therizinosaurus. However, Suzhousaurus is commonly recovered within the group. Therizinosauridae, along a handful of named genera, constitute the superfamily of Therizinosauroidea and finally, Therizinosauroidea falls within the higher infraorder of Therizinosauria. Although a consensus has yet to be reached, it has been proposed that therizinosaurs are the most primitive clade within Maniraptora, as well as the sister clade to oviraptorosaurs.

The cladogram below follows the 2019 phylogenetic analysis by Scott Hartman and colleagues, which is largely based on the work from Zanno in 2010. While most therizinosaurids are recovered in relatively traditional, well-established positions, the therizinosauroid "Nanshiungosaurus" bohlini was unusually recovered as a therizinosaurid taxon (not shown in the cladogram):

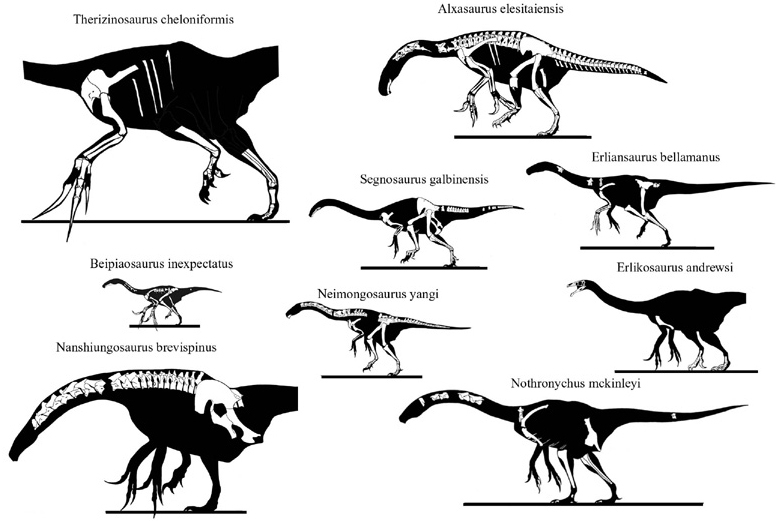
Skeletal composite of various therizinosaurs (not to scale)

- Therizinosauridae
  - - Suzhousaurus Asia
    - - Neimongosaurus Asia
      - - Therizinosaurus Asia
        - Erliansaurus Asia
  - - Nanchao embryos Asia
    - - Nanshiungosaurus Asia
      - - - Segnosaurus Asia
          - AMNH 6368 Asia
        - - - Erlikosaurus Asia
            - Nothronychus mckinleyi North America
            - Nothronychus graffami North America

== Paleobiology ==
=== Feeding ===
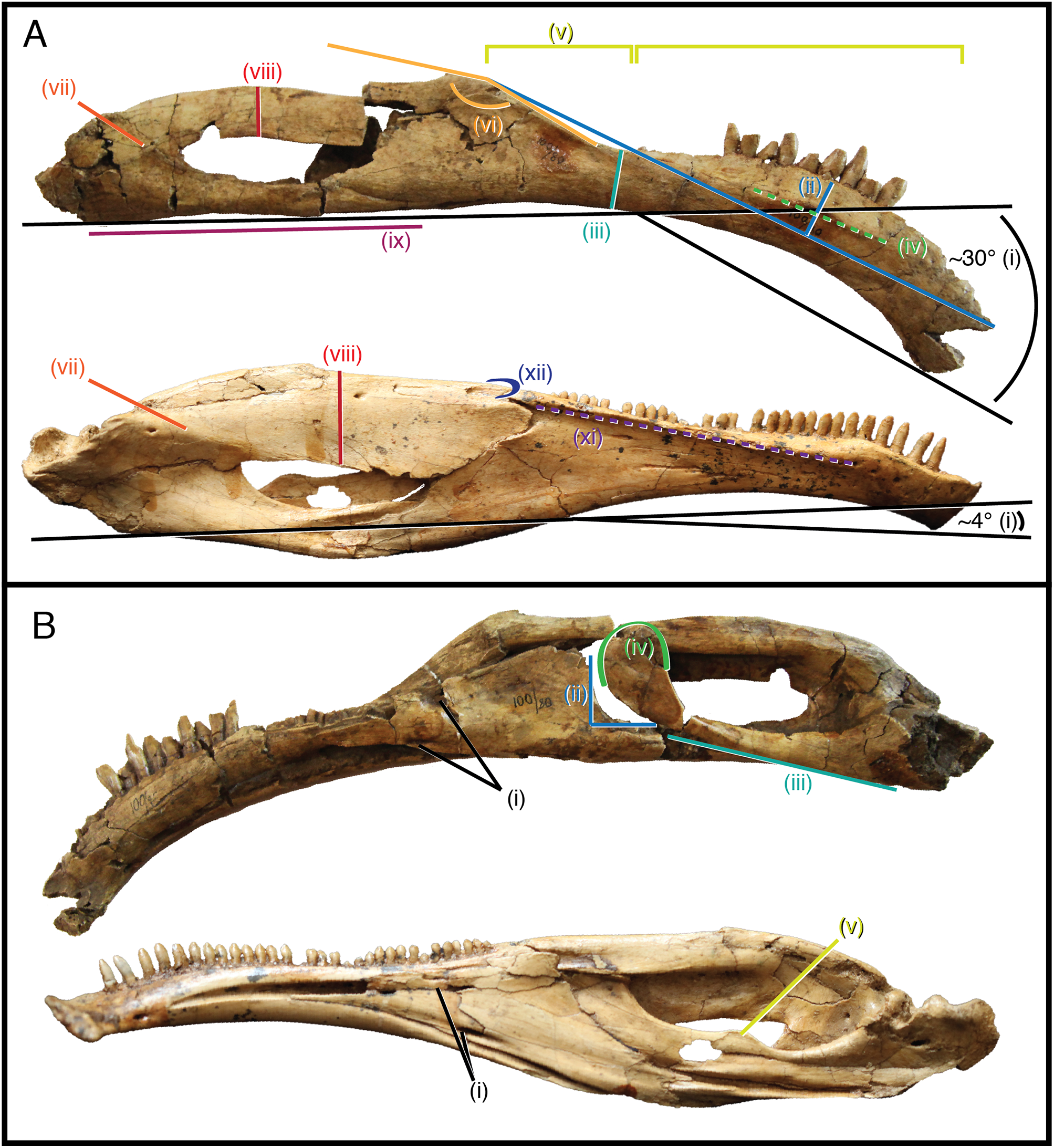
Lower jaws of Erlikosaurus (bottom) and Segnosaurus (top) compared

In 2009, Zanno and colleagues stated therizinosaurs were the most-widely regarded candidates for herbivory among theropods based on the small, densely packed, coarse serrations; lance-shaped teeth with a relatively low replacement rate; a well-developed keratinous beak; long neck for browsing; relatively small skulls; a very large gut capacity as indicated by the rib circumference at the trunk and the outwards flaring processes of the ilia; and the notable lack of cursorial adaptations in the hind limbs. All of these features suggest that members of this family feed on vegetation, as well as pre-processing it within their mouths to begin the breakdown of cellulose and lignin. This is perhaps even more so true for therizinosaurids, which seem to have further exploited these characters. One of the most notable adaptations in advanced therizinosaurids are the four-toed feet, which had a fully functional, weight-bearing first digit that was likely adapted to slow life-style. Zanno and colleagues found that Ornithomimosauria, Therizinosauria, and Oviraptorosauria had either direct or morphological evidence for herbivory, which would mean either this diet evolved independently multiple times in coelurosaurian theropods or that the primitive condition of the group was at least facultative herbivory with carnivory only emerging in more derived maniraptorans. The skull of therizinosaurids was specialized as well, as it was likely capped off with a beak-like rostrum in the front. It has been argued that this rostrum was likely covered with a keratinous beak, an adaption that might have helped to enhance cranial stability by mitigating the stress and strain experienced by the skull during feeding.

As indicated by their respective dental morphologies, the contemporaneous therizinosaurids Erlikosaurus and Segnosaurus were separated by niche partitioning. These differentiations include the relatively indistinct and symmetrical teeth with moderate serrations (denticles) in Erlikosaurus, and the enlarged serrations in Segnosaurus composed of additional carinae and folded carinae with denticulated front edges, which together created a roughened, shredding surface near the base of the tooth crowns that was apparently unique to Segnosaurus and suggest they consumed unique food resources or used highly specialized feeding strategies, and had a higher degree of oral food processing than other therizinosaurids. In addition to these morphological differences, in 2019 Button and Zanno note that herbivorous dinosaurs followed two main distinct modes of feeding. One of these was processing food in the gut which is characterized by gracile skulls and relatively low bite forces. The second was oral food processing, characterized by features associated with extensive processing such as the lower jaws or dentition. Segnosaurus was found to be in the former mode, whereas Erlikosaurus was more likely to fall in the second group, indicating these two therizinosaurids were functionally separated and occupied different niches. During the same year, Ali Nabavizadeh concluded that most therizinosaurs were mainly orthal feeders (moving their jaws up and down and not to the sides) and raised their jaws isognathously whereby the upper and lower teeth of each side contacted each other at once.

However, advanced Late Cretaceous therizinosaurids had relatively weak bite forces compared to primitive therizinosaurs. In 2013 the paleontologist Stephan Lautenschlager performed digital reconstructions for the cranial musculature in Erlikosaurus and found the bite force of Edmontosaurus being greater than that for the former. The lesser bite force for Erlikosaurus better served in stripping and cropping leaves, rather than active mastication. On a newer study with more therizinosaur taxa, Lautenschlager found similar conclusions. The evolutionary trends in jaw mechanics of therizinosaurs noticed a change in bite force through time, from higher bite forces in early members to lesser ones in the advanced therizinosaurids. Therizinosaurids were aided by the down-turned tip and symphyseal regions (union between bones) of the dentaries, and probably also by beaks. By contrast, the straighter and more elongated dentaries of primitive therizinosaurs had the highest magnitudes of stress and strain. A downwards-pulling motion of the head while gripping vegetation was more likely than a sideways or upwards movement, though such behavior would be more likely in therizinosaurids with their stress-mitigating jaws.

=== Foraging ===
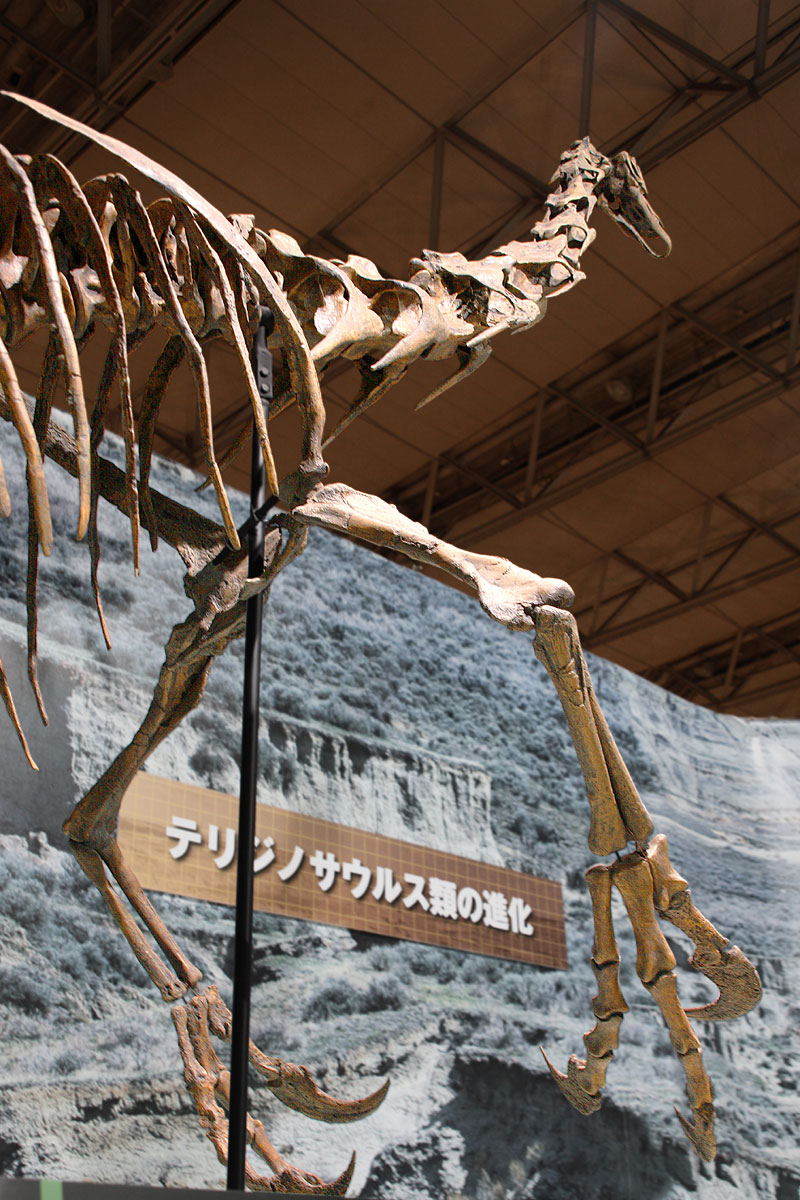
Skeletal mount of Nothronychus featuring prominent arms and claws

Among therizinosaurids, the forelimbs were increased in robustness and the flexibility of the wrist was increased as well, with this, the presumed reach for foraging is likely to have lengthened. Moreover, the pectoral girdle has been modified to further augment upright reach, however the grasping ability of the animals is thought to have decreased. These adaptations are more linked to assist with their herbivorous lifestyle, as they have specialized the ability to harvest and collect vegetation. Moreover. in the therizinosaurids Neimongosaurus, the range of motion in the arms was roughly circular at the glenoid-humeral joint at the shoulder, and directed sideways and slightly downwards, which diverged from the more oval, backwards-and-downwards-directed ranges of other theropods. This ability to extend their arms considerably forwards may have helped these therizinosaurids reach and grasp for foliage. In 2014, Lautenschlager tested the biomechanical function of multiple therizinosaur claws. He noted that the hands of some therizinosaurids (such as Nothronyhus or Therizinosaurus) were more effective when piercing or pulling down vegetation. The arms would have had to be able to extend the range of the animal to a point that could not be reached by the head if they were used for browsing and pulling down vegetation. In genera where both neck and forelimb elements are preserved, however, the necks were equal in length or longer than the forelimbs, so pulling vegetation would only be likely if lower parts of long branches were pulled down to access out-of-reach vegetation. Lautenschlager also found that therizinosaurid claws would not have been used for digging, which would have been done with the foot claws because, since as in other maniraptorans, feathers on the forelimbs would have interfered with this function. Additionally, this action leads to a higher stress tension on the dorsal area of the claw−this is more evident in Therizinosaurus. However, he could neither confirm nor disregard that the hand claws could have been fully used for sexual display, self-defense, intraspecific competition, mate-gripping during mating or grasping stabilization when foraging.

=== Brain and senses ===
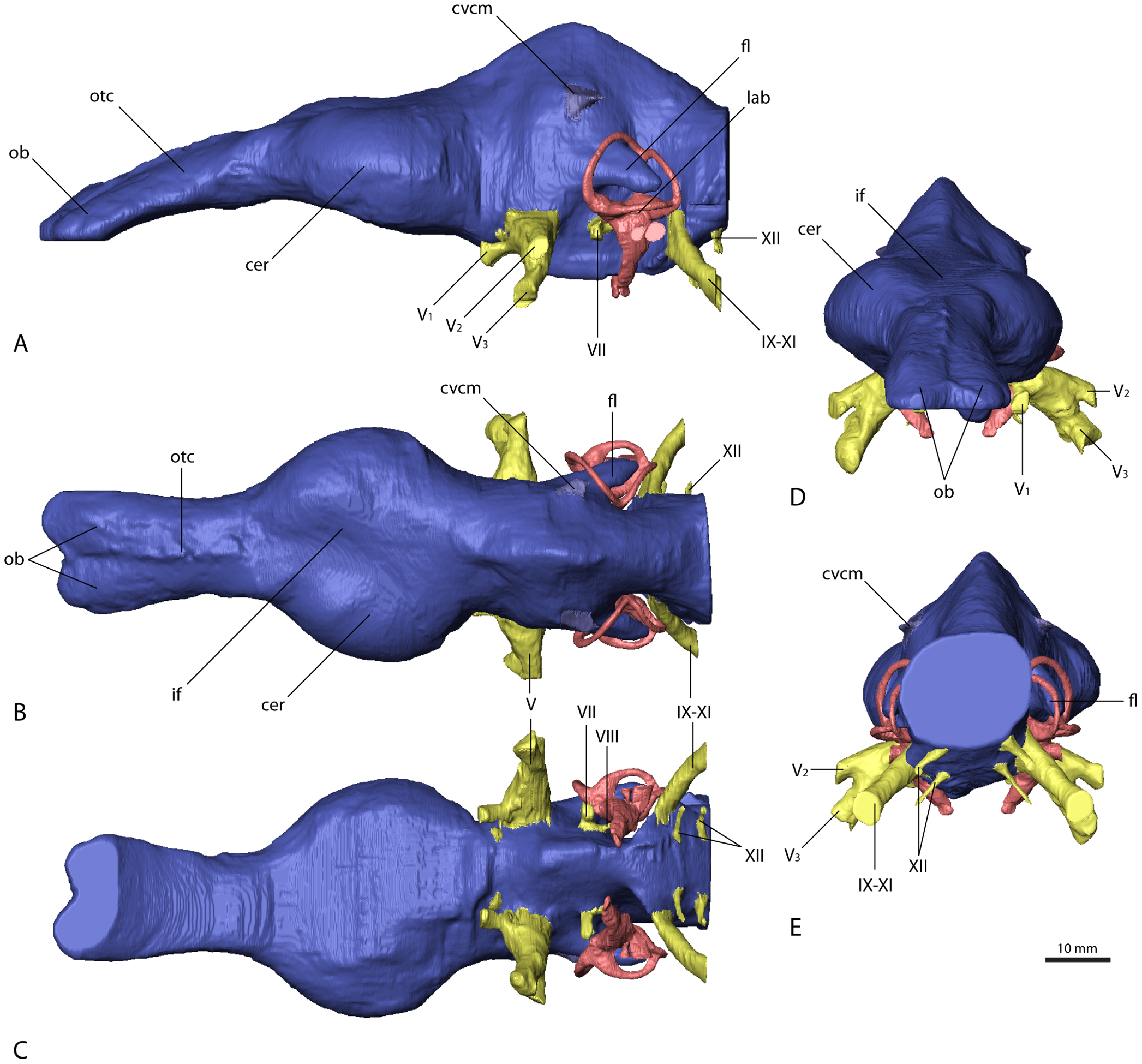
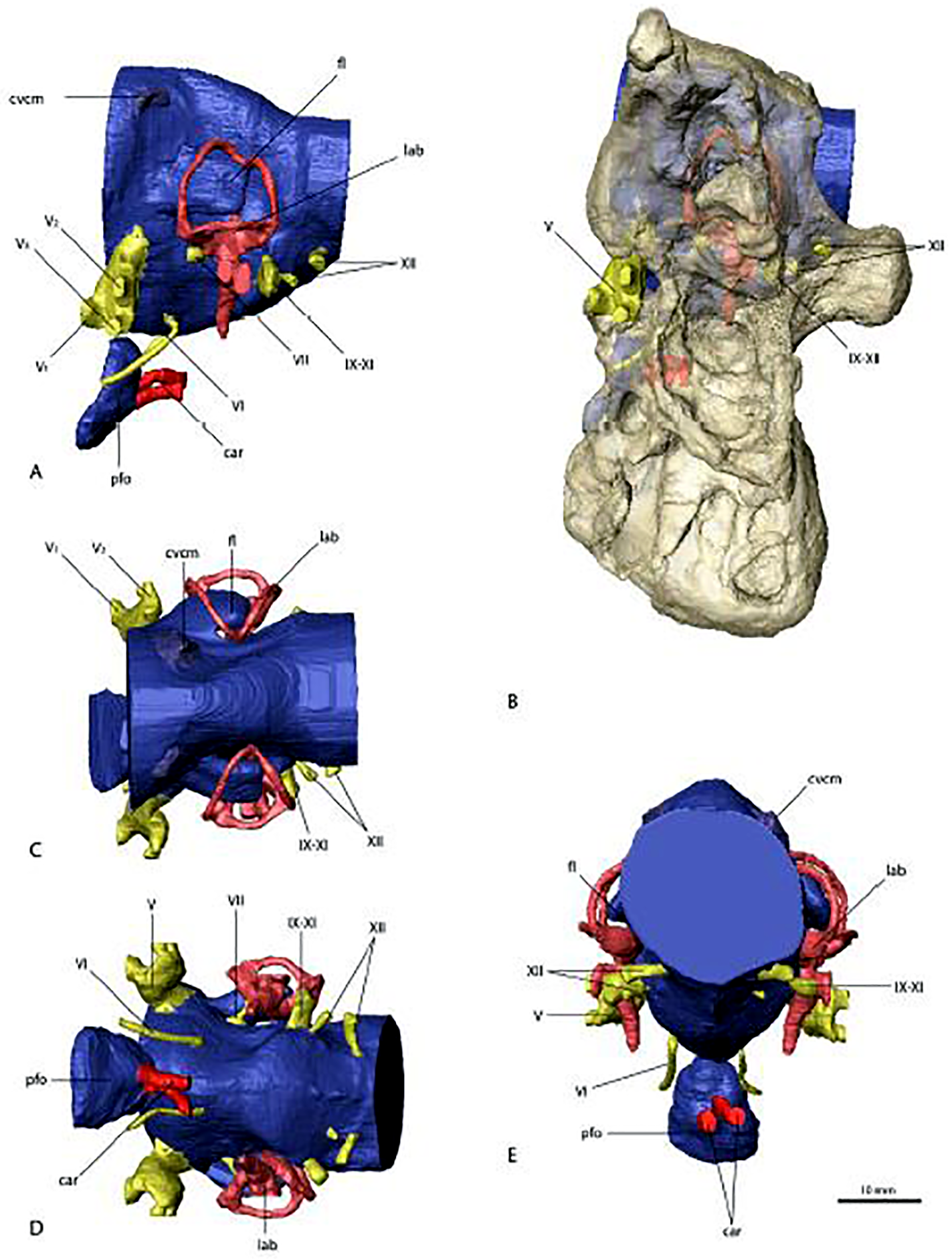
Cranial endocasts of Erlikosaurus (left) and N. mckinleyi (right)

The group is also notable for adaptations to the structures of their ear. The structure of their inner-ear is almost avian, with bird-like semicircular canals and an extended cochlea. For birds, an extended cochlea allows them to hear across an increased range of frequencies, suggesting a similar function in the ponderous therizinosaurids and also allowing them a good hearing and balance, which indeed, are traits better associated with carnivorous theropods. Furthermore, the lengthening of the cochlea, an adaptation which has independently evolved in a number of other theropod groups, is thought to further improve auditory acumen. The forebrain of therizinosaurids was fairly enlarged and developed with elongated olfactory bulbs. The adaptations to the inner-ear and forebrain of therizinosaurids likely served a number of functions, such as well-developed senses of smell, complex social behavior, increased alertness to the vocalizations of juveniles or even communicating with conspecifics, moreover, the large pneumatic chambers on the sensorial areas in the skulls of therizinosaurids (Erlikosaurus or Nothronychus mckinleyi) indicates that the tympanic systems would result in increased and optimal low frequency sound reception, possibly infrasound. Such is the case of N. mckinleyi, which had an average hearing frequency of 1100 to 1450 Hz and possible upper limits between 3000 and 3700 Hz. Features include not only extensive basicranial pneumaticity, but also the development of a basisphenoid bulla (hollow bony structure). In addition, the orientation of the horizontal semicircular canal relative to the horizontal orientation of the occipital condyle gave therizinosaurids a horizontal head posture that enabled binocular vision with overlapping visual fields. A vast majority of these senses were also well-developed in earlier coelurosaurs and other theropods, indicating that therizinosaurids inherited many of these traits from their small, carnivorous maniraptoran ancestors and retained the ancestral, carnivorous ear configuration to be used for their different and very specialized dietary purposes.

=== Locomotion ===
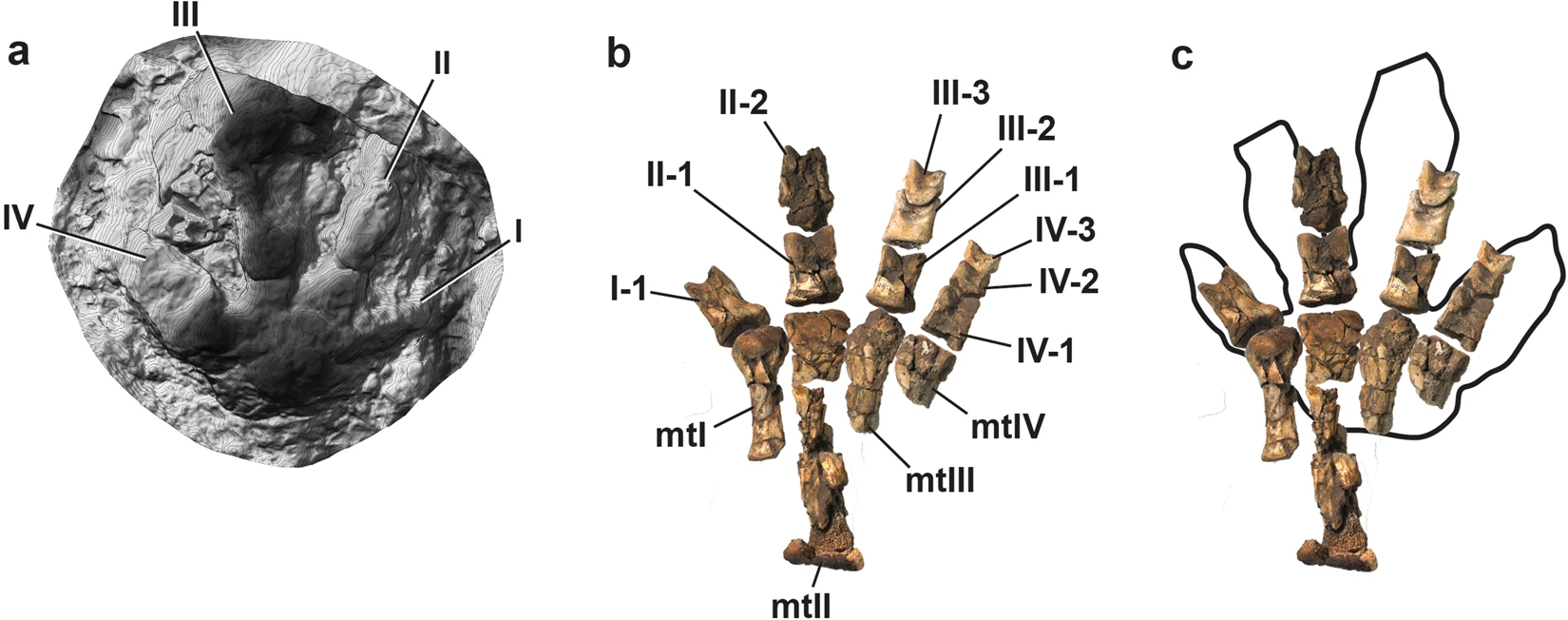
Footprint of DMNH 2010-07-01 compared to the foot of Erlikosaurus

In 1964, Zakharov described and named the particular ichnogenus Macropodosaurus, which is represented by a series of four-toed footprints. These tracks were found in beds of the Cenomanian age at Tajikistan, noting that they were made by a bipedal four-toed dinosaur and the toes were webbed or at least, very fleshy. It is unlikely that these were made by a quadrupedal animal since no manual footprints were found in association. The footprints are about 50 cm (500 mm) long and 30 cm (300 mm) wide. Since the research of therizinosaurs started posterior to these findings, Zakharov was not able to determine the exact type of dinosaur. Sennikov in 2006 re-examined these footprints and concluded that a therizinosaurid-grade dinosaur could have made those tracks. He compared Macropodosaurus with the articulated feet of Erlikosaurus and the referred one from Therizinosaurus revealing that when articulated in a plantigrade position they fit in the morphology of Macropodosaurus. Therefore, he considered these tracks to be more associated with therizinosaurids and was one of the first in propose a plantigrade stance in therizinosaurids. An additional Macropodosaurus-grade footprint was discovered in Poland and first reported in 2008. This footprint is reminiscent of the tracks described by Zakharov and therefore assigned to Macropodosaurus sp. These tracks could indicate the presence of therizinosaurs in Europe. In 2017 Masrour with colleagues reported Macropodosaurus footprints in what is now Morocco. They are similar to the original description with some degree of semiplantigradism.

However, several other footprints may indicate a more digitigrade stance. Such is the case the footprints from the Cantwell Formation labelled under the numbers DMNH 2010-07-01, 2013-08-04, 2013-08-06 and 2014-11-05. These impressions are composed by four toes with the first digit slightly smaller than the others which is attributed to therizinosaurids. At least one footprint, DMNH 2010-07-01, was directly compared to the relatively complete right pes of Erlikosaurus revealing a consistent morphology. However, most of the footprint was made (apparently) by the fingers and a foot pad, indicating a more upright position of the metatarsals. Nevertheless, Botelho and colleagues have also considered a plantigrade stance for therizinosaurids in 2016. Accordingly, members of the Therizinosauridae (such as Neimongosaurus or Nothronychus) re-evolved a fully functional first digit that articulates to the ankle.

=== Reproduction ===
==== Nesting ====
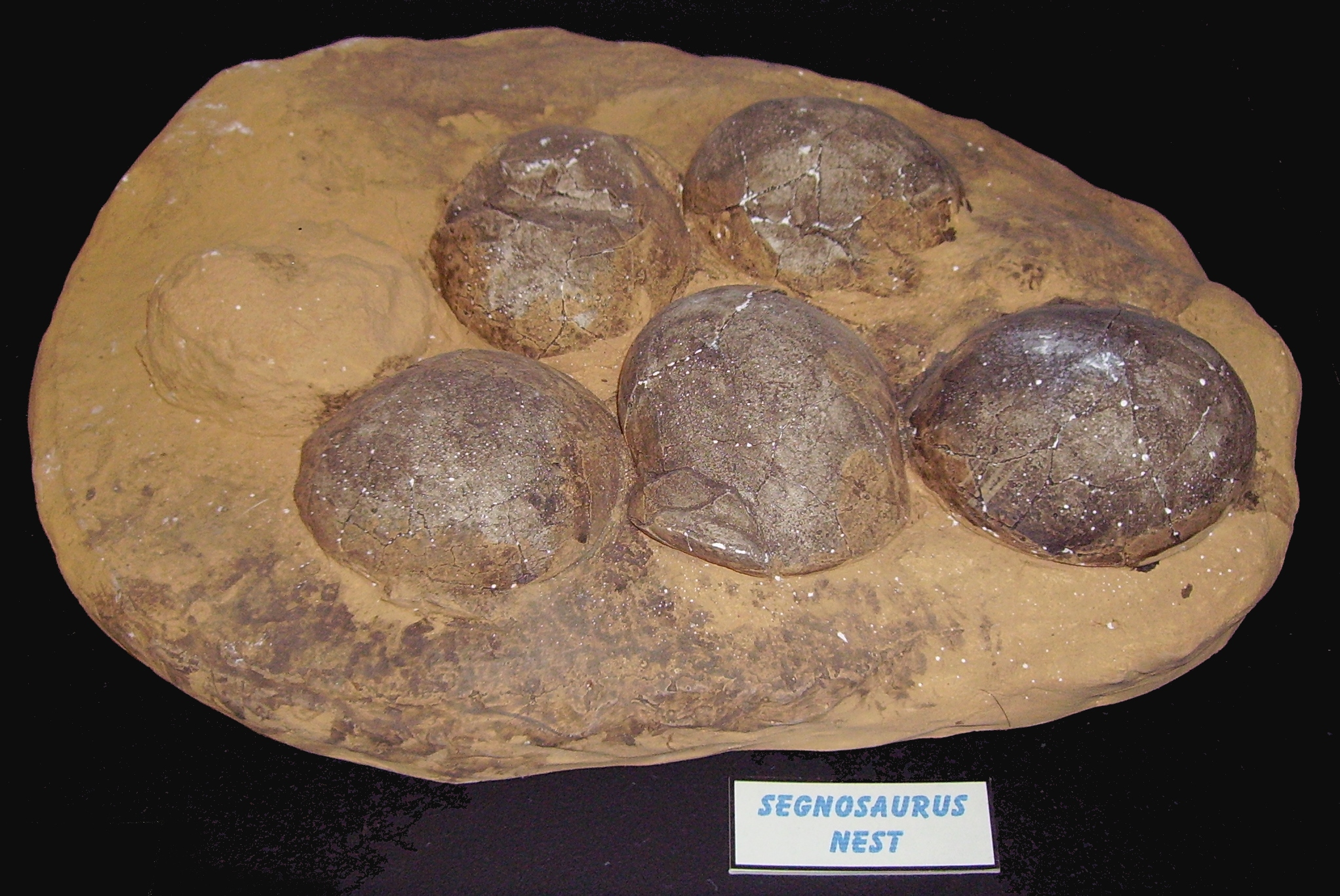
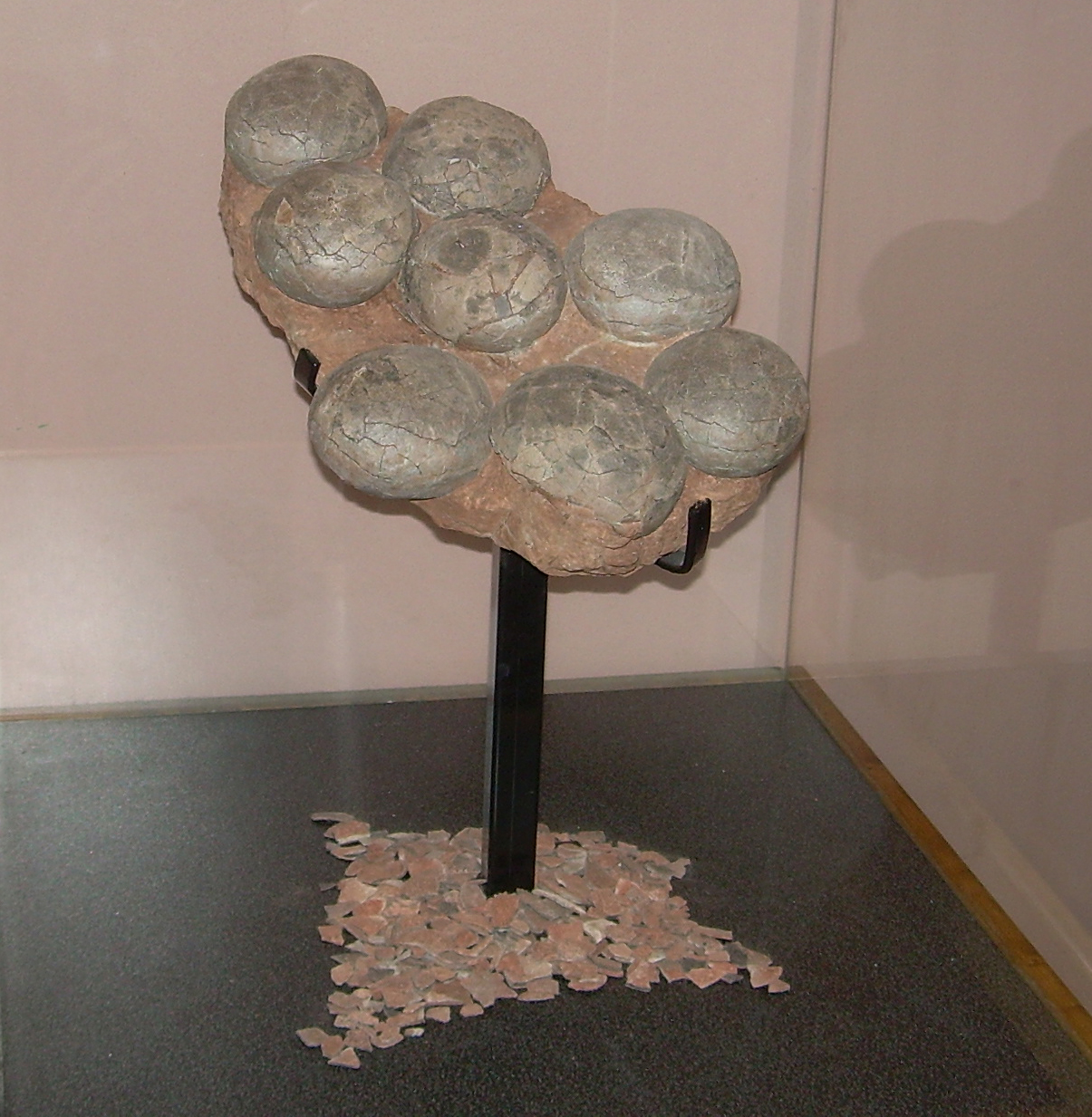
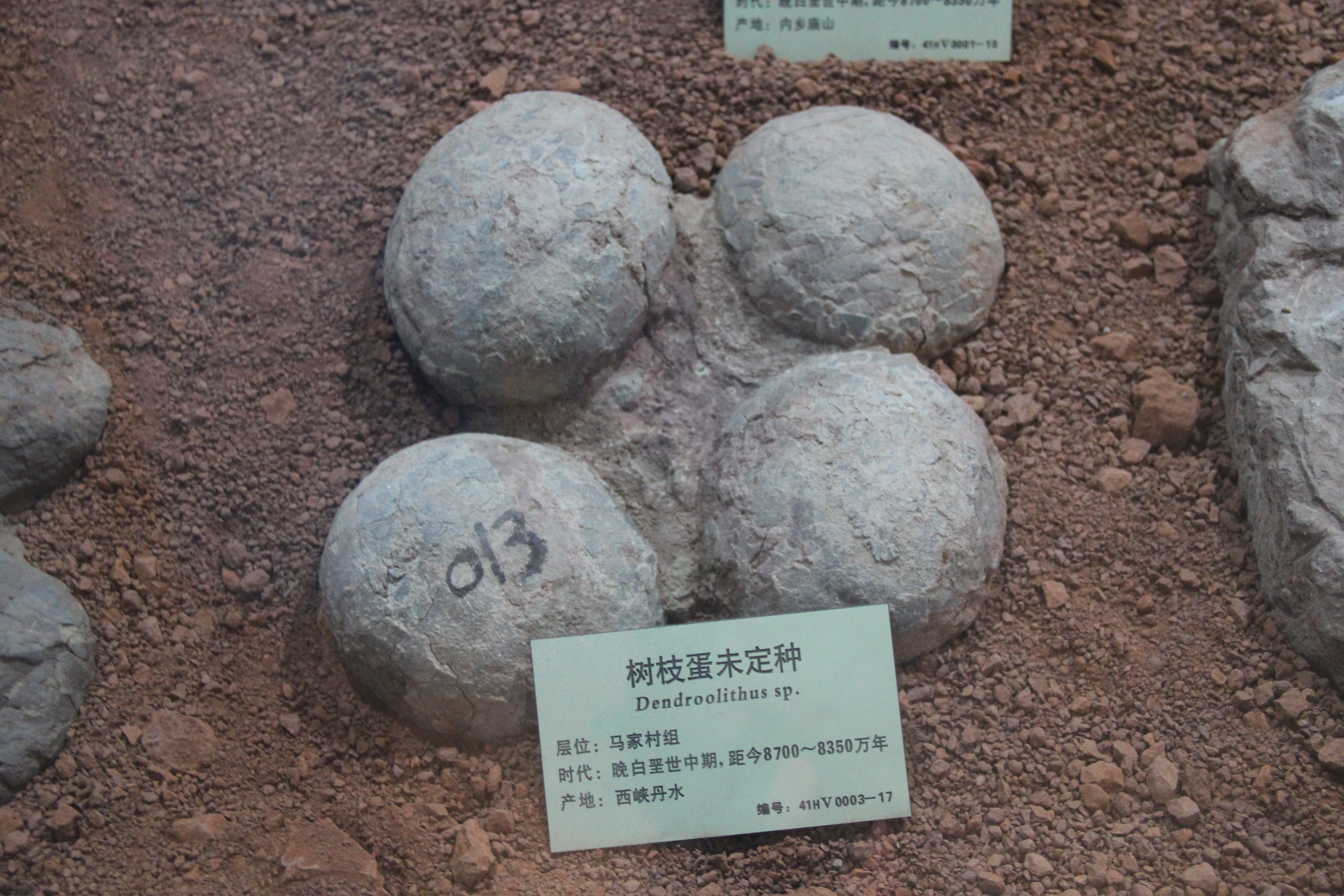
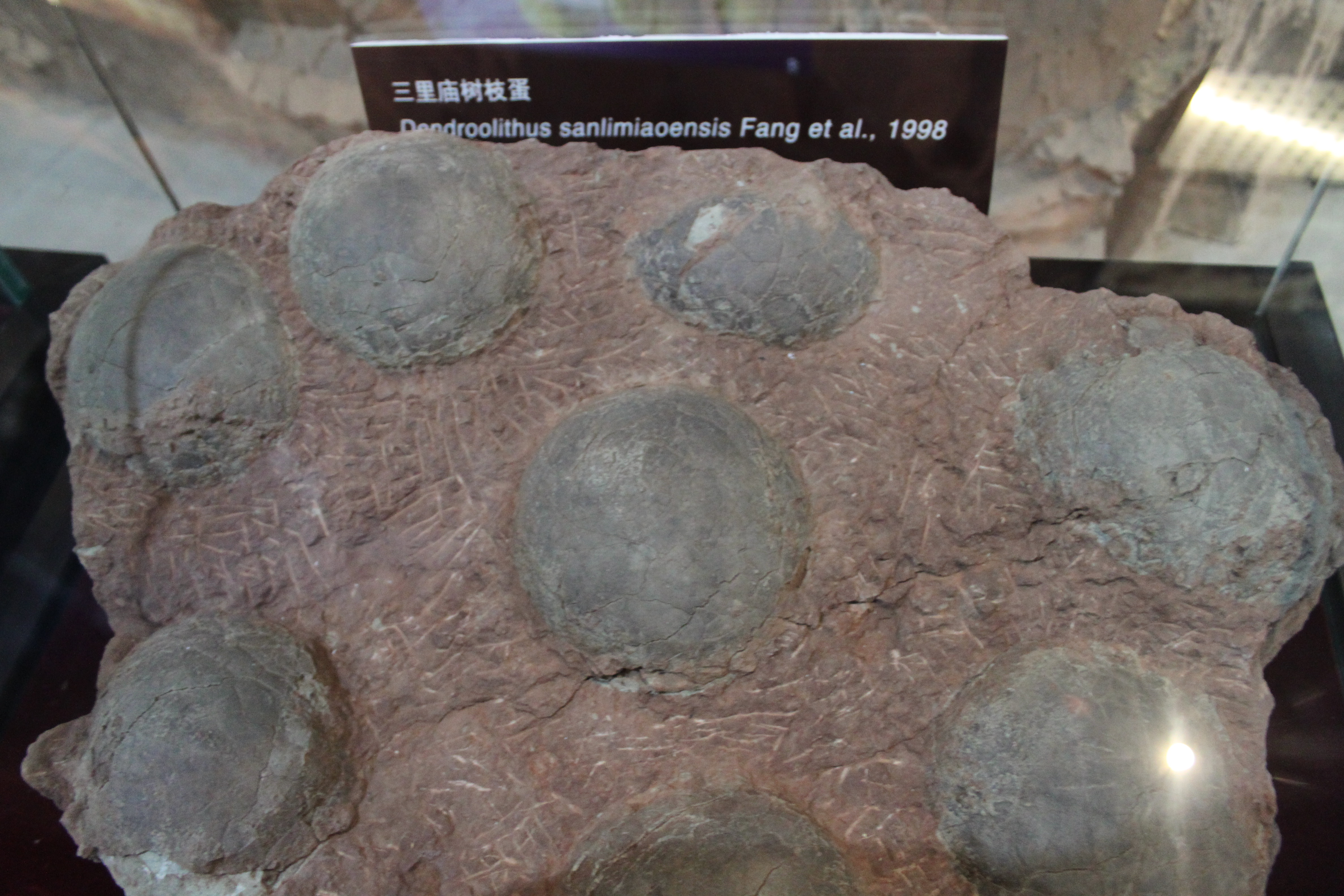
Several dendroolithid nests with egg clutches from Asia

Some of the first dendroolithid eggs—which are attributed to therizinosaurs—were reported from the Bayan Shireh and Nanchao formations on the same year, 1997. These consisted of several egg clutches (a group) with an average composition of 7 or more eggs. In addition, the Bayan Shireh Formation has produced fully grown, specific therizinosaurid taxa, such as Erlikosaurus and Segnosaurus. The egg nests from the Nanchao Formation remained undescribed for several years, only being briefly examined but identified to contain fossilized embryos. However, in 2007 these were described by paleontologist Martin Kundrát and colleagues and tentatively identified as therizinosaurids based on anatomical features such as the tooth-less premaxilla with a downturned edge, dentary with a lateral shelf, teeth with leaf-shaped crowns, humerus with a prominent deltopectoral crest, ilium with an expanded anterior end, and the elongated, sharply-pointed manual unguals. Most eggs have an average size of 7 cm × 9 cm (70 mm × 90 mm) and given these dimensions, they likely were laid by a medium-sized female. Although several egg clutches were found, one was found containing 7 eggs of which 3 of them were preserving the embryos. In 2019, Hartman and colleagues were the first authors to include these embryos in a phylogenetic analysis and as expected, the embryos were recovered as therizinosaurids.

In a 2013 conference abstract, paleontologist Yoshitsugu Kobayashi and colleagues reported an exceptional nesting ground site of theropod dinosaurs at the Javkhlant Formation, which contained at least 17 egg clutches from the same layer within an area of 22 m by 52 m. Each clutch contained spherical eggs which were in contact with each other and arranged in a circular structure without a central opening. Based on microscopical features in the eggshells, they identified the eggs as dendroolithids, which had previously been attributed to therizinosaur-grade dinosaurs. The multiple clutches indicate that some therizinosaurids were colonial nesters and the fact that they were found in a single stratigraphic layer suggests that they nested at the site on a single occasion and therefore did not exhibit philopatric behaviour. This nesting site was formally described in 2019 by Kohei Tanaka and colleagues. In this comprehensive description, the amount of egg clutches was corrected to at least 15, noting that the eggs were laid in clutches composed of 3 to 30 eggs and hatched in the same single nesting season. The eggs have an average diameter of 13 cm (130 mm) with some variations between 10 cm (100 mm) and 15 cm (150 mm). Based on the smooth outer surface, both inner and outer portions, and several irregular-shaped pore canals of these eggs, they were corroborated to pertain to the Dendroolithidae. Approximately the 50% of the nesting area has been eroded, and based on the egg clutches distribution, the nest density can be estimated around 1 nest per 10 m^{2}. This indicates that up to 32 nests were originally present. The habitat that the parents nested in was a semi-arid flood plain and the egg clutches were covered in organic-rich material during incubation as some extant archosaurs do today (crocodiles and megapode birds). In addition, the egg-shell fragments association indicates that many of the clutches hatched before the site was buried by a flood event. Out of a total of 15 clutches, at least 9 successfully hatched, which represents a nesting success rate of at least 60% for the entire site.

The prominent nesting site of the Javkhlant Formation indicates that colonial nesting first evolved in non-avian dinosaur species to increase hatching success in ecosystems subject to high nest predation pressure (such as this formation). Lastly, though dendroolithid eggs are also attributed to megalosauroids, and therizinosaurids are not known from the Javkhlant Formation, it overlies the Bayan Shireh Formation, where other dendroolithid eggs and the therizinosaurs Enigmosaurus, Erlikosaurus and Segnosaurus were found. Moreover, the absence of megalosauroids on these formations is notable.

==== Ontogeny ====
Embryonic therizinosaurid based on stage D fossilized embryos

At least four developmental embryonic stages were reported from the Nanchao embryos; Kundrát and colleagues classified them from stages A to D depending on the development. Stage A is the earliest of all and is characterized by the poor ossification of bones and the porous structure of the centra in the vertebral column. During stages B and C the bones become slightly more articulated and ossified. These seem to correspond with developmental levels of 45–50, and 64-day-old embryos of the american alligator. The last and more advanced stage is D where the embryos had completely ossified vertebral centra and a partially reduced neurocentral suture in their cervical vertebrae. Additionally, most therizinosaurian characters are more notorious in this phase, such as the edentulous premaxilla. The most mature embryo is represented by CAGS-01-IG-5, which had a clearly more developed ossification than alligator hatchlings. This indicates that embryonic therizinosaurids reached a more mature skeleton than other archosaur hatchlings in ovo and stayed within the egg for a longer period to enlarge their proportions despite the advanced ossification. Based on the developmental states preserved within embryos, Kundrát and colleagues suggested a rough incubation period between 1.5 and 3 months.

Given that some embryos had their bones ossified and the fact that no adults were found in association with the nests, therizinosaurid hatchlings were highly precocial (capable of locomotion from birth) and able to leave their nests to feed alone, independently of their parents. Subterraneously constructed nests could be an indicative of the lack of parental care during the incubation period, furthermore, the skeletal maturity of stage D embryos was considerably adapted to allow immediate locomotion after birth, potentially suggesting a superprecocial behaviour. The independence from their parents may also be supported by the development of the teeth of the hatchlings that is consistent to an omnivorous diet.

== Paleoecology ==
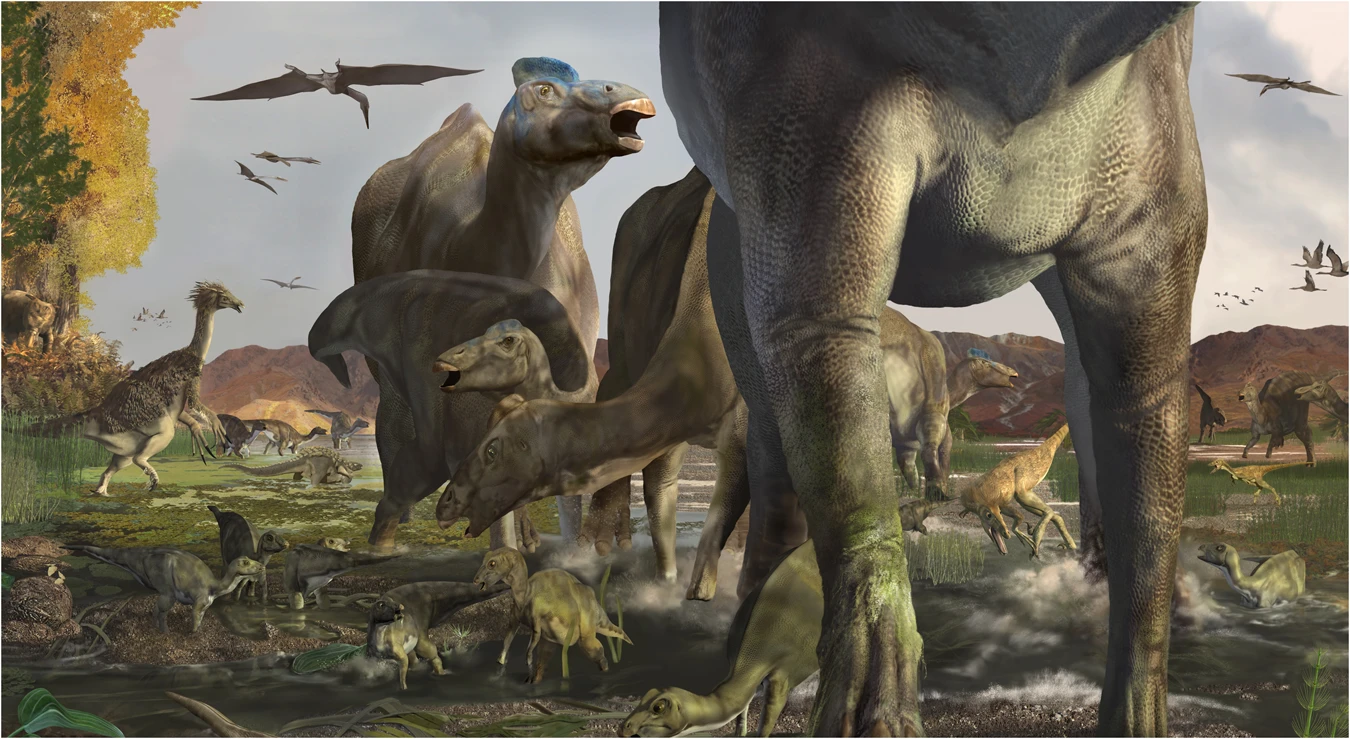
Hadrosaurid-therizinosaurid occurrence in the Cantwell Formation

Therizinosaurids were very specialized herbivores that evolved a convergent life-style to the more recent ground sloths. They are so similar in some aspects that this idea is also reflected in the name of several species, such as Nothronychus (slothful claw) or Suzhousaurus megatherioides (Megatherium-like). Multiple of their anatomical and physiological traits such as leaf-shaped, coarsely serrated teeth, strong arm build with large claws, a notoriously elongated neck and the development of a keratinous beak situate therizinosaurids as browser herbivores. More specifically, therizinosaurids inhabited high-browsing niches in their ecosystems and commonly lived in semi-arid to wetland-like habitats composed of high vegetation as seen on the fluvial-lacrustrine setting of most specimens.

As reflected by at least 31 therizinosaurid footprints at the Cantwell Formation of Alaska, some species formed small herds, which is consistent with the complex brain and ear structure in these theropods. The co-occurrence with hadrosaurids on this area may also indicate that these very different dinosaurs benefited from an ecological interaction, just as some animals today congregate for mutual beneficial reasons, such as augmented resource acquisition or lesser predation pressure. It is also possible that a herd of hadrosaurids and therizinosaurids walked across this terrain at different times and did not encounter each another. Regardless of these explanations, the therizinosaurid trackway reflects a gregarious behaviour in these theropods.

=== Distribution ===
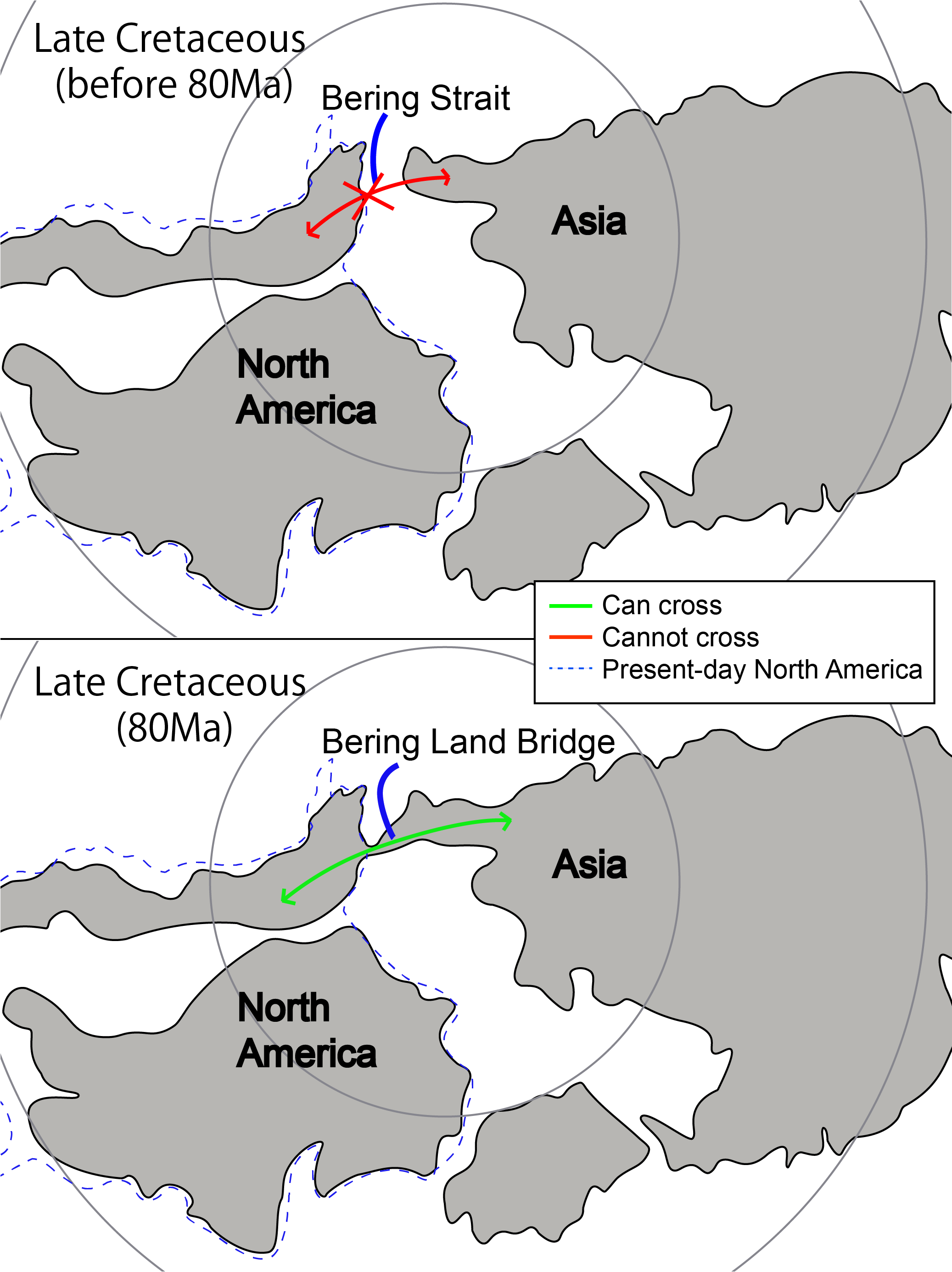
Faunal exchange between Asia and North America

Although the vast majority of all therizinosaurids have come out of Asia (especially from China and Mongolia), the relatively complete remains of Nothronychus have been found outside Asia in North America. Though the fossil record of therizinosaurids indicates that the family flourished near the Turonian stage of the Late Cretaceous, by the Barremian stage there was already a pan-Laurasian distribution of therizinosauroids. Since Laurasia was beginning to break apart during the Cretaceous, two theories have arisen to explain how therizinosaurs could have spanned across Laurasia. One theory is that primitive members were already present in both Asia and North America before it began to drift apart, suggesting an emergence for therizinosaurs of at least the Late Triassic. A second theory is that the group dispersed between Asia and North America via a "Cretaceous" Beringian land bridge during the Berriasian-Valanginian stages. This last proposal is supported by the presence of therizinosaurids in North America during the early Late Cretaceous such as Nothronychus. Nevertheless, therizinosaurid-grade footprints are known from remote locations such as Europe or Africa. Several four-toed tracks were found in Poland, and a series of footprints dating back to the Late Cretaceous were found in Morocco. Both findings may indicate that therizinosaurids were far more disperse than previously thought.

The idea of a land bridge is even more supported by the multiple co-occurrence of hadrosaurid and therizinosaurid footprints at the lower Cantwell Formation of the Denali National Park, which reflects an important faunal exchange between landmasses. These tracks show the dominant presence of hadrosaurids and a reduced concentration of therizinosaurids in the same location at potentially the same time. As indicated by the discovery of a waterlily-like impression representing a single fossil leaf from the same site, the trackway was made by the dinosaurs as they crossed a shallow body of water away from the main river channels, which is curious given that during the Late Cretaceous this part of North America was a semi-arid habitat. This occurrence at this single locality within the lower Cantwell Formation has not been documented elsewhere in North America and these trackways represent the first reported encounter between notoriously different dinosaurs from North America. The diversity of the ichnotaxa in this site supports the idea of similar dinosaur faunas between Alaska and Asia during the Late Cretaceous period, specifically with the Nemegt Formation which had relatively wet environments. Fiorillo and colleagues suggested that Alaska represented a "gateway" for faunal exchange between the two continental landmasses and the existence of a "Cretaceous" Beringian land bridge further allowed this mixing of faunas, which was encouraged as similar habitats were present within Asia and North America.

== See also ==
- Timeline of therizinosaur research
