= Evgeny Maleev =

Soviet paleontologist (1915–1966)

Evgeny Aleksandrovich Maleev
- Born: February 25, 1915; Uryupinsk, Don Host Oblast, Russian Empire
- Died: April 12, 1966 (aged 51); RSFSR, Soviet Union
- Education: Candidate of Sciences
- Alma mater: Moscow State University
- Known for: Dinosaurs
- Scientific career
- Fields: Paleontology
- Institutions: MSU Faculty of Biology

Evgeny Aleksandrovich Maleev (Russian: Евгений Александрович Малеев, pronounced [jɪˈvɡenʲɪj ɐlʲɪˈksandrəvʲɪtɕ mɐˈlʲeɪf]; 25 February 1915 – 12 April 1966) was a Soviet paleontologist who primarily worked on Asian reptiles, both extinct and extant. His most notable discoveries include the ankylosaur Talarurus, the tyrannosaur Tarbosaurus and the Therizinosauridae family.

== Biography ==
Evgeny Aleksandrovich Maleev was born on February 25, 1915, in the Russian Empire. After being a member on the Eastern Front (World War II) he started his scientific career at the Moscow State University. In 1947 he graduated from the Faculty of Biology and he started to work at the Paleontological Institute, Russian Academy of Sciences. In 1950 Maleev presented his PhD thesis, "Morphofunctional analysis of the occipital region of the skull and skeleton of the neck of mammals", being awarded the Candidate of Sciences. Later on, he worked as the deputy manager from 1956 to 1962. He also was the leader of an expedition conducted in 1962 to Indonesia with the purpose of analyze Komodo dragon specimens. Maleev did notable research at the institute until his death in 1966.

== Scientific research ==
Maleev is recognised for his research on Asiatic prehistoric life, such as the naming and description of the famous dinosaurs Talarurus, Tarbosaurus and Therizinosaurus. In recognition of his contribution to science, two dinosaurs were named in honor of Maleev: Maleevus and Maleevosaurus.

Although his PhD thesis was mainly focused on mammals, his interests were oriented towards reptiles. In 1948 he was a member of the Joint Soviet-Mongolian Paleontological Expedition conducted in the Gobi Desert of Mongolia. The expedition culminated in the discovery of Talarurus, which was later described by him in 1952. When first described, based on the claws, Maleev interpreted the remains of Therizinosaurus as belonging to a gigantic turtle-like reptile, he also named the family Therizinosauridae. After a long debate, the enigmatic fossils were later confirmed to belong to a giant theropod dinosaur.

At some point, Maleev analyzed Tarbosaurus brains by cutting open the fossilized braincases with a diamond saw. In contrast to the risky methods used by Maleev, modern researchers use computer tomography scans and 3D reconstruction software (CT scans) to visualize the interior of dinosaur endocrania, thus eliminating the need to damage valuable specimens.

== Selected publications ==
- Maleev, E. A. (1952). "Новый анкилозавр из верхнего мела Монголии" [New ankylosaur from the Upper Cretaceous of Mongolia]. Doklady Akademii Nauk SSSR (in Russian). 87 (2): 273–276.
- Maleev, E. A. (1954–1956). "Панцирные динозавры верхнего мела Монголии" [Armored dinosaurs from the Upper Cretaceous of Monglia]. Trudy Paleontologicheskogo Instituta Akademiy Nauk SSSR (in Russian). 62: 51–91.
- Maleev, E. A. (1954). "Noviy cherepachoobrazhniy yashcher v Mongolii" [New turtle−like reptile in Mongolia]. Priroda (in Russian) (3): 106–108.
- Maleev, E. A. (1955). "Новый хищный динозавр из верхнего мела Монголии" [New carnivorous dinosaurs from the Upper Cretaceous of Mongolia]. Doklady Akademii Nauk SSSR (in Russian). 104 (5): 779–783.
- Maleev, E. A. (1964). "Основы палеонтологии. Земноводные, пресмыкающиеся и птицы" [The basics of paleontology. Amphibians, reptiles and birds] (in Russian).
- Maleev, E. A. (1965). "O golovnom mozge khishchnych dinosavrov" [The carnosaur dinosaur brain]. Paleontologicheskii Zhurnal. 1965 (2): 141–143language=Russian.
- Maleev, E. A. (1974). "Gigantskie carnosavri semeystva Tyrannosauridae" [Gigantic carnosaurs of the family Tyrannosauridae]. Trudy Sovmestnaya Sovetsko-Mongol'skaya Paleontologicheskaya Ekspeditsiya (in Russian). 1: 132–193.

== See also ==
- Halszka Osmólska
- Kenneth Carpenter
- Teresa Maryańska
