= Maleevus =

Maleevus Temporal range: Late Cretaceous 90 Ma

Scientific classification
- Domain: Eukaryota
- Kingdom: Animalia
- Phylum: Chordata
- Clade: Dinosauria
- Clade: †Ornithischia
- Clade: †Thyreophora
- Clade: †Ankylosauria
- Family: †Ankylosauridae
- Genus: †Maleevus; Tumanova, 1987
- Species: †M. disparoserratus

Binomial name
- †Maleevus disparoserratus Tumanova, 1987

Synonyms
- Syrmosaurus disparoserratus Maleev 1952

Extinct genus of dinosaurs

Maleevus (named in honour of Evgeny Maleev) is an extinct genus of herbivorous ankylosaurid dinosaur from the late Cretaceous, around 90 million years ago (possibly 98-83 Ma), of Mongolia.

== Discovery and naming ==
Between 1946 and 1949, Soviet-Mongolian expeditions uncovered fossils at Shiregin Gashun. In 1952, Soviet palaeontologist Evgenii Aleksandrovich Maleev named some ankylosaurian bone fragments as a new species of Syrmosaurus: Syrmosaurus disparoserratus. The specific name refers to the unequal serrations on the teeth.

The holotype, PIN 554/I, was found in a layer of the Bayan Shireh Formation dating from the Cenomanian-Santonian. It consists of two upper jawbones, left and right maxillae. Maleev erroneously assumed these represented the lower jaws. Referred was specimen PIN 554/2-1, the rear of the skull of another individual.

In 1977, Teresa Maryańska noted a similarity with another Mongolian ankylosaur, Talarurus, in that both taxa have separate openings for the ninth to twelfth cerebral nerve; she therefore renamed the species as Talarurus disparoserratus. Having determined that Syrmosaurus is a junior synonym of Pinacosaurus, Soviet palaeontologist Tatyana Tumanova named the material as a new genus Maleevus in honor of Maleev in 1987. The type species remains Syrmosaurus disparoserratus, the combinatio nova is Maleevus disparoserratus. In 1991, George Olshevsky named the species as a Pinacosaurus disparoserratus. In 2014, Victoria Megan Arbour determined that the rear skull was not different from that of many other ankylosaurids and that the single distinguishing trait of the teeth, a zigzag pattern on the cingulum, was shared with Pinacosaurus. She concluded that Maleevus was a nomen dubium.

== Size ==
The preserved maxillae have a length of about 12 centimetres (4.7 in). This indicates that Maleevus was a medium-sized ankylosaur at around 6 metres (20 ft) in length based on the related Talarurus. The height and weight of Maleevus are unknown due to the lack of known remains.

== Classification ==
Syrmosaurus disparoserratus was by Maleev placed in the Syrmosauridae. Today Maleevus is seen as a member of the Ankylosauridae.

== See also ==
- Timeline of ankylosaur research
