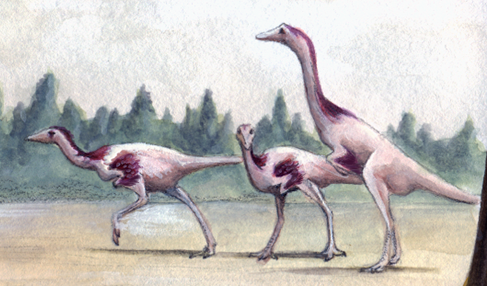
- Hypothetical life reconstruction of three Kinnareemimus

Scientific classification
- Kingdom: Animalia
- Phylum: Chordata
- Class: Reptilia
- Clade: Dinosauria
- Clade: Saurischia
- Clade: Theropoda
- Clade: Maniraptoriformes
- Clade: †Ornithomimosauria
- Genus: †Kinnareemimus; Buffetaut et al., 2009

Type species
- †Kinnareemimus khonkaenensis Buffetaut et al., 2009

Synonyms
- "Ginnareemimus" (nomen nudum) Kaneko, 2000

= Kinnareemimus =

Kinnareemimus Temporal range: Early Cretaceous ~125 to 120 Ma - Late Barremian

Extinct genus of dinosaurs

Kinnareemimus (/ˌkɪnəriˈmɑːiməs/, meaning "Kinnaree mimic", after a figure from Thai folklore) is an extinct genus of ornithomimosaurian theropod dinosaur that was discovered in the Early Cretaceous Sao Khua Formation in what is now Thailand. The genus contains only the type species, K. khonkaenensis. The specific epithet is after Khon Kaen Province, which is in northeastern Thailand, where the remains of the animal were discovered.

== Discovery and naming ==
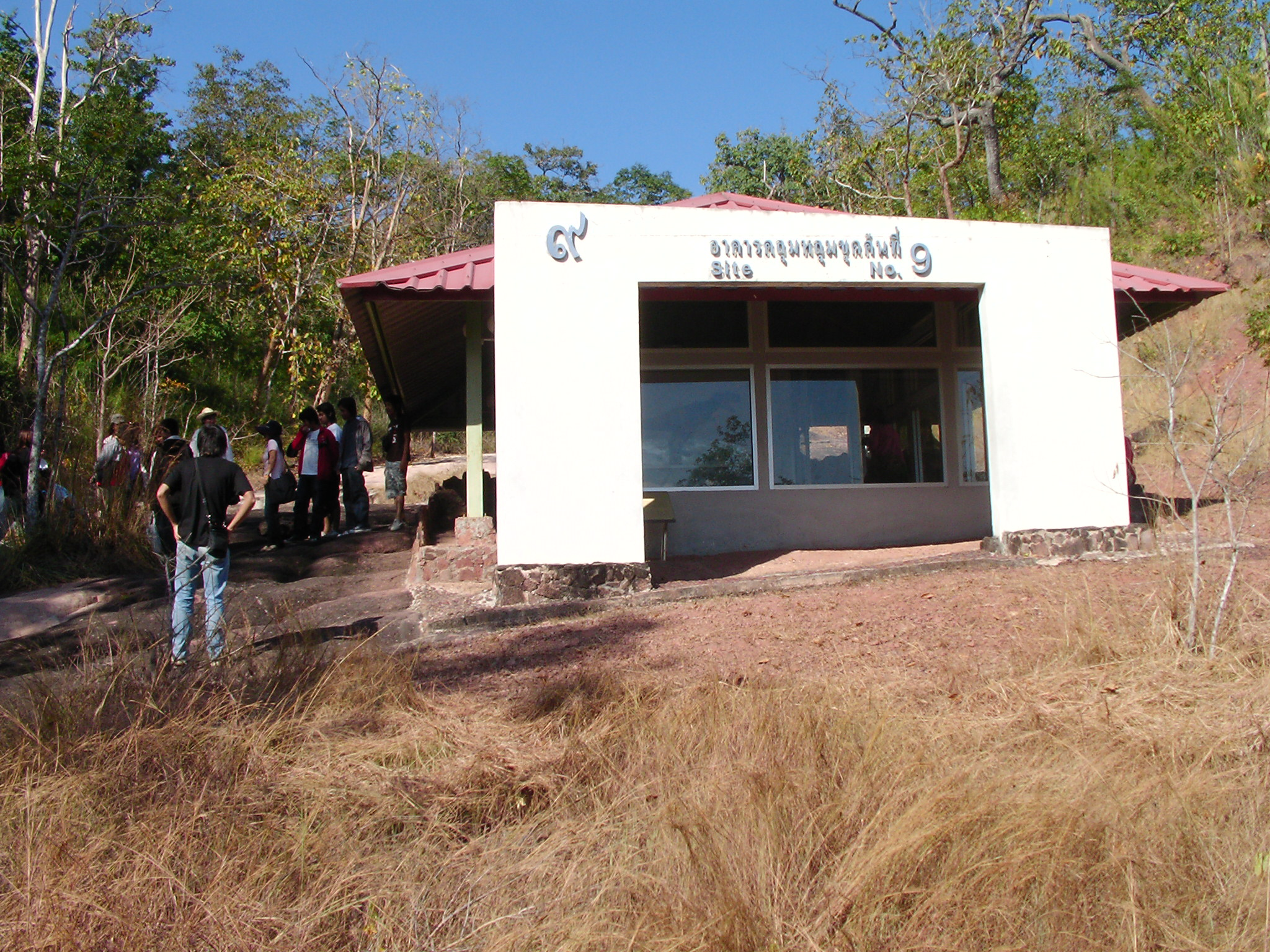
One of the tourist sites in Thailand that displays fossils unearthed in the country (Phu Wiang 9)

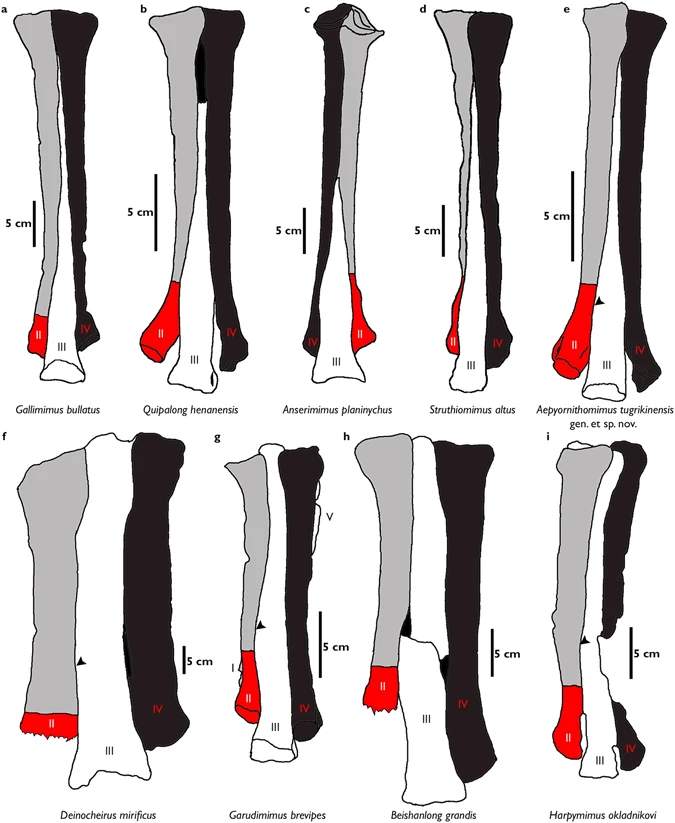
Diagrams of the metatarsals of several ornithomimosaurs, displaying the arctometatarsalian condition

Ornithomimosaur body fossils and ichnofossils were reported in Thailand's Khorat Plateau as early as 1997 in a publication by Eric Buffetaut and colleagues. At the time, only two dinosaur genera, Siamotyrannus and Phuwiangosaurus had been named from the country. Their report included a drawing of the metatarsals of an ornithomimosaur which had been uncovered at a locality called "Phu Wiang 5". These metatarsals clearly showed the derived arctometatasalian condition, similar to the ornithomimosaurs known from Laramidia. However, this specimen was not identified by any name other than the "Thai ornithomimosaur".

The next mention of the "Thai ornithomimosaur" was in the first edition of the Dinosaur Press magazine, which was published in Japan in 2000. In this publication, the taxon is referred to by the nomen nudum "Ginnareemimus" by Ryuichi Kaneko, who wrote an article in the magazine which contained recent information about paleontology in Thailand.

Kinnareemimus received a formal species description in 2009 when Eric Buffetaut, Varavudh Suteethorn, and Haiyan Tong published an anatomical monograph in the bulletin of the Geological Society of London. All the bones referable to ornithomimosaurs found at Phu Wiang 5 were disarticulated, and it is therefore impossible to know exactly how many individual animals were fossilized at the site. For this reason, when Kinnareemimus was described in 2009, only a single partial metatarsal III — designated PW5A-100 — was designated as the holotype. The remaining specimens were each given unique designations (from 101 to 131), and they were each referred to the new genus. Buffetaut and Suteethorn remark in their description that they are confident that all of the material belongs to a single species, but they conservatively did not include the anatomy of these bones in the species diagnosis.

When it was described, the authors named the genus after Kinnaree, a being from the folklore of the Thai people which has the head and torso of a woman and the legs of a bird and lives in the legendary Himmapan Forest. Buffetaut and Suteethorn remark that the choice of Kinnaree was in reference to the birdlike feet of Kinnareemimus.

== Description ==
Because the holotype of Kinnareemimus is so fragmentary (consisting of only a single metatarsal), estimates of the animal's size have always been highly speculative and uncertain. The authors who described the genus, Eric Buffetaut and colleagues, did not give an estimate of the animal's mass. They remarked that the ratio of the lengths between the tibia and the third metatarsal of Kinnareemimus is most similar to Garudimimus. They interpret this to mean that its body proportions may have been more similar to that genus than to derived genera like Gallimimus or Struthiomimus. It has subsequently been estimated by Molina-Pérez and Larramendi to have been about 1.8 metres (5.9 ft) long and would have possibly weighed around 13 kilograms (29 lb).

=== Holotype ===
List of specimens
Specimen	Includes
PW5A-100	distal portion of a left metatarsal III
PW5A-101	left metatarsal II
PW5A-102	proximal portion of a left metatarsal IV
PW5A-103	middle portion of a left metatarsal III
PW5A-104	proximal portion of a left metatarsal III
PW5A-105	most of a left metatarsal II
PW5A-106	right metatarsal IV
PW5A-107	distal portion of a right metatarsal III
PW5A-108	proximal portion of metatarsal IV
PW5A-109	proximal portion of metatarsal IV
PW5A-110	right tibia
PW5A-111	left tibia
PW5A-112	proximal portion of a left fibula
PW5A-113	proximal portion of a right pubis
PW5A-114	proximal portion of a left pubis
PW5A-115 to 121	pedal phalanges
PW5A-122	partial pedal phalanx with an ungual
PW5A-123	dorsal vertebral centrum
PW5A-124	partial caudal vertebra
PW5A-125	middle caudal vertebral centrum
PW5A-126 to 129	distal caudal vertebrae
PW5A-130	proximal caudal vertebral centrum
PW5A-131	proximal portion of a right metatarsal III

The holotype of Kinnareemimus (PW5A-100) is a partially complete third metatarsal that preserves the articular surface on the left side. The incompleteness of the specimen made it difficult for Buffetaut and colleagues to estimate the full size of the bone. However, another specimen (PW5A-101), is a second metatarsal of similar size and robustness, and is much more complete. The authors describing it believe it may have belonged to the same individual, and so they used it to estimate a full-length of the third metatarsal to have been roughly 145 millimetres (5.7 in) in life.

This specimen was used to diagnose Kinnareemimus as distinct from all other ornithomimosaurs based on the following apomorphies: a semi-arctometatarsalian condition where the third metatarsal is still visible in proximal view and which narrows in the distal direction before flaring into a wider triangular cross-section at the distal-most end. This diagnosis was amended in 2024 by Samathi to include ventrally flattened pedal unguals with flexor fossae, which supported the inclusion of Kinnareemimus within ornithomimosauria.

=== Referred specimens ===
Axial skeleton

The only parts of the axial skeleton of Kinnareemimus which are preserved are eight vertebrae from various parts of the spine (one putative dorsal vertebra and seven caudal vertebra). The single non-caudal vertebra (PW5A-124) was inferred to be a dorsal vertebra because it lacks the articular facets for chevrons, although this is not known for certain. The neural arch for the vertebra is not preserved and the portion of the bone missing corresponds to the location of the unfused sutures in an immature individual, which led the authors to suggest the specimen came from a juvenile individual.

The caudal vertebrae which are assigned to Kinnareemimus are from several distinct individuals. The centra are hourglass-shaped and hollow with no transverse processes, resembling the condition seen in Gallimimus. Some of the preserved vertebrae have differing cross-sectional shapes, and probably come from different sections of the tail. At least one (PW5A-130) may be a first caudal vertebra. The seven vertebrae preserved from other parts of the tail display varying degrees of fusion, indicating these specimens are from a multi-age assemblage.

Appendicular skeleton

Most of the remains discovered at Phu Wiang 5 are bones from the hind-limbs or hips of various individuals. Two partial pubic bones are preserved which are very slender in comparison to similarly sized pubic bones of similarly sized ornithomimosaurs. Buffetaut and colleagues remark that this may not be a true apomorphy but instead an artifact of the individuals' ontogeny.

Two tibiae were preserved in the type locality. They are similar in length and one is from a right leg and the other is from a left leg. However, they are believed to be from different individuals because of differences in robustness between the two which are possibly a result of ontogeny. The general shape of the tibiae resembles primitive ornithomimosaurs with few distinguishing features. The single fibula which is preserved is only partially complete and preserves a broad and deep groove along the shaft which resembles the condition in Gallimimus. The preserved phalanges are similar in shape to Garudimimus and Harpymimus, but they are more slender. The single partial toe claw that is preserved lacks a flexor tubercle, analogous to the third ungual in Struthiomimus.

The majority of the remains of Kinnareemimus are metatarsal bones, which come from the lower part of the leg just above the foot. The metatarsals of several individuals are known, which allows the metatarsus to be reconstructed with reasonable precision. A notable feature is the presence of an arctometatarsalian condition which is similar to that of derived ornithomimids and tyrannosauroids. However, the third metatarsal was not fully enclosed by the proximal ends of the second and fourth metatarsals, so it was not a true arctometatarsus.

== Classification ==
Although Kinnareemimus is relatively fragmentary, the available evidence from reconstructions of the metatarsals allows its relative evolutionary position within Ornithomimosauria. The development of the arctometatarsus is roughly linear within the phylogenetic topology of ornithomimosaurs. From this, it has been inferred that Kinnareemimus is in a more derived position than Garudimimus, but less derived than Ornithomimidae. However, Kinnareemimus is geologically much older than Garudimimus as well as Pelecanimimus and Harpymimus (also basal ornithomimosaurs), which suggests that the evolution of the arctometatarsus in ornithomimosaurs was not chronologically linear. Buffetaut and colleagues use this to suggest that a large amount of ornithomimosaur evolution has not yet been sampled. They do not conduct a phylogenetic analysis including Kinnareemimus in their description, but subsequent authors have attempted to do so.

In their phylogenetic work on theropods in 2014, Steve Brusatte and colleagues compiled a phylogenetic matrix using 152 taxa coded for 853 discrete characters. This matrix included data for Kinnareemimus, but the taxon had to be pruned from the final trees produced for the paper. The maximum-parsimony consensus tree produced in the supplemental materials with this paper included Kinnareemimus, and that tree failed to recover most maniraptoran clades as monophyletic. Subsequent analyses using this matrix, and other matrices, have pruned Kinnareemimus for similar reasons.

The first scientific paper to have included Kinnareemimus in its published trees with substantial resolution was in 2024 by Andrea Cau. The supplementary materials from that paper included dozens of consensus trees, some of which included Kinnareemimus. An abbreviated version of the trees published by Cau is shown below.

- Ornithomimosauria
  - Nqwebasaurus
  - - Deinocheirus
    - - Beishanlong
      - Garudimimus
      - Kinnareemimus
      - - Harpymimus
        - - Pelecanimimus
          - - Hexing
            - Shenzhousaurus
      - Ornithomimidae
        - - Anserimimus
          - Qiupalong
        - - Gallimimus
          - Ornithomimus

Shortly after the publication of Cau's theropod analysis in 2024, a paper was published by Adun Samathi which analyzed the phylogenetic position of Kinnareemimus. In his analysis, he remarks that there had been very little support for Kinnareemimus as an ornithomimosaur in the major phylogenetic analyses. Brusatte and colleagues (2014) remarked that it was probably a basal coelurosaur. Hartman and colleagues (2019) found it as a tyrannosauroid, but also support for it possibly representing an alvarezsauroid. To address the uncertainty in the literature up until this point, Samathi scored the anatomical data for Kinnareemimus within three independent theropod matrices. These were the matrices of Choiniere and colleagues (2012), McFeeters and colleagues (2016), and that of Hattori and colleagues (2023).

The three matrices recovered differing results. The matrix from Choiniere and colleagues, which was also modified by Samathi to include Deinocheirus, recovered Kinnareemimus as a basal member of Deinocheiridae. The matrix of McFeeters and colleagues recovered it as a non-macrocheiriform ornithomimosaur, and this result was also recovered by the matrix from Hattori and colleagues. Samathi was ultimately unable to resolve a confident position for the taxon other than that it is definitely not a member of Ornithomimidae. The final tree published in Samathi's work based on the Hattori matrix is shown below.

- Ornithomimosauria
  - Nqwebasaurus
  - - Beishanlong
    - Pelecanimimus
    - LH-02-01
    - - Kinnareemimus
      - Shenzhousaurus
      - Macrocheiriformes
        - Garudimimus
        - Deinocheiridae
        - Ornithomimidae

== Paleobiology ==
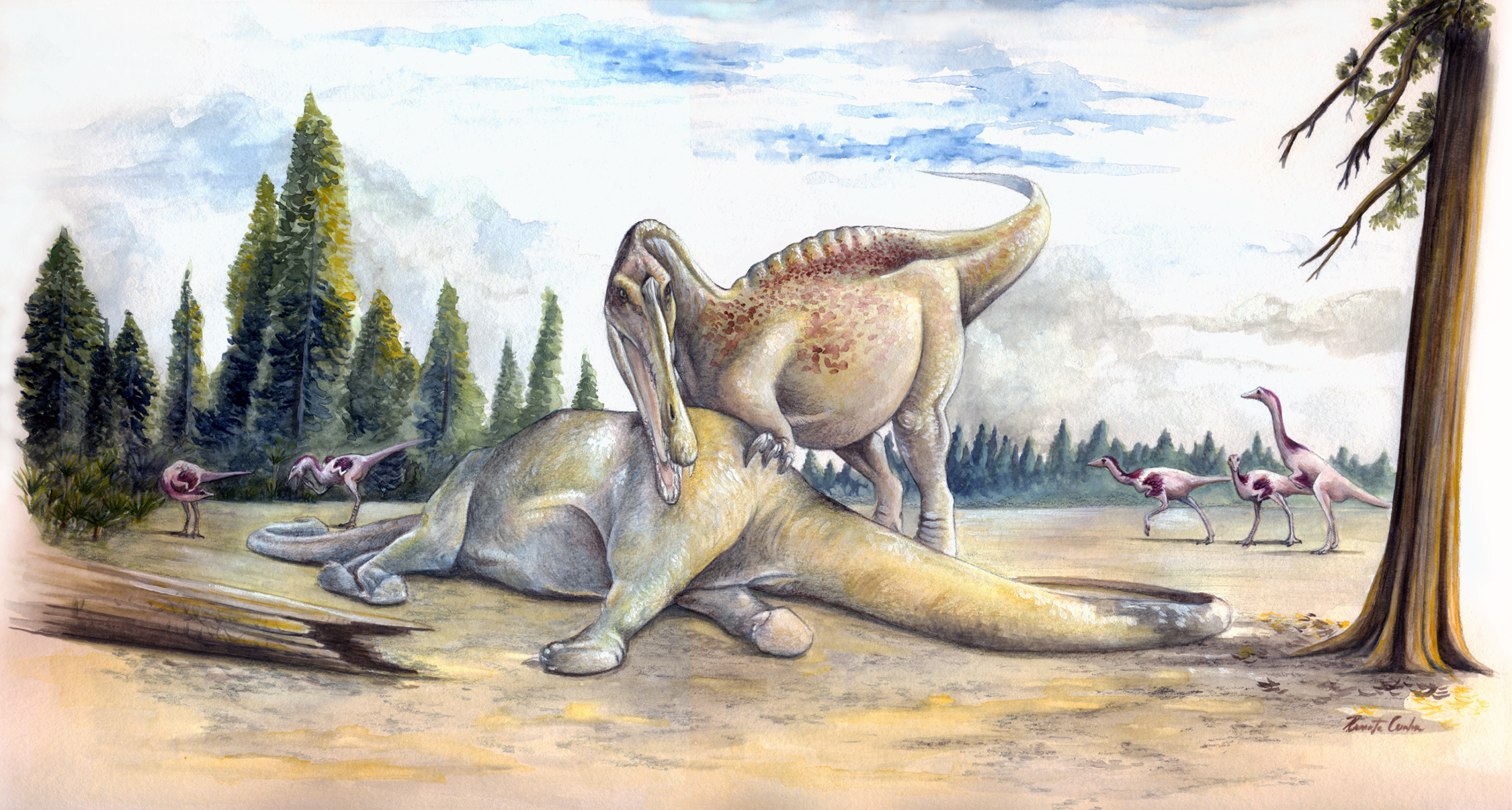
Restoration of a Kinnareemimus flock behind a spinosaur feeding on a sauropod carcass

In their description of Kinnareemimus, Buffetaut and colleagues attempted to assess the possible cursorial adaptations of the animal in life. The bones preserved enabled the authors to reconstruct most of a hind limb based on estimating the adult-size of the bones which were believed to have been from juveniles. The ratio between the lengths of the tibia and the metatarsus was previously established as a method of inferring cursoriality in other ornithomimosaurs. The estimated length of the tarsus in Kinnareemimus was comparable to the known remains of Garudimimus, and was substantially smaller than the ratios known from Struthiomimus and Gallimimus, which are believed to have been well-adapted for running.

However, the authors also remarked that the metatarsals of Kinnareemimus were much more slender than those of the closely related Archaeornithomimus, which may suggest that either the animal was not fully grown, or it may have acquired paedomorphic traits. They do not make any concrete hypotheses about the running abilities of Kinnareemimus.

== Paleoecology ==
=== Paleoenvironment ===
The Sao Khua Formation has thus far only yielded continental fossils, with no evidence of marine fossils or marine sediments. There have historically been reports of ichthyosaur and plesiosaur teeth from the Sao Khua Formation, but these have now been identified as belonging to crocodyliformes, which are mostly non-marine during the Cretaceous. The sediments of the Sao Khua Formation are composed of red clays, mudstones, sandstones, siltstones, and conglomerate rocks, which indicate a fluvial environment which also possessed lakes, floodplains, and braided channels.

=== Contemporary fauna ===
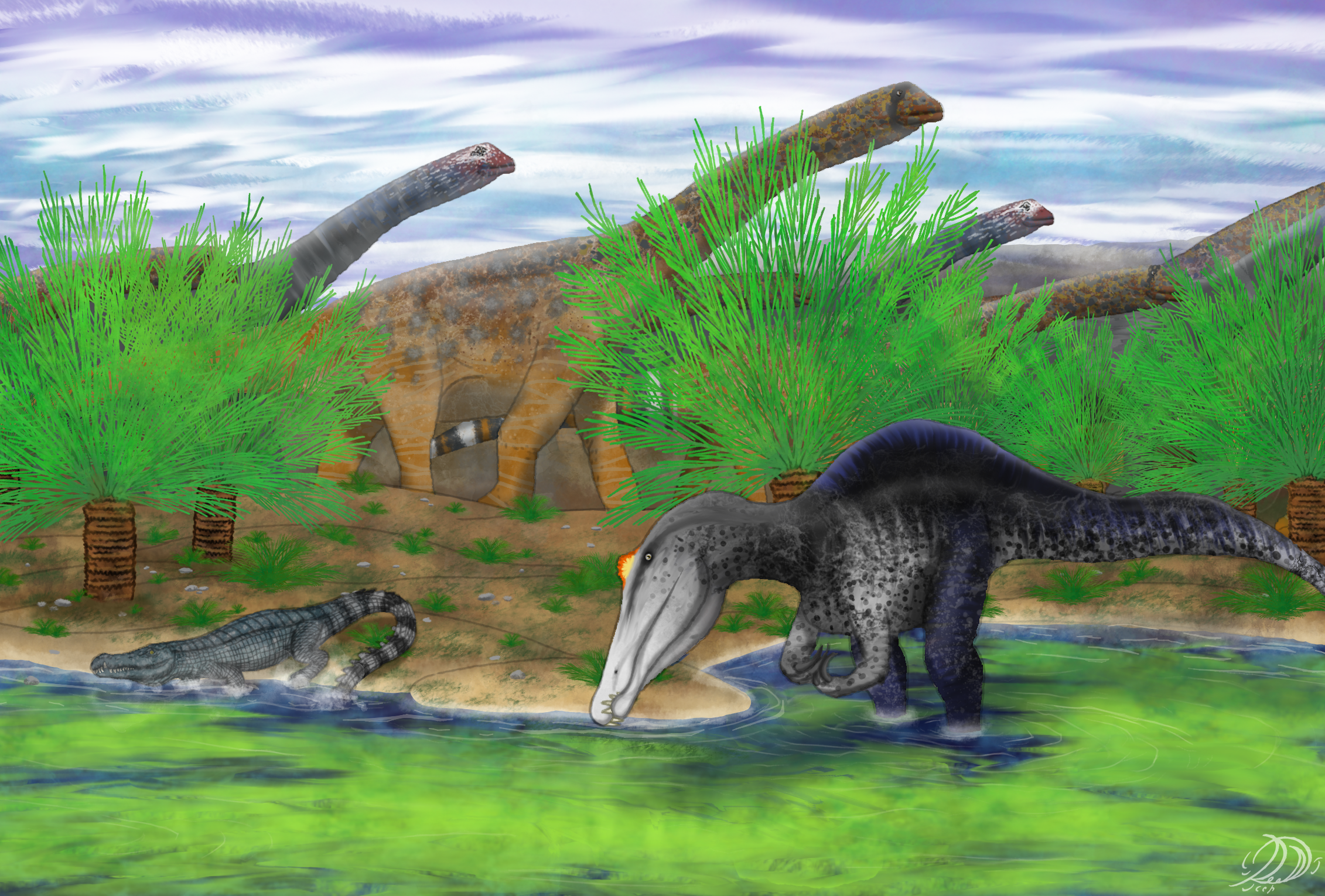
A reconstruction of several animals from the Sao Khua Formation in their natural environment

Of all the Mesozoic formations in northeastern Thailand, the Sao Khua has the most abundant and diverse vertebrate fossil record. The Phu Wiang 5 locality is specifically known to have included small, possibly juvenile, specimens of the sauropod Phuwiangosaurus. The spinosaurid Siamosaurus is also known from this locality from teeth.

The region was host to numerous other theropods, although it is not known confidently if any of these coexisted with Kinnareemimus specifically. These included the sympatric megaraptorans Phuwiangvenator and Vayuraptor, the large theropod Siamotyrannus, an unnamed spinosaurid (sometimes called "Phu Wiang spinosaurid B"), and an unnamed carcharodontosaurid. The area was also home to other small theropods including an unnamed ornithomimosaur, an unnamed compsognathid, and possible ornithurines. Sauropod remains are also known from the area that are believed to be distinct from Phuwiangosaurus, but none of them have been formally described or named. However, there have yet to be any ornithischians discovered from the formation.

Freshwater life is abundant in the Sao Khua Formation. These include the neosuchians Siamosuchus, Sunosuchus, and Theriosuchus, numerous species of turtles, amiiform fish, several hybodontiform sharks, and freshwater bivalves. There is also an indeterminate pterosaur known from the formation.

== See also ==
- 2009 in archosaur paleontology
- Aptian extinction
- Khorat Group
- List of Asian dinosaurs
- Paleontology in Thailand
- Timeline of ornithomimosaur research
