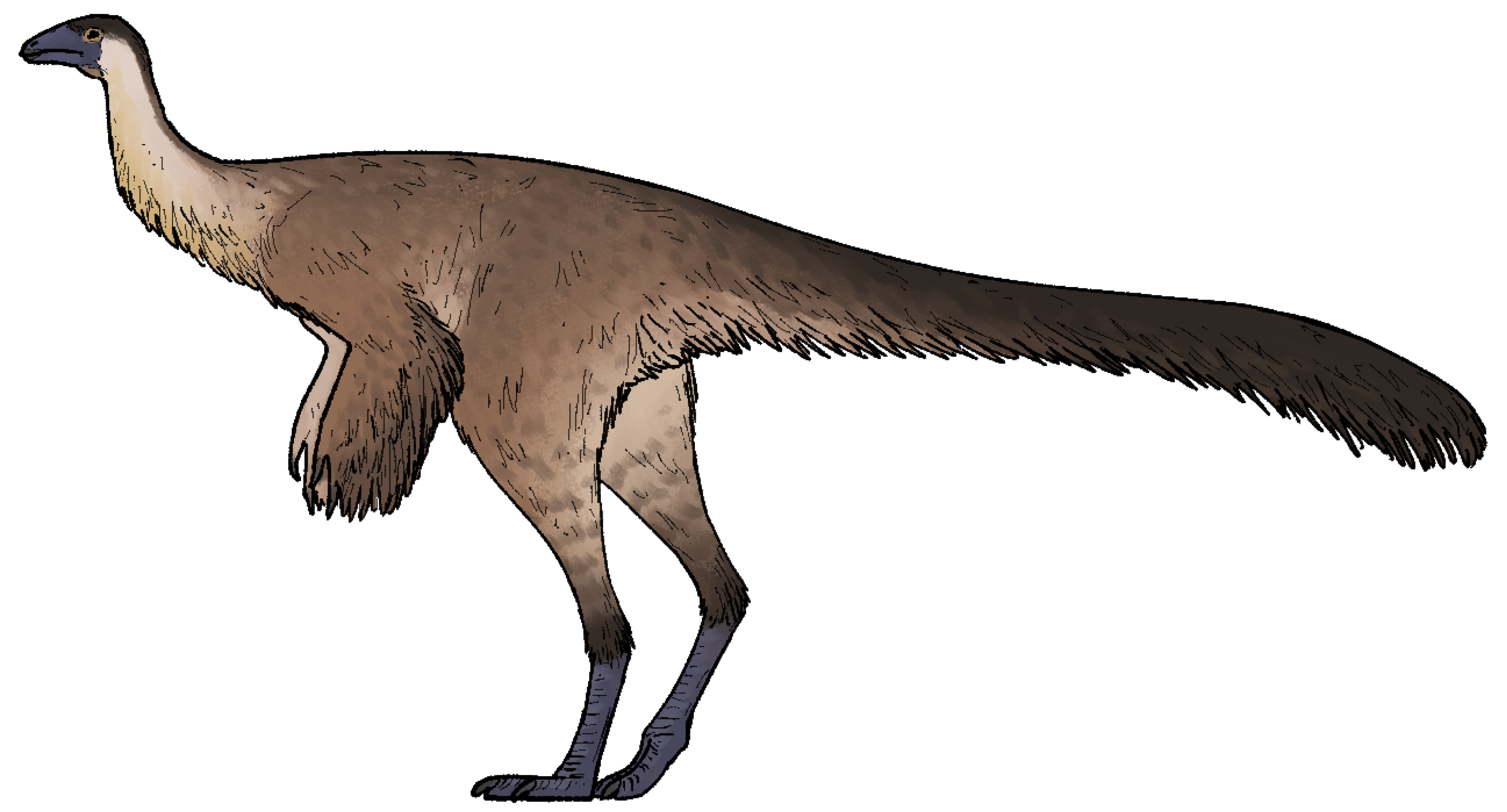
- Speculative life restoration

Scientific classification
- Kingdom: Animalia
- Phylum: Chordata
- Class: Reptilia
- Clade: Dinosauria
- Clade: Saurischia
- Clade: Theropoda
- Clade: †Ornithomimosauria
- Family: †Ornithomimidae
- Genus: †Dzharacursor; Averianov & Sues, 2025
- Species: †D. bissektensis

Binomial name
- †Dzharacursor bissektensis (Nesov, 1995)

= Dzharacursor =

Dzharacursor Temporal range: Late Cretaceous, upper Turonian

Genus of ornithomimid dinosaurs

Dzharacursor (meaning "Dzharakuduk runner") is a genus of ornithomimid theropod dinosaurs from the Late Cretaceous (Turonian age) Bissekty Formation of Uzbekistan. The type and only species is Dzharacursor bissektensis, originally assigned to the genus Archaeornithomimus.

== Discovery and naming ==
In 1995, Nesov named a new species of ornithomimosaur from the Bissekty Formation as Archaeornithomimus bissektensis, based on the holotype CCMGE 479/12457 (formerly N 479/12457), a femur of a juvenile individual, along with other referred specimens including the metatarsals. However, in subsequent studies, the affinity of A. bissektensis was generally doubted or not mentioned.

In 2025, Averianov & Sues assigned this taxon to the new genus Dzharacursor. The new generic name combines Dzharakuduk, the name of the locality where its fossils were found, with the Latin word cursor, meaning "runner". They also referred various partial cranial and postcranial materials of several individuals discovered from the same locality for a sufficient diagnosis. These include cranial bones (a premaxilla, frontal, and quadrate), several cervical, dorsal, and caudal vertebrae, sacra, pectoral and pelvic girdles, forelimb bones (humeri, ulnae, metacarpals, phalanges, and unguals), and hindlimb bones (femora, tibiae, fibulae, metatarsals, phalanges, and unguals), most of which were described by Sues & Averianov in 2016.

== Classification ==
In their phylogenetic analyses, Averianov & Sues (2025) recovered Dzharacursor as a basal member of the Ornithomimidae, more derived than Archaeornithomimus. Their results are displayed in the cladogram below:

- Ornithomimosauria
  - Nqwebasaurus
  - - Beishanlong
    - Harpymimus
    - Pelecanimimus
    - Shenzhousaurus
    - Tyrannomimus
    - - Garudimimus
      - Deinocheirus
    - Ornithomimidae
      - Archaeornithomimus
      - - Dzharacursor
        - - Sinornithomimus
          - - Gallimimus
            - - Struthiomimus
              - - Anserimimus
                - Ornithomimus edmontonicus

== Paleobiology ==
A femur (ZIN PH 1400/16) referred to Dzharacursor may preserve medullary bone, a type of endosteal bone tissue found in the bones of female birds when preparing to lay eggs. Similar tissues are found in other non-avian dinosaurs and pterosaurs. Based on the size of the individual whose femur was sampled, the presence of this tissue type may indicate that Dzharacursor females reached sexual maturity before somatic maturity.

== Paleoecology ==
Dzharacursor coexisted in the Bissekty Formation environment with other theropods, including the carcharodontosaurian Ulughbegsaurus, the tyrannosauroid Timurlengia, and the dromaeosaurid Itemirus.
