= Hexing =

Hexing Temporal range: Early Cretaceous, 125 Ma

Scientific classification
- Kingdom: Animalia
- Phylum: Chordata
- Class: Reptilia
- Clade: Dinosauria
- Clade: Saurischia
- Clade: Theropoda
- Clade: †Ornithomimosauria
- Genus: †Hexing; Jin, Chen & Godefroit, 2012

Type species
- †Hexing qingyi Jin, Chen & Godefroit, 2012

Extinct genus of dinosaurs

Hexing is an extinct genus of basal ornithomimosaurian dinosaur known from the Early Cretaceous of northeastern China. It contains a single species, Hexing qingyi.

== Discovery and naming ==
In the early twenty-first century, a local farmer at Xiaobeigou in Liaoning discovered the skeleton of a small theropod. He prepared the fossil himself, trying to enhance its value by restoring damaged bones and adding fake parts. Eventually the specimen was obtained by the Geological Museum of Jilin University and more expertly prepared, during which process the added parts were again removed.

In 2012, the type species Hexing qingyi was named and described by Jin Liyong, Chen Jun and Pascal Godefroit. The generic name means "like a crane" in Chinese. The specific name means "with slender wings".

The holotype, JLUM-JZ07b1, was found in fluvial deposits of the lower Yixian Formation, which have a highest possible age of 139 million years and a lowest of 128 million years and thus date from some time in the early Valanginian to early Barremian stage. It consists of a partial skeleton, containing the skull, the lower jaws, a series of five cervical vertebrae, the shoulder girdle and the majority of both forelimbs and hindlimbs. The remains have not been well preserved. The specimen represents a subadult or adult individual.

== Description ==
The holotype specimen consists of the remains of a small individual. Because most of the vertebral column is absent, its body length cannot be directly determined, but a comparison can be made with the previously smallest known ornithomimosaur, the 1.6 metres long Shenzhousaurus, which has a thighbone length of 191 millimetres, while the femur length of Hexing is 135 millimetres. Such a small body size was among ornithomimosaurs up till now only known from juveniles but the holotype is not a young animal as is shown by the complete fusion of the skull bones, the neck ribs, the scapulocoracoid and the ankle bones.

The describers determined some autapomorphies of Hexing, its unique derived traits. The snout tip reaches downwards in front of the lower jaws, so deeply that the roof of the mouth at this point is at a level with the bottom edge of the lower jaw. The fossa antorbitalis, a depression on the side of the maxilla, covers almost the entire outer surface of that bone. The parietal bones are joint at their midline in a crest. The large bone extensions at the back of the skull, the processus paroccipitales, are hanging down below the level of the foramen magnum. In the lower jaw, the dentary has an opening in its side. The formula for the phalanges of the hand is 1-2-3-0-0 or 2-3-3-0-0 — or 0-1-2-3-0/0-2-2-3-0 if the three fingers of the hand are interpreted as the second, third and fourth. The upper phalanges of the second and third (or third and fourth) finger are elongated with more than 75% of the length of the corresponding metacarpal. The lower leg is relatively long with the tibiotarsus having 137% of the length of the thighbone.

The skull of Hexing is relatively large with a length of 136 millimetres. It is elongated and triangular in side view. The snout is appending with a slight kink above the middle of the fossa antorbitalis, which at this point is reinforced by a distinctive vertical bone strut, a pila interfenestralis dividing the depression in two halves: at its rear an oval skull opening, the fenestra antorbitalis, pierces the surface and at its front the uniquely large and deep hollowing out of the maxilla side is visible, in which another opening, the fenestra maxillaris, might have been present, though this is uncertain because of damage. The front of the snout consists of a small praemaxilla, continuing the line of the nasals downwards and forming a small upper beak in front of the lower jaws. The beak is separated by a low notch from the lower maxilla edge, which is toothless.

The front of the lower jaw is low and slightly upward curving. In the left dentary the remains of three or four low conical teeth are visible; of these damage obscures most detail. The dentary has a small opening in the side surface. The higher back of the lower jaw seems to show a much larger opening, but this is an artefact caused by the original inexpert preparation damaging the thin bone surface of an extensive mandibular fossa. A real and much smaller external mandibular fenestra is present in front of this. Neither the lower jaw nor the upper jaw form cutting edges.

The cervical vertebrae are elongated with low spines. They are pneumatised and have large triangular diapophyses and postzygapophyses.

The shoulder blade is elongated and narrow, without expanded upper end. The humerus is somewhat shorter than the shoulder blade and is slender. Its shaft is not twisted. The bones of the lower arm are likewise elegant and straight. A large part of the over ten centimetres long hand has been preserved; this shows a configuration that is fundamentally different from that of related species. The describers have carefully checked whether this could have been caused by falsifications during the original preparation but could find no sign of any tampering. As a result, the identification of the respective parts is highly problematical. As preserved the hand shows three rows of elements: the first with two bones and the second and third with four bones. If these would represent both phalanges and metacarpals, these series should have three, four and five elements, however: from the first and third row a bone is missing. The authors considered it most likely that in the first finger the upper phalanx was completely reduced, that is: naturally absent. However, as this would imply that the claw attached directly to the metacarpal and this metacarpal would then be exceptionally long, they allowed for the alternative possibility that the visible element was the first phalanx and that the metacarpal was lacking because of an incompleteness of the fossil. In the third finger the number of phalanges seemed almost certainly reduced from four to three because the place of the two normal short upper phalanges is taken by a single long element. The description of this situation is complicated by the fact that the describers follow the hypothesis of Xu Xing that with Tetanurae — including birds and Hexing — the first, second and third fingers are actually the second, third and fourth. This would in the standard terminology make the formula of the phalanges 1-3-3-0-0 or alternatively 2-3-3-0-0 and following the hypothesis of Xu 0-1-3-3-0 or 0-2-3-3-0. In general the phalanges are slender and elongated. The hand claws are relatively large and curved, with a flatter underside.

The thighbone is strongly curved, with a convex anterior end. The tibia is 185 millimetres long and thus very elongated compared with the femur; only some juvenile ornithomimid specimens have relatively longer tibiotarsi. The first metatarsal is half as long as the second, the longest of the foot. The foot claws are flatter than the hand claws.

== Phylogeny ==
The describers assigned Hexing a basal position in the Ornithomimosauria. Their phylogenetic analysis found Hexing to be more derived than Pelecanimimus, but less derived than a clade consisting of Beishanlong, Harpymimus, Garudimimus and the Ornithomimidae. Shenzhousaurus, also from the Yixian Formation, was found in a polytomy with Hexing and this clade, as shown by the following cladogram:

- Ornithomimosauria
  - Pelecanimimus
  - unnamed
    - Hexing
    - Shenzhousaurus
    - unnamed
      - Beishanlong
      - Harpymimus
      - unnamed
        - Garudimimus
        - Ornithomimidae

The small forms Hexing and Senzhousaurus are the oldest known ornithomimosaurians, as Pelecanimimus dates from the late Barremian. Because this latter species is more basal, the authors considered this a strong indication that a land bridge had formed between Europe and Asia long before the Aptian, the normally assumed date for this event.

== See also ==
- Timeline of ornithomimosaur research
