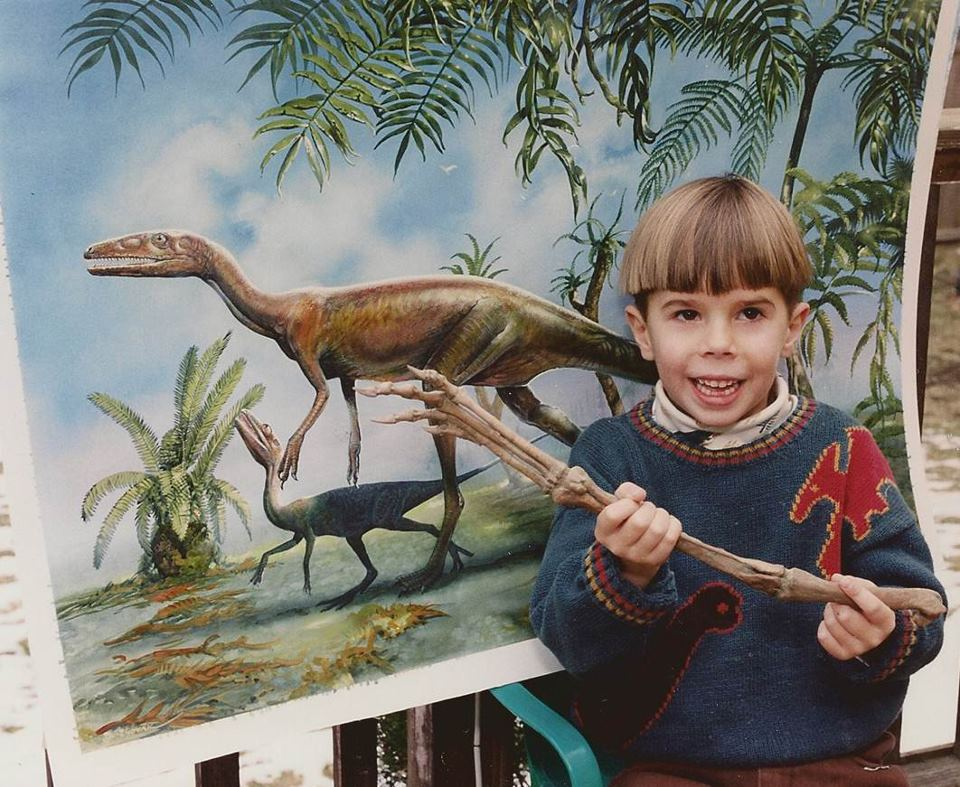
- Six-year-old Justin Hofmann holding the hindlimb of his namesake dinosaur, Nedcolbertia justinhofmanni

Scientific classification
- Kingdom: Animalia
- Phylum: Chordata
- Class: Reptilia
- Clade: Dinosauria
- Clade: Saurischia
- Clade: Theropoda
- Clade: †Ornithomimosauria
- Genus: †Nedcolbertia; Kirkland et al., 1998

Type species
- †Nedcolbertia justinhofmanni Kirkland et al., 1998

= Nedcolbertia =

Nedcolbertia Temporal range: Valanginian, 139–134 Ma

Extinct genus of dinosaurs

Nedcolbertia is a genus of theropod dinosaur from the Early Cretaceous (Valanginian-aged) Cedar Mountain Formation of Utah. The type and only described species so far is N. justinhofmanni, known from at least three partial skeletons.

== Discovery and naming ==
Three skeletons of a theropod were discovered in 1993 by Christopher Whittle near Cisco in the basal Yellow Cat Member of the Cedar Mountain Formation of Utah, dating to the Valanginian. These were subsequently studied and reported in 1995 by Kirkland, Britt, Madsen and Burge. Though in 1996 it had been announced that the taxon would be named "Nedcolbertia whittlei", in 1998 it was actually described and named by Kirkland, Whittle, Britt, Madsen and Burge as the type species Nedcolbertia justinhofmanni. The generic name honours the American palaeontologist Edwin Harris Colbert, known as "Ned" to his friends. The specific name honoured Justin Hofmann, a six-year-old school boy from Newton, New Jersey, a participant of a contest for children by Discover Card, the winner having a dinosaur named after him.

== Description ==
Drawing of a Nedcolbertia

The holotype, CEUM 5071, is one of the specimens, a partial skeleton lacking the skull. It belonged to a juvenile individual. The paratypes are the other two specimens: CEUM 5072 and CEUM 5073, both fragmentary skeletons again lacking the skull. They represent subadult individuals. All three specimens were disarticulated and heavily eroded, having been exposed at the surface before discovery. They are part of the collection of the College of Eastern Utah Prehistoric Museum.

The holotype of Nedcolbertia had a length of about 1.5 metres (4 ft 11 in). The paratypes, though not yet full-grown, were about 3 metres (9.8 ft). Due to the condition of the remains, information on the species is limited. The vertebrae were not heavily pneumatised. The thumb claw was much larger than the second claw of the hand. The pubic bone carried a large "foot" with a very small or absent anterior process but a large posterior process. The thigh bone had a lesser trochanter that was clearly lower than the greater trochanter; the fourth trochanter was well-developed. The foot was not arctometatarsal. An enlarged second foot claw was lacking.

The describers assigned Nedcolbertia with certainty to the Tetanurae and provisionally to the Coelurosauria. A 2016 overview of ornithomimosaur material from the Arundel Formation of Maryland found Nedcolbertia to be an ornithomimosaur based on comparisons with the Arundel ornithomimosaur remains, Harpymimus, and Nqwebasaurus. In 2024, Cau suggested that Nedcolbertia possibly belongs to Allosauroidea, but included this taxon within Megalosauroidea in his phylogenetic analysis instead.
