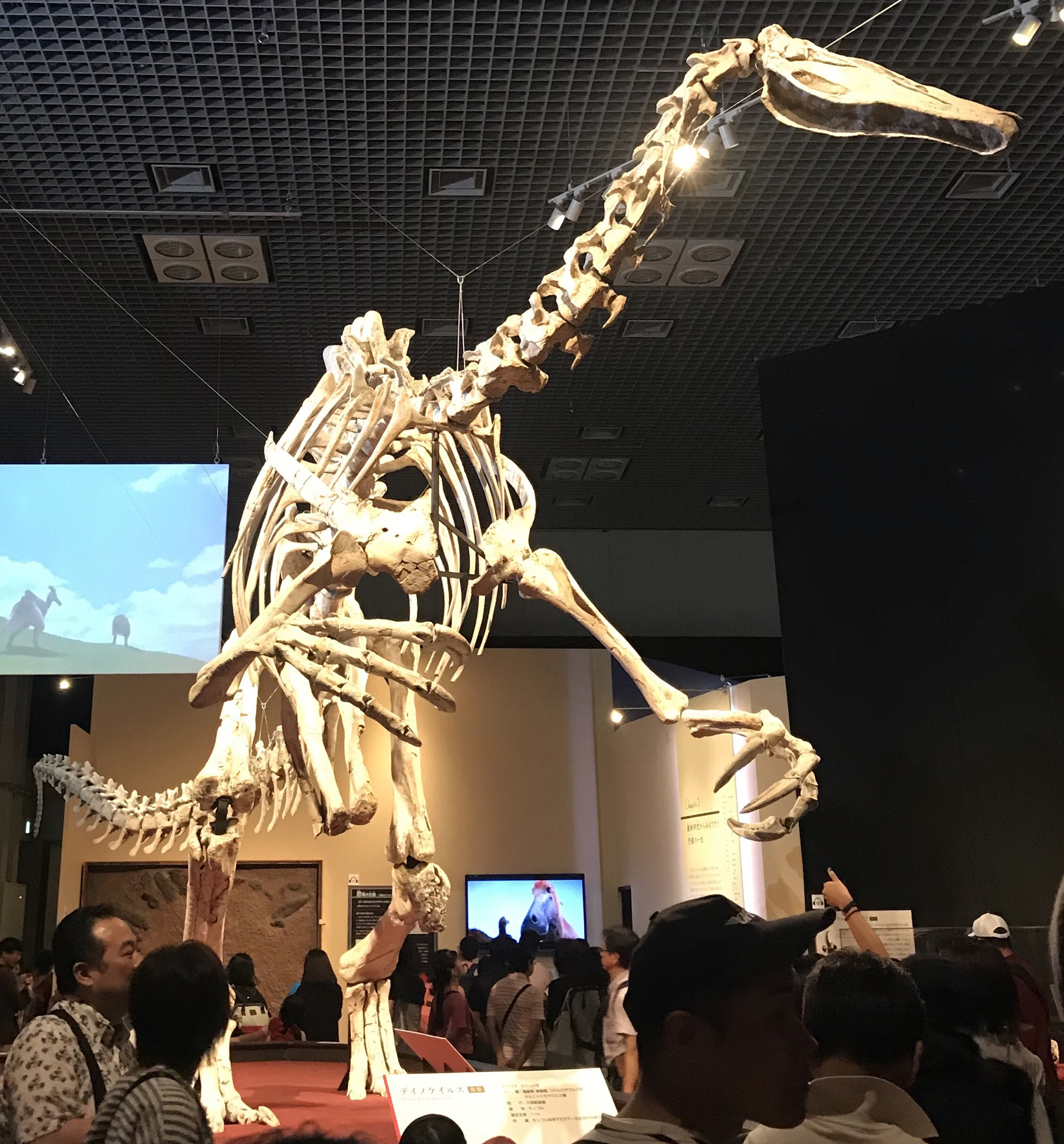
- Deinocheirus Skeletal mount

Scientific classification
- Kingdom: Animalia
- Phylum: Chordata
- Class: Reptilia
- Clade: Dinosauria
- Clade: Saurischia
- Clade: Theropoda
- Clade: †Ornithomimosauria
- Superfamily: †Ornithomimoidea
- Family: †Deinocheiridae; Osmólska & Roniewicz, 1970

Type species
- †Deinocheirus mirificus Osmólska & Roniewicz, 1970

Genera
- †Aviatyrannis?; †Beishanlong?; †Deinocheirus; †Garudimimus?; †Harpymimus?; †Hexing?; †Paraxenisaurus; †Tyrannomimus

Synonyms
- Garudimimidae Barsbold, 1981?; Harpymimidae Barsbold & Perle, 1984?

= Deinocheiridae =

Deinocheirids Temporal range: Early to Late Cretaceous, Aptian–Maastrichtian

Extinct family of dinosaurs

Deinocheiridae is an extinct family of ornithomimosaurian dinosaurs, living in Asia and North America from the Aptian until the Maastrichtian, with a possible Late Jurassic record in Europe. The family was originally named by Halszka Osmólska and Roniewicz in 1970, including only the type genus Deinocheirus. In a 2014 study by Yuong-Nam Lee and colleagues and published in the journal Nature, it was found that Deinocheiridae was a valid family. Lee et al. found that based on a new phylogenetic analysis including the recently discovered complete skeletons of Deinocheirus, the type genus, as well as Garudimimus and Beishanlong, could be placed as a successive group, with Beishanlong as the most primitive and Deinocheirus as most derived. The family Garudimimidae, named in 1981 by Rinchen Barsbold, is now a junior synonym of Deinocheiridae as the latter family includes the type genus of the former. The group existed from 115 to 69 million years ago, with Beishanlong living from 115 to 100 mya, Garudimimus living from 98 to 83 mya, and Deinocheirus living from 71 to 69 mya. Other genera included are Paraxenisaurus, and possibly Harpymimus and Hexing.

== Description ==
Deinocheiridae can be diagnosed by the fact that their lower arm bones are well separated, the flexor tubercles of their manual claws are positioned closer to the attachment point, and the cnemial crest of the tibia sticks out prominently toward the front and top. Unlike ornithomimids, they do not have an arctometatarsalian condition in their feet; however, like ornithomimids, they are toothless.

== Classification ==
When originally named, Halszka Osmólska and Ewa Roniewicz, found that Deinocheirus was a carnosaurian, and because of its extremely unusual arms, named the monotypic family Deinocheiridae for it. Osmólska and Roniewicz found that Deinocheiridae could be placed within the superfamily Megalosauroidea, within the infraorder Carnosauria (Carnosauria at the time was a paraphyletic group of all large theropods). Previously, the only carnosaurian from that time and place in Asia was the tyrannosaurid Tarbosaurus.

Osmólska and Roniewicz diagnosed Deinocheiridae, based on the only genus of the time in the family, Deinocheirus. Their diagnosis was "Gigantic carnivorous dinosaurs with long, slender scapula and long fore limbs; manus with three, uniformly developed fingers, ending in strong, large claws". Based on Deinocheirus again, the temporal range and distribution for the family was found limited to the Upper Cretaceous of the Upper Nemegt Formation of the Gobi Desert, Mongolia. Osmólska and Roniewicz noted, however, that the features of this family were very similar to those of Ornithomimus, but kept them separate on the possibility of convergence.

Rinchen Barsbold used this family as potentially valid, and in 1976, named the infraorder Deinocheirosauria for it. Within the infraorder he placed Deinocheiridae and Therizinosauridae, finding reason for the families to be united. In 1983, Barsbold elaborated, mentioning features uniting deinocheirids and therizinosaurids, mainly in the region of the hand and forelimb. He hypothesized that deinocheirosaurs would have had moderately-sized skull even though they were gigantic in size. Deinocheirus was mentioned and diagnosed as the only deinocheirid, while Therizinosaurus was mentioned to be the only therizinosaurid.

Jacques Gauthier, in 1986, found that Deinocheiridae was synonymous with Ornithomimidae. He used Ornithomimidae as a similar group to Ornithomimosauria, including Elaphrosaurus (a non-coelurosaurian), Ajancingenia (then Ingenia; an oviraptorid), Ornithomimus, Struthiomimus, Archaeornithomimus, Gallimimus, Dromiceiomimus, Garudimimus and Deinocheirus.

In a 2014 study by Yuong-Nam Lee and his colleagues, describing new specimens of Deinocheirus, it was found that the genus was indeed a close relative of Ornithomimus, and that the family Deinocheiridae was valid and not monotypic. Lee et al. analysed the new specimens, which showed very distinct features, and found that the genera Garudimimus and Beishanlong, previously classified as close relatives of, although more primitive than, Ornithomimidae, could be grouped together in Deinocheiridae. As Garudimimus was strongly supported to be in the family as the closest relative of Deinocheirus, the family Garudimimidae, named in 1981 by Barsbold, one of the coauthors of the Lee et al. paper, is now a junior synonym of Deinocheiridae. Lee et al. gave Deinocheiridae it first and only definition: "Deinocheirus mirificus and all taxa sharing a more recent common ancestor with it than Ornithomimus velox". The cladogram published by Lee et al. and including the new material of Deinocheirus, is shown below in a simplified form.

- Coelurosauria
  - Zuolong
  - - Tanycolagreus
    - - Tyrannosauroidea
      - - Ornitholestes
        - - Compsognathidae
          - Maniraptoriformes
            - Ornithomimosauria
              - Nqwebasaurus
              - - Pelecanimimus
                - - Shenzhousaurus
                  - - Harpymimus
                    - - Deinocheiridae
                        - Beishanlong
                        - - Garudimimus
                          - Deinocheirus
                      - Ornithomimidae
                        - Anserimimus
                        - - Gallimimus
                          - - Ornithomimus
                            - Struthiomimus
            - Maniraptora

In the 2019 description of Hesperornithoides, Deinocheirus was recovered as more basal than Garudimimus in a clade with Hexing and a Deinocheirid placement for Garudimimus was considered unlikely, requiring 14 more steps.
