= Shinekhudag Formation =

Geological formation in Dundgov, Mongolia

- Stratigraphic range: Barremian-Aptian, ~123.8–118.5 Ma
- Type: Geological formation
- Underlies: Khukhtek Formation
- Overlies: Tsagaantsav Svita

Lithology
- Primary: Sandstone, argillite, marl, clay

Location
- Region: Dundgov
- Country: Mongolia

The Shinekhudag Formation (also known as Shinekhudug Formation, Shinekhudag or Shinekhudukskaya Svita) is a geological formation in Dundgov, Mongolia whose strata date back to the Early Cretaceous. Dinosaur remains have been recovered from it. It has classically been considered Aptian-Albian in age. Khand et al. (2000) suggested that the age of formation is Berriasian-Hauterivian based on ostracod biostratigraphy. But, Hasegawa et al. (2018) suggested Shinekhudag Formation was deposited between 123.8 ±2.0 Ma and 118.5 ±0.9 Ma of the Barremian-early Aptian.

== Vertebrate paleofauna ==
| Color key: Taxon / Reclassified taxon / Taxon falsely reported as present / Dubious taxon or junior synonym / Ichnotaxon / Ootaxon / Morphotaxon | Notes; Uncertain or tentative taxa are in small text; ~~crossed out~~ taxa are discredited. |

=== Dinosaurs ===
Trackways of theropods and sauropods have been reported.

| Genus | Species | Location | Stratigraphic Position | Material | Notes | Images |
|---|---|---|---|---|---|---|
| Harpymimus | H. okladnikovi | Khuren Dukh | | "Partial skull with incomplete skeleton." | A primitive ornithomimosaur. | |
| Iguanodon | I. orientalis | Khamarin-Khural | | "Fragmentary skeleton." | A dubious iguanodont of uncertain affinities. | |
| Psittacosaurus sp. | Indeterminate | Khuren Dukh | | "Partial skeletons." | A primitive ceratopsian. | |

== See also ==
- List of dinosaur-bearing rock formations
