= Zonggo Formation =

Geologic formation in Tibet, China

- Stratigraphic range: Late Cretaceous
- Type: Geological formation

Location
- Region: Asia

The Zonggo Formation is a geological formation in Tibet whose strata date back to the Late Cretaceous. Dinosaur remains are among the fossils that have been recovered from the formation.

== Vertebrate paleofauna ==
- Megacervixosaurus tibetensis
- Ornithomimosauria indet.

== See also ==
- List of dinosaur-bearing rock formations
