= Kirky =

Kirky may refer to:

- Kirkintilloch, a town in Dunbartonshire, Scotland
- Kirkliston, a town in West Lothian, Scotland
- Nqwebasaurus, a genus of dinosaur
