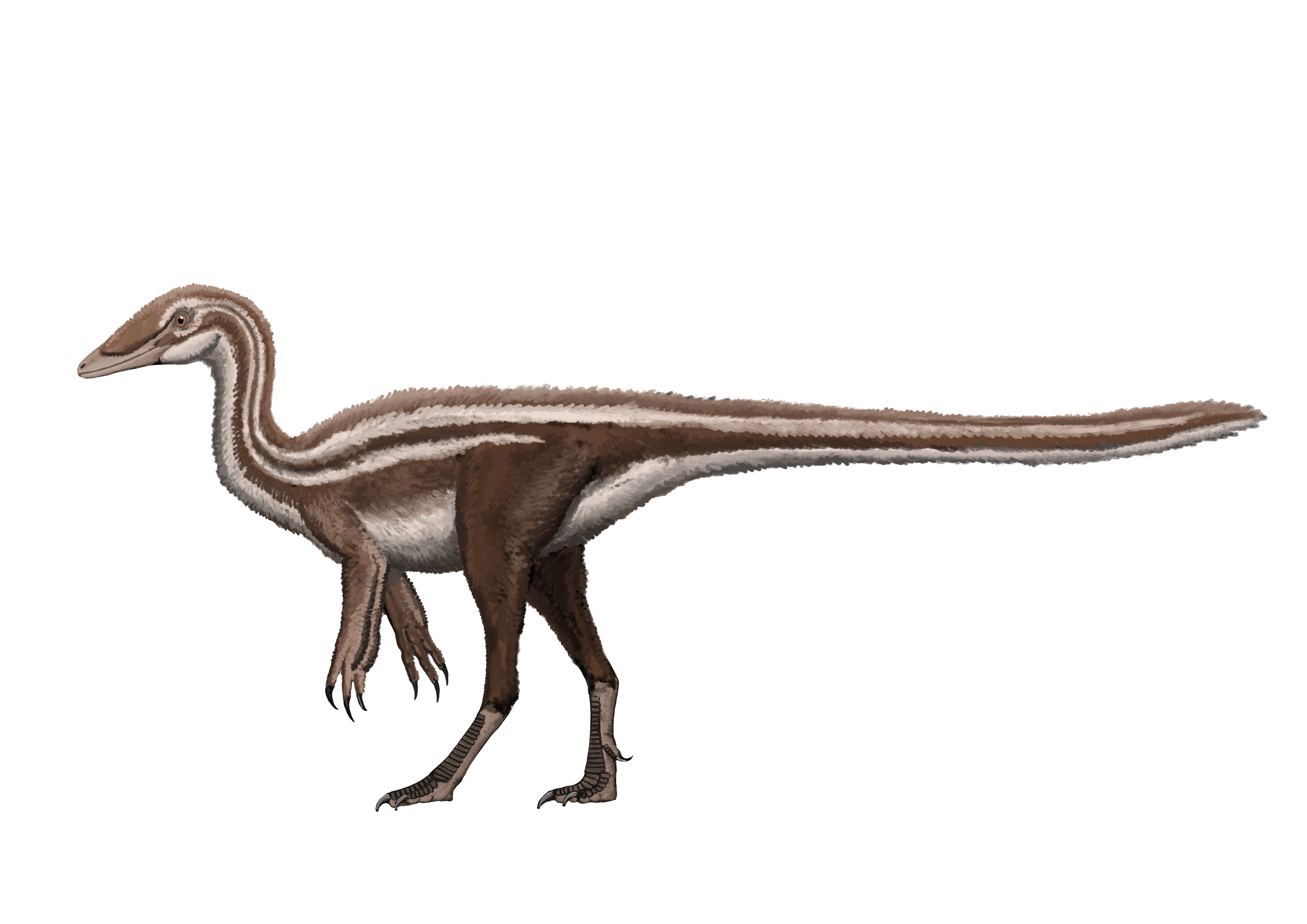
- Life restoration

Scientific classification
- Kingdom: Animalia
- Phylum: Chordata
- Class: Reptilia
- Clade: Dinosauria
- Clade: Saurischia
- Clade: Theropoda
- Clade: †Ornithomimosauria
- Genus: †Nqwebasaurus de Klerk et al., 2000
- Species: †N. thwazi

Binomial name
- †Nqwebasaurus thwazi de Klerk et al., 2000

= Nqwebasaurus =

Nqwebasaurus Temporal range: Early Cretaceous, 140 Ma

Extinct genus of dinosaur

Nqwebasaurus is a probable ornithomimosaurian theropod from the Early Cretaceous of South Africa. The genus contains a single species, Nqwebasaurus thwazi, representing the oldest known coelurosaur in Africa and the evidence for basal coelurosaurian dinosaurs inhabiting Gondwana since the earliest Cretaceous period.

== History of discovery ==
The type specimen of Nqwebasaurus was discovered from the Kirkwood Formation of the Uitenhage Group by William J. de Klerk of the Albany Museum and Callum Ross of the Stony Brook University in July 1996 during a joint expedition. The fossil is remarkably complete and is considered an extremely rare find as no coelurosaur fossils had previously been found in Africa at this time. It has an unofficial nickname "Kirky", since it was found in the Kirkwood Formation.

The name Nqwebasaurus is derived from the Xhosa word Nqweba which is the local name for the Kirkwood district, and thwazi is ancient Xhosa for "fast runner".

== Description ==
Size comparison

Nqwebasaurus is considered to have been a small to medium-sized coelurosaur. The type specimen is approximately 30 cm (1 ft) high and is estimated to have been 90 cm (3 ft) long, although its complete length is not known due to the caudal vertebrae of the type specimen being incomplete. Gregory S. Paul estimated its adult size at 1 m (3.3 ft) in length and 1 kg (2.2 lb) in body mass. In addition the type specimen is thought to be a late juvenile, although with the type specimen being the only fossil representing its species it is currently not possible to compare the fossil with another member of its species.

Nqwebasaurus has a long, three-fingered hand which includes a partially opposable thumb with a recurved claw. The claws on its hands differ in shape where the claws of the first and second digits are recurved and the third claw is not. This trait is unusual in theropod dinosaurs, however, it has been observed in some ornithomimosaurs such as Struthiomimus. Nqwebasaurus also lacks serrations on its maxillary teeth, has a reduced dentition, and contains gastroliths in its abdominal cavity, which is unusual for carnivorous theropod dinosaurs, as gastroliths are more commonly found in herbivorous vertebrates and modern ostriches.

== Classification ==
The most recent phylogenetic analyses that include Nqwebasaurus recovered it in the position as the basalmost member of Ornithomimosauria. However, many older studies have recovered different positions for the taxon amongst Coelurosauria, ranging from a basal member of the group, a compsognathid, or an alvarezsaurid. In combination with the rather divergent anatomy of Nqwebasaurus in comparison to other ornithomimosaurs, it is potentially uncertain what the taxon's phylogenetic affinities may be. Some later studies have uncritically supported the ornithomimosaurian affinities of Nqwebasaurus.

The cladogram below follows an analysis by Yuong-Nam Lee, Rinchen Barsbold, Philip J. Currie, Yoshitsugu Kobayashi, Hang-Jae Lee, Pascal Godefroit, François Escuillié & Tsogtbaatar Chinzorig. The analysis was published in 2014, and displays the current phylogenetic position of Nqwebasaurus.

- Coelurosauria
  - Zuolong
  - - Tanycolagreus
    - Tyrannoraptora
      - Proceratosaurus
      - Tyrannosauroidea
      - - Ornitholestes
        - - Compsognathidae
          - Maniraptoriformes
            - Ornithomimosauria
              - Nqwebasaurus
              - - Pelecanimimus
                - - Shenzhousaurus
                  - - Harpymimus
                    - - Deinocheiridae
                        - Beishanlong
                        - - Garudimimus
                          - Deinocheirus
                      - Ornithomimidae
                        - Anserimimus
                        - - Gallimimus
                          - - Ornithomimus
                            - Struthiomimus
            - Maniraptora
              - Alvarezsauroidea
              - - Therizinosauroidea
                - - Oviraptorosauria
                  - Paraves

== See also ==
- Timeline of ornithomimosaur research
