= Rinchen Barsbold =

Mongolian paleontologist and geologist (1935–2025)

- Ринчений Барсболд
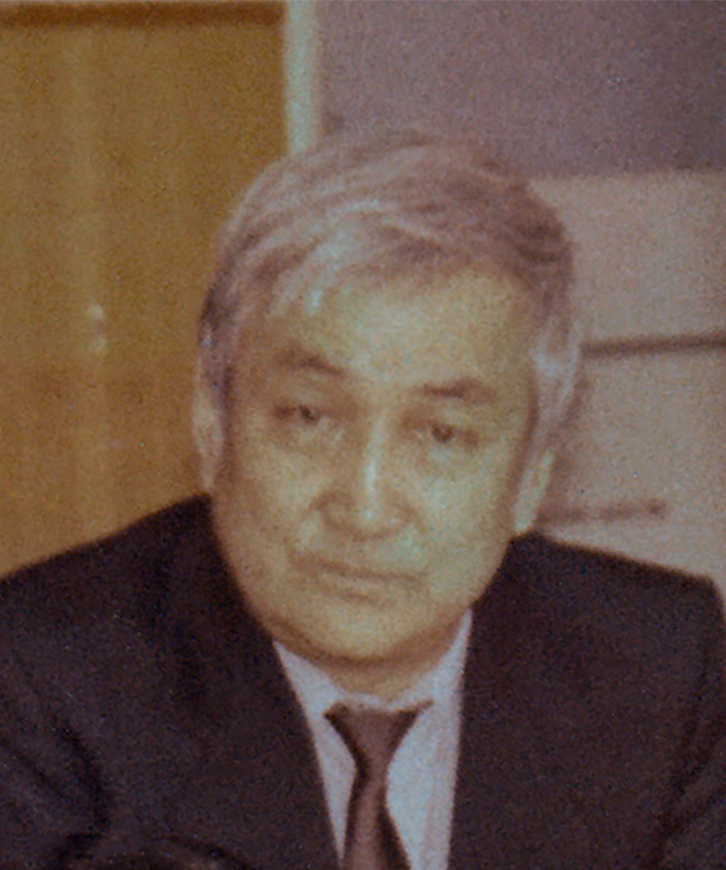
- Born: 21 December 1935
- Died: 28 August 2025 (aged 89)
- Citizenship: Mongolia
- Scientific career
- Fields: Paleontology, geology

Rinchen Barsbold (Mongolian: Ринченгийн Барсболд, Rinchyengiin Barsbold; 21 December 1935 – 28 August 2025) was a Mongolian paleontologist, geologist and an expert in vertebrate paleontology and Mesozoic stratigraphy. Most of his work was performed at the Institute of Geology in Ulaanbaatar. Barsbold was instrumental in the discovery and recovery of the Mongolian dinosaur fossil record. His work has helped to form a more complete understanding of the later stages of dinosaur evolution in Eurasia.

== Life and career ==
Barsbold had considerable influence on dinosaur paleontology in the communist Second World. His scientific work made him a leading authority on theropods of the Gobi Desert, starting with his doctoral dissertation on these dinosaurs. As early as 1983, he noted that in different lineages of theropods, many features previously only known from birds had evolved in various combinations (Barsbold 1983). He postulated that as a result of this "ornithization", one or several lineages of theropods that happened to acquire the proper combination of such traits went on to evolve into actual birds.

Since the identification of a number of feathered dinosaurs beginning in the late 1990s, Barsbold's ideas have been more fully appreciated. When he initially published his conclusions—a list of generally rather obscure anatomical features—in 1983, there was little exchange between the Mongolian scientific community and that of Western countries. Moreover, his early papers were usually published in Russian, in which few Western scientists were fluent. Therefore, Barsbold's theories initially had more impact among paleontologists in the Soviet Union and allied countries like Poland, Hungary and Romania.

Rinchen Barsbold was the son of scholar and writer Byambyn Rinchen. He died on 28 August 2025, at the age of 89.

== Dinosaur taxonomy ==
Barsboldia (Maryańska and Osmólska, 1981) is named after him.

The dinosaur genera and families named by Barsbold are, in alphabetical order:

- Adasaurus (1983)
- Anserimimus (1988)
- Conchoraptor (1986)
- the family Enigmosauridae (1983) (now synonymous with Therizinosauridae)
- Enigmosaurus (with A. Perle, 1983)
- Gallimimus (with H. Osmólska and E. Roniewicz, 1972)
- Garudimimus and the family Garudimimidae (1981)
- Harpymimus and the family Harpymimidae (with A. Perle, 1984)
- "Ingenia" (1981) (occupied, now Heyuannia yanshini)
- the subfamily Ingeniinae (1981) (now synonymous with Heyuanniinae)
- the family Oviraptoridae (1976)
- the suborder Segnosauria (with A. Perle, 1980) (now synonymous with Therizinosauria)

== Sources ==
- Barsbold, Rinchen (1983): O ptich'ikh chertakh v stroyenii khishchnykh dinozavrov. ["Avian" features in the morphology of predatory dinosaurs]. Transactions of the Joint Soviet Mongolian Paleontological Expedition 24: 96-103. [Original article in Russian.] Translated by W. Robert Welsh, copy provided by Kenneth Carpenter and converted by Matthew Carrano. PDF fulltext
