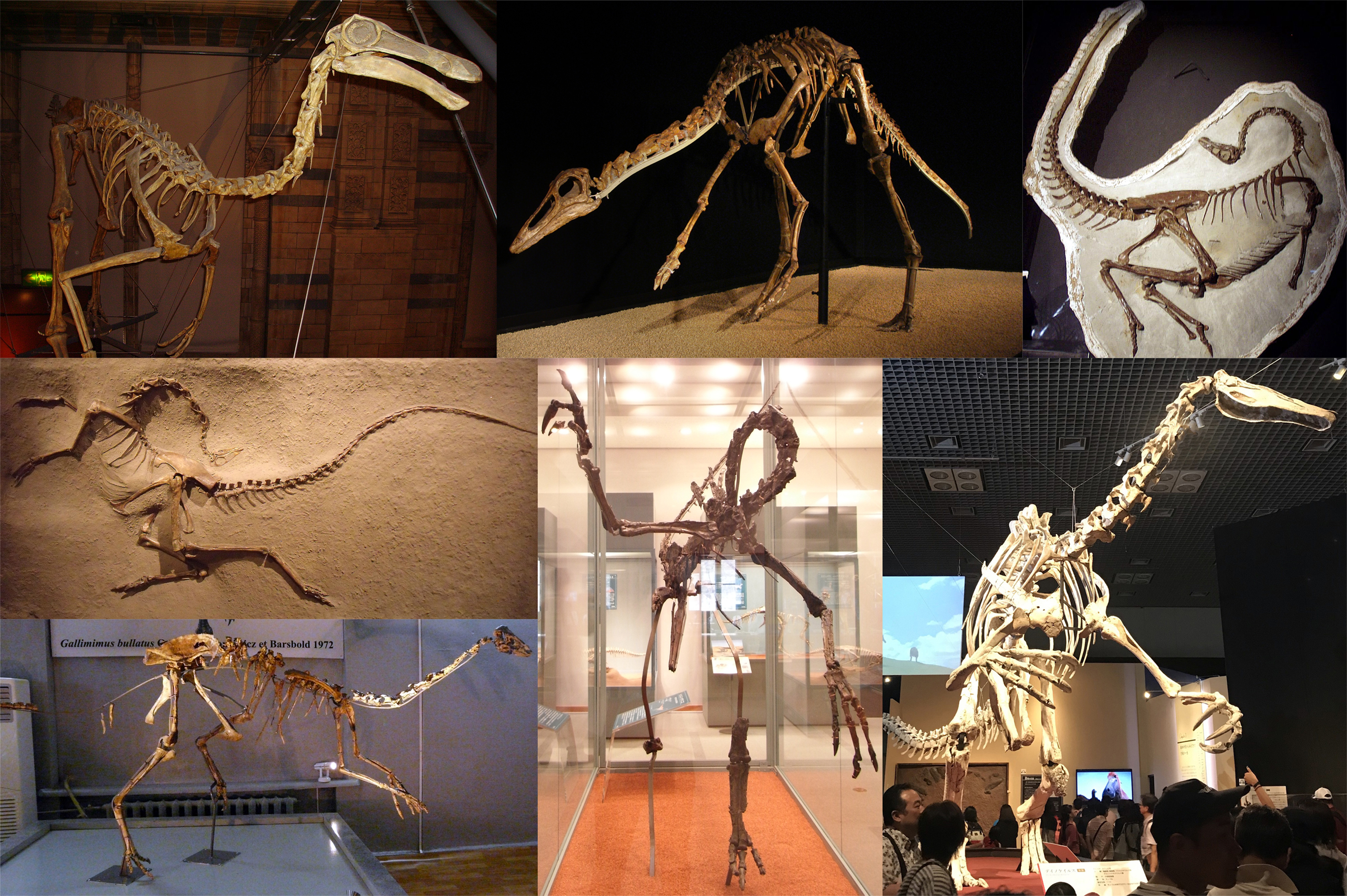
- Collection of seven ornithomimosaurs, clockwise from top left: Gallimimus, Anserimimus, Ornithomimus, Deinocheirus, Harpymimus, Struthiomimus and "Gallimimus mongoliensis"

Scientific classification
- Kingdom: Animalia
- Phylum: Chordata
- Class: Reptilia
- Clade: Dinosauria
- Clade: Saurischia
- Clade: Theropoda
- Clade: Maniraptoriformes
- Clade: †Ornithomimosauria; Barsbold, 1976

Subgroups
- †Aviatyrannis?; †Haplocheirus?; †Nedcolbertia; †Nqwebasaurus?; †Thecocoelurus?; †Valdoraptor?; †Macrocheiriformes Cuesta et al., 2021; †Harpymimus; †Pelecanimimus; †Shenzhousaurus; †Ornithomimoidea Marsh, 1890; †Arkansaurus; †Hexing; †Kinnareemimus; †Deinocheiridae; †Ornithomimidae

Synonyms
- Deinocheirosauria Barsbold, 1976; Arctometatarsalia Holtz, 1994

= Ornithomimosauria =

Ornithomimosaurs Temporal range: Cretaceous, 140–66 Ma

Extinct clade of theropod dinosaurs

Ornithomimosauria ("bird-mimic lizards") are theropod dinosaurs which bore a superficial resemblance to the modern-day ostrich. They were fast, omnivorous or herbivorous dinosaurs from the Cretaceous Period of Laurasia (now Asia, Europe and North America), as well as possibly Africa. The group first appeared in the Early Cretaceous and persisted until the Late Cretaceous. Primitive members of the group include Nqwebasaurus, Pelecanimimus, Shenzhousaurus, Hexing and Deinocheirus, the arms of which reached 2.4 m (8 feet) in length. More advanced species, members of the family Ornithomimidae, include Gallimimus, Struthiomimus, and Ornithomimus. Some paleontologists, like Paul Sereno, consider the enigmatic alvarezsaurids to be close relatives of the ornithomimosaurs and place them together in the superfamily Ornithomimoidea (see classification below).

== Description ==
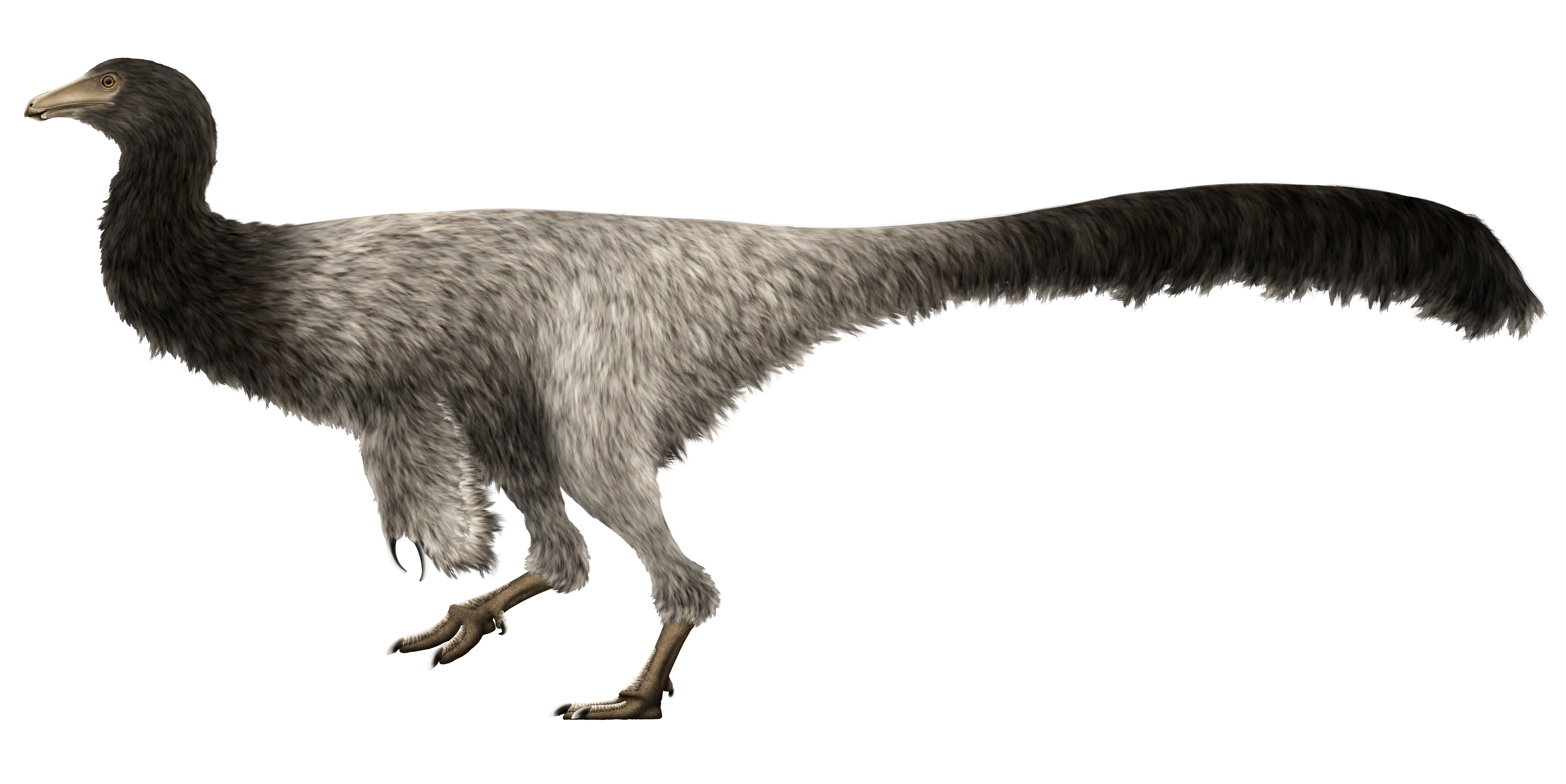
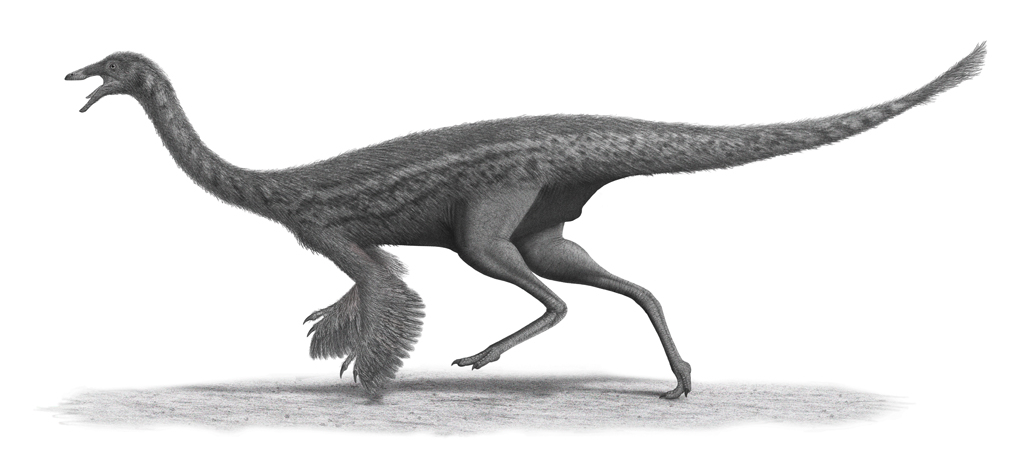
Life restorations of Garudimimus (top) and Gallimimus (bottom)

The skulls of ornithomimosaurs were small, with large eyes, above relatively long and slender necks. The most basal members of the taxon (such as Pelecanimimus and Harpymimus) had a jaw with small teeth, while the later and more derived species had a toothless beak. The fore limbs ("arms") were long and slender and bore powerful claws. The hind limbs were long and powerful, with a long foot and short, strong toes terminating in hooflike claws. Ornithomimosaurs were probably among the fastest of all dinosaurs. As in other coelurosaurs, the ornithomimosaurian hide was feathered rather than scaly.

=== Feathers ===
Unambiguous evidence of feathers is known from Ornithomimus edmontonicus, of which there are multiple specimens preserving feather traces. Deinocheirus and Pelecanimimus have been speculated to be feathered as well, the former due to the presence of a pygostyle, and the later due to possible impressions (otherwise taken to be collagen fibers). There is a debate on whether ornithomimids possessed the pennaceous feathers seen in Pennaraptora. Otherwise, a very ostrich-like plumage and feather range is known in one specimen of Ornithomimus.

== Classification ==
Named by O.C. Marsh in 1890, the family Ornithomimidae was originally classified as a group of "megalosaurs" (a "wastebasket taxon" containing any medium to large sized theropod dinosaurs), but as more theropod diversity was uncovered, their true relationships to other theropods started to resolve, and they were moved to the Coelurosauria. Recognizing the distinctiveness of ornithomimids compared to other dinosaurs, Rinchen Barsbold placed ornithomimids within their own infraorder, Ornithomimosauria, in 1976. The contents of Ornithomimidae and Ornithomimosauria varied from author to author as cladistic definitions began to appear for the groups in the 1990s.

In the early 1990s, prominent paleontologists such as Thomas R. Holtz Jr. proposed a close relationship between theropods with an arctometatarsalian foot; that is, bipedal dinosaurs in which the upper foot bones were 'pinched' together, an adaptation for running. Holtz (1994) defined the clade Arctometatarsalia as "the first theropod to develop the arctometatarsalian pes and all of its descendants." This group included the Troodontidae, Tyrannosauroidea, and Ornithomimosauria. Holtz (1996, 2000) later refined this definition to the branch-based "Ornithomimus and all theropods sharing a more recent common ancestor with Ornithomimus than with birds." Subsequently, the idea that all arctometatarsalian dinosaurs formed a natural group was abandoned by most paleontologists, including Holtz, as studies began to demonstrate that tyrannosaurids and troodontids were more closely related to other groups of coelurosaurs than they were to ornithomimosaurs. Since the strict definition of Arctometatarsalia was based on Ornithomimus, it became redundant with the name Ornithomimosauria under broad definitions of that clade, and the name Arctometatarsalia was mostly abandoned.

The paleontologist Paul Sereno, in 2005, proposed the clade "Ornithomimiformes", defining them as all species closer to Ornithomimus edmontonicus than to Passer domesticus. Because he had redefined Ornithomimosauria in a much narrower sense, a new term was made necessary within his preferred terminology to denote the clade containing the sistergroups Ornithomimosauria and Alvarezsauridae — previously the latter had been contained within the former. However, this concept only appeared on Sereno's Web site and has not yet been officially published as a valid name. "Ornithomimiformes" was identical in content to Holtz's Arctometatarsalia, as it has a very similar definition. While "Ornithomimiformes" is the newer group, Sereno rejected the idea that Arctometatarsalia should take precedence, because the meaning of the former name has been changed very radically by Holtz.

=== Phylogeny ===
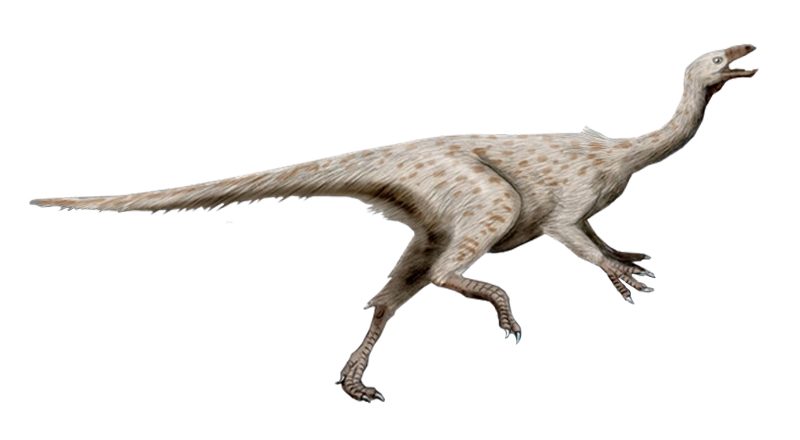
Restoration of Beishanlong grandis

Ornithomimosauria has variously been used for the branch-based group of all dinosaurs closer to Ornithomimus than to birds, and in more restrictive senses. The more exclusive sense began to grow in popularity when the possibility arose that alvarezsaurids might fall under Ornithomimosauria if an inclusive definition were adopted. Another clade, Ornithomimiformes, was defined by Sereno (2005) as (Ornithomimus velox > Passer domesticus) and replaces the more inclusive use of Ornithomimosauria when alvarezsaurids or some other group are found to be closer relatives of ornithomimosaurs than maniraptorans, with Ornithomimosauria redefined to include dinosaurs closer to Ornithomimus than to alvarezsaurids. Gregory S. Paul has proposed that Ornithomimosauria might be a group of primitive, flightless birds, more advanced than Deinonychosauria and Oviraptorosauria.

The cladogram below follows an analysis by Yuong-Nam Lee, Rinchen Barsbold, Philip J. Currie, Yoshitsugu Kobayashi, Hang-Jae Lee, Pascal Godefroit, François Escuillié & Tsogtbaatar Chinzorig. The analysis was published in 2014, and includes many ornithomimosaurian taxa.

- Coelurosauria
  - Zuolong
  - - Tanycolagreus
    - Tyrannoraptora
      - Proceratosaurus
      - Tyrannosauroidea
      - - Ornitholestes
        - - Compsognathidae
          - Maniraptoriformes
            - Ornithomimosauria
              - Nqwebasaurus
              - - Pelecanimimus
                - - Shenzhousaurus
                  - - Harpymimus
                    - - Deinocheiridae
                        - Beishanlong
                        - - Garudimimus
                          - Deinocheirus
                      - Ornithomimidae
                        - Anserimimus
                        - - Gallimimus
                          - - Ornithomimus
                            - Struthiomimus
            - Maniraptora
              - Alvarezsauroidea
              - - Therizinosauroidea
                - - Oviraptorosauria
                  - Paraves

The cladogram below follows the phylogenetic analysis by Scott Hartman and colleagues in 2019, which has included a vast majority of species and uncertain specimens, resulting in a novel phylogenetic arrangement.

- Ornithomimosauria
  - - Hexing
    - Deinocheirus
  - - Shenzhousaurus
    - - - Angeac taxon
        - Nedcolbertia
      - - Ornithomimidae
          - Aepyornithomimus
          - - Sinornithomimus
            - Ornithomimus
      - - Garudimimidae
          - Arkansaurus
          - - Archaeornithomimus
            - - GIN 960910KD
              - - Beishanlong
                - Garudimimus
      - - Harpymimus
        - - - Gallimimus "mongoliensis"
            - Tototlmimus
          - - - MNAP 11762A
              - - Rativates
                - Ornithomimus sedens
            - - - Anserimimus
                - - Qiupalong
                  - Dromiceiomimus
              - - Struthiomimus
                - - Timimus
                  - Gallimimus

Below is a cladogram by Serrano-Brañas et al., 2020, showing an analysis more in line with previous assumptions about ornithomimosaur classification.

- Ornithomimosauria
  - Nqwebasaurus
  - - Beishanlong
    - Pelecanimimus
    - Shenzhousaurus
    - - Deinocheiridae
        - Harpymimus
        - - Deinocheirus
          - Garudimimus
          - Paraxenisaurus
      - Ornithomimidae
        - Archaeornithomimus
        - - Dzharacursor
          - - Sinornithomimus
            - - Gallimimus
              - - Struthiomimus
                - - Qiupalong
                  - - Anserimimus
                    - Ornithomimus

== Palaeobiology ==
Ornithomimosaurs probably acquired most of their calories from plants. Many ornithomimosaurs, including primitive species, have been found with numerous gastroliths in their stomachs, characteristic of herbivores. Henry Fairfield Osborn suggested that the long, sloth-like "arms" of ornithomimosaurs may have been used to pull down branches on which to feed, an idea supported by further study of their strange, hook-like hands. The sheer abundance of ornithomimids — they are the most common small dinosaurs in North America — is consistent with the idea that they were plant eaters, as herbivores usually outnumber carnivores in an ecosystem. However, they may have been omnivores that ate both plants and small animal prey.

Comparisons between the scleral rings of two ornithomimosaur genera (Garudimimus and Ornithomimus) and modern birds and reptiles indicate that they may have been cathemeral, active throughout the day at short intervals.

=== Social behavior ===
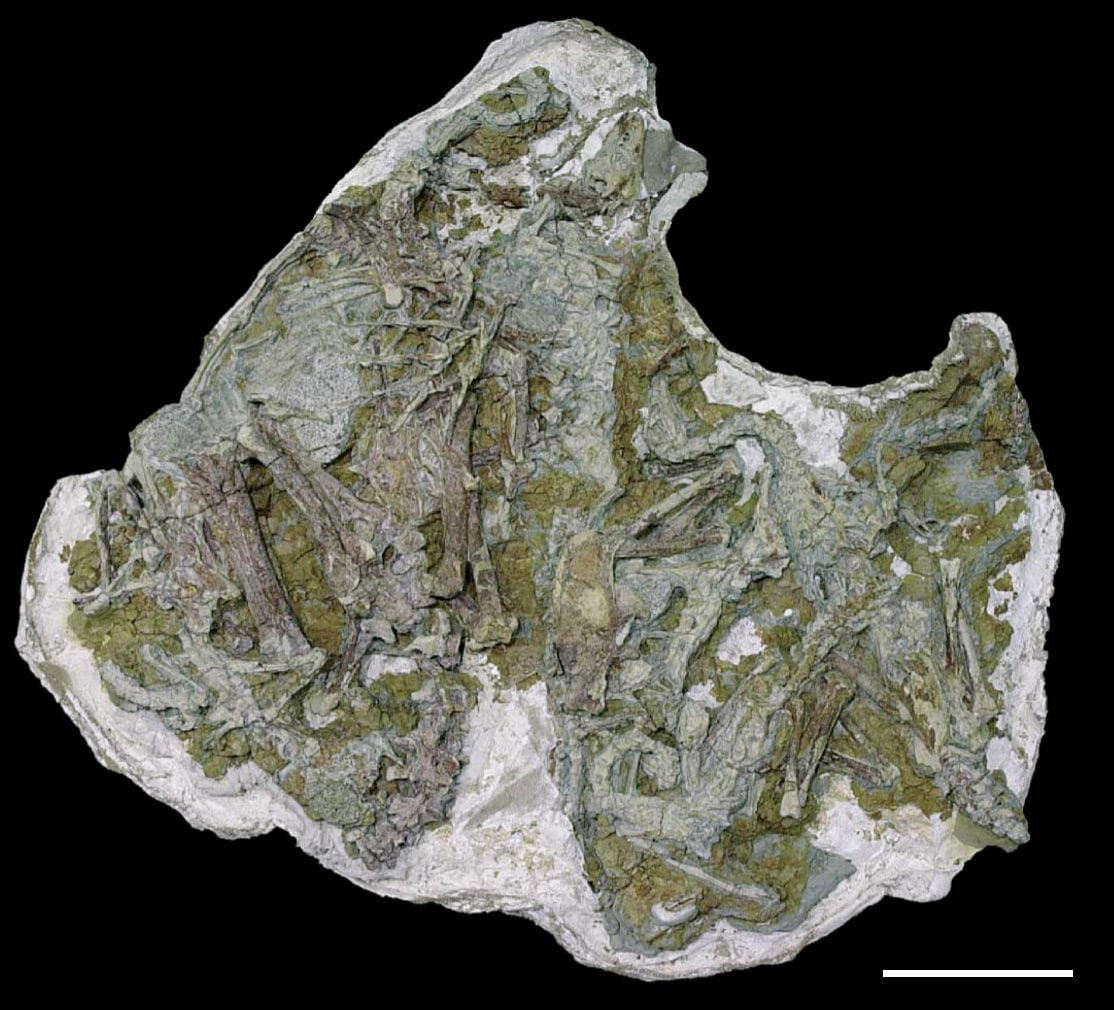
Block containing eight specimens of Sinornithomimus

Ornithomimosaurs are fairly well known for their gregarious life-styles. Some of the first findings of ornithomimosaur bonebeds were reported from the Iren Dabasu Formation in 1993 by Charles W. Gilmore. The bonebed consisted of numerous individuals of Archaeornithomimus ranging from young to adult remains. Multiple specimens of Sinornithomimus were collected from a single monospecific bonebed with a considerable density of juvenile individuals—out of 14, 11 were juveniles—, suggesting a gregarious behavior for an increased protection from predators. The notable abundance of juveniles indicates a high mortality in them or that a large mass-mortality event of an entire group occurred, with more susceptibility in juveniles. Additionally, the increase in the tibia-femur ratio through the ontogeny of Sinornithomimus may indicate higher cursorial capacities in adults than in juveniles. Moreover, and also contrary to the Sinornithomimus bonebed, a high concentration of ornithomimosaur specimens from the Bayshi Tsav locality was collected in a single multitaxic bonebed that is composed of at least five individuals at different ontogenetic stages. It is unlikely that the individuals of this bonebed represent a strategical social behaviour of a single species given the identification of at least two different taxa. Under this consideration, it is possible that a small pack of more than 10 individuals of different ornithomimosaurian herds was travelling together in optimal areas to find food resources, nesting sites or something else.

=== Palaeopathology ===
A right second metatarsal belonging to a large-bodied ornithomimosaur weighing approximately 432 kg has been described from Mississippi with a "butterfly" fragment fracture pattern characteristic of blunt force trauma, likely as a result of an interaction with a predator or a violent bout of intraspecific competition.

== See also ==
- Timeline of ornithomimosaur research
