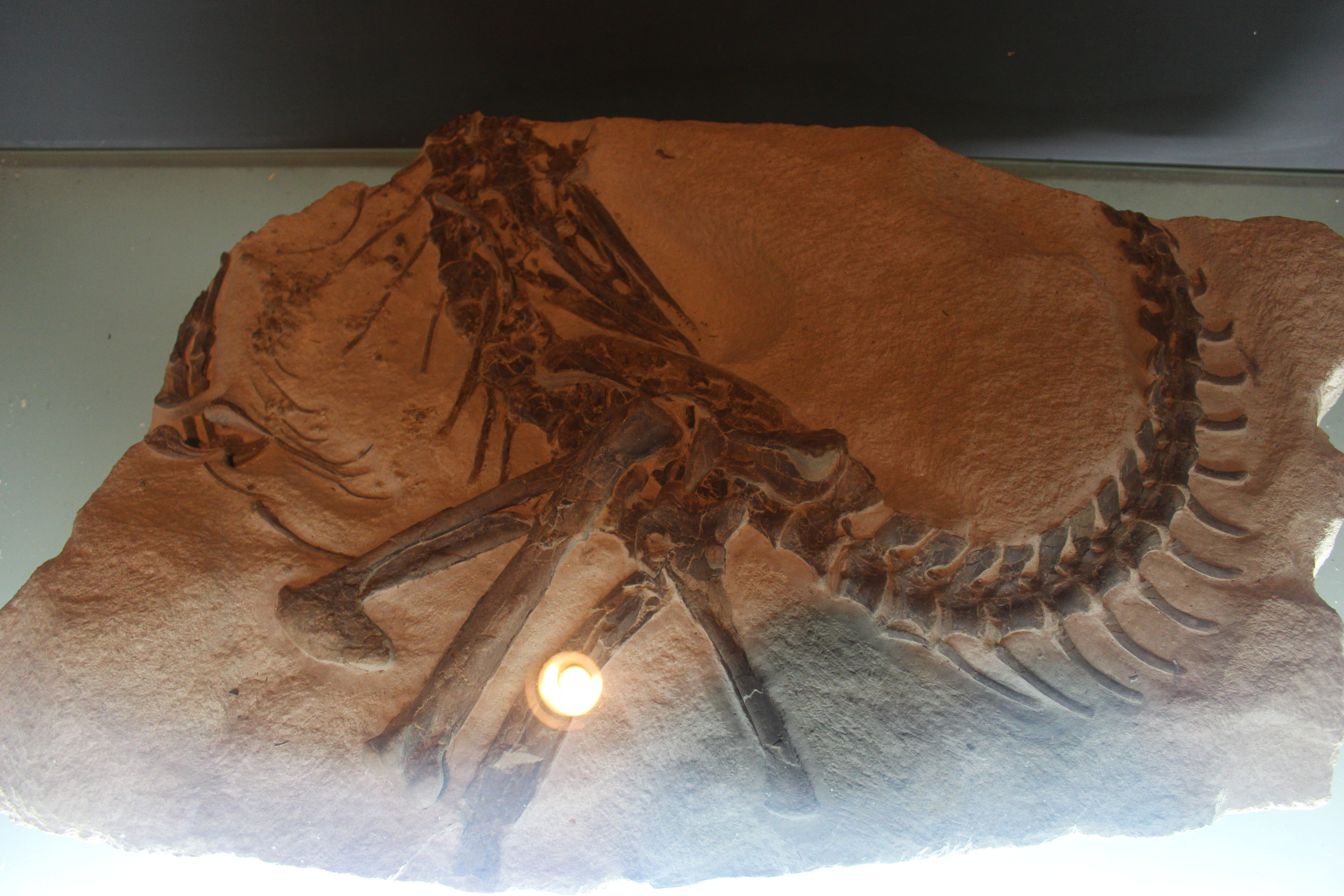
- Holotype, Geological Museum of China

Scientific classification
- Kingdom: Animalia
- Phylum: Chordata
- Class: Reptilia
- Clade: Dinosauria
- Clade: Saurischia
- Clade: Theropoda
- Clade: †Ornithomimosauria
- Clade: †Macrocheiriformes
- Genus: †Shenzhousaurus; Ji et al., 2003
- Species: †S. orientalis

Binomial name
- †Shenzhousaurus orientalis Ji et al., 2003

= Shenzhousaurus =

Shenzhousaurus Temporal range: Early Cretaceous, 126 Ma

Extinct genus of reptiles

Shenzhousaurus (meaning "Shenzhou lizard") is a genus of basal ornithomimosaurian theropod dinosaur from the Lower Cretaceous of China.

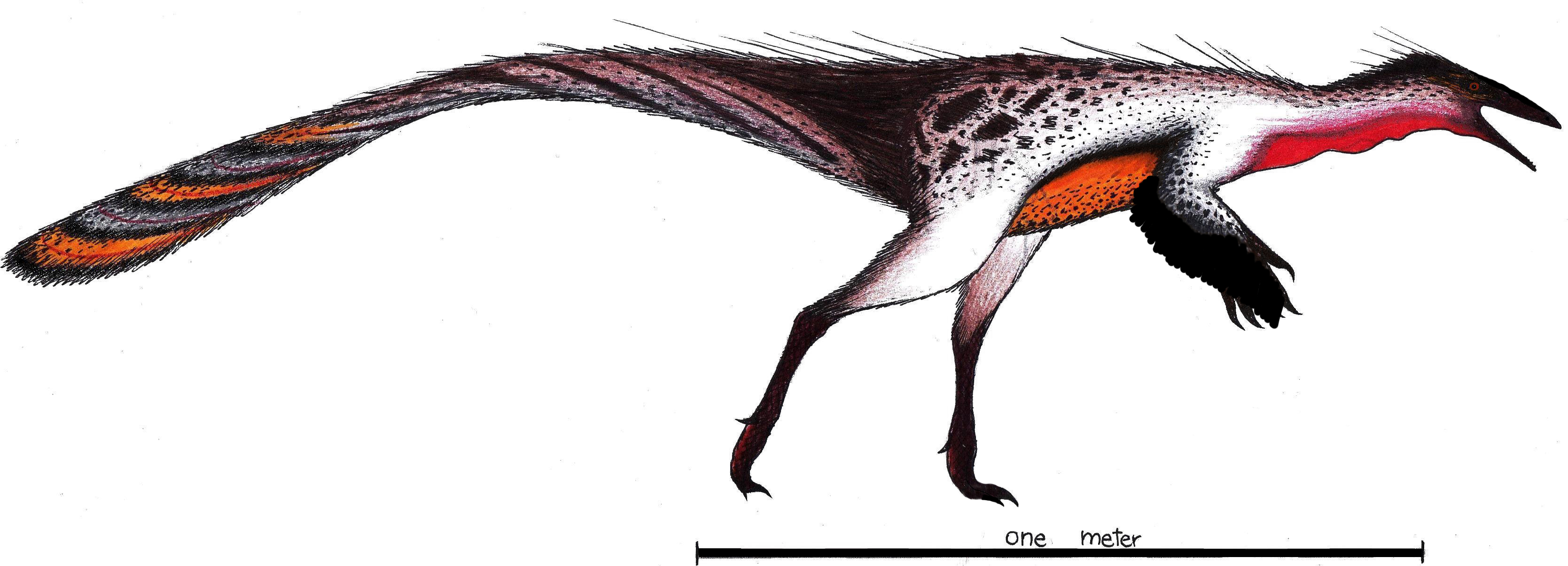
Restoration

The holotype (NGMC 97–4–002, National Geological Museum of China) was collected from near the bottom (fluvial beds) of the Yixian Formation (Aptian) at the Sihetun fossil site, Beipiao, western Liaoning Province. This specimen consists of a partial skeleton preserved on a sandstone slab in a "death pose," its head above the torso. The distal parts of the hindlimbs, distal portion of the tail, and the forelimbs (except for part of the right hand) and the pectoral girdle are missing. The head is crushed, exposing the left side obliquely.

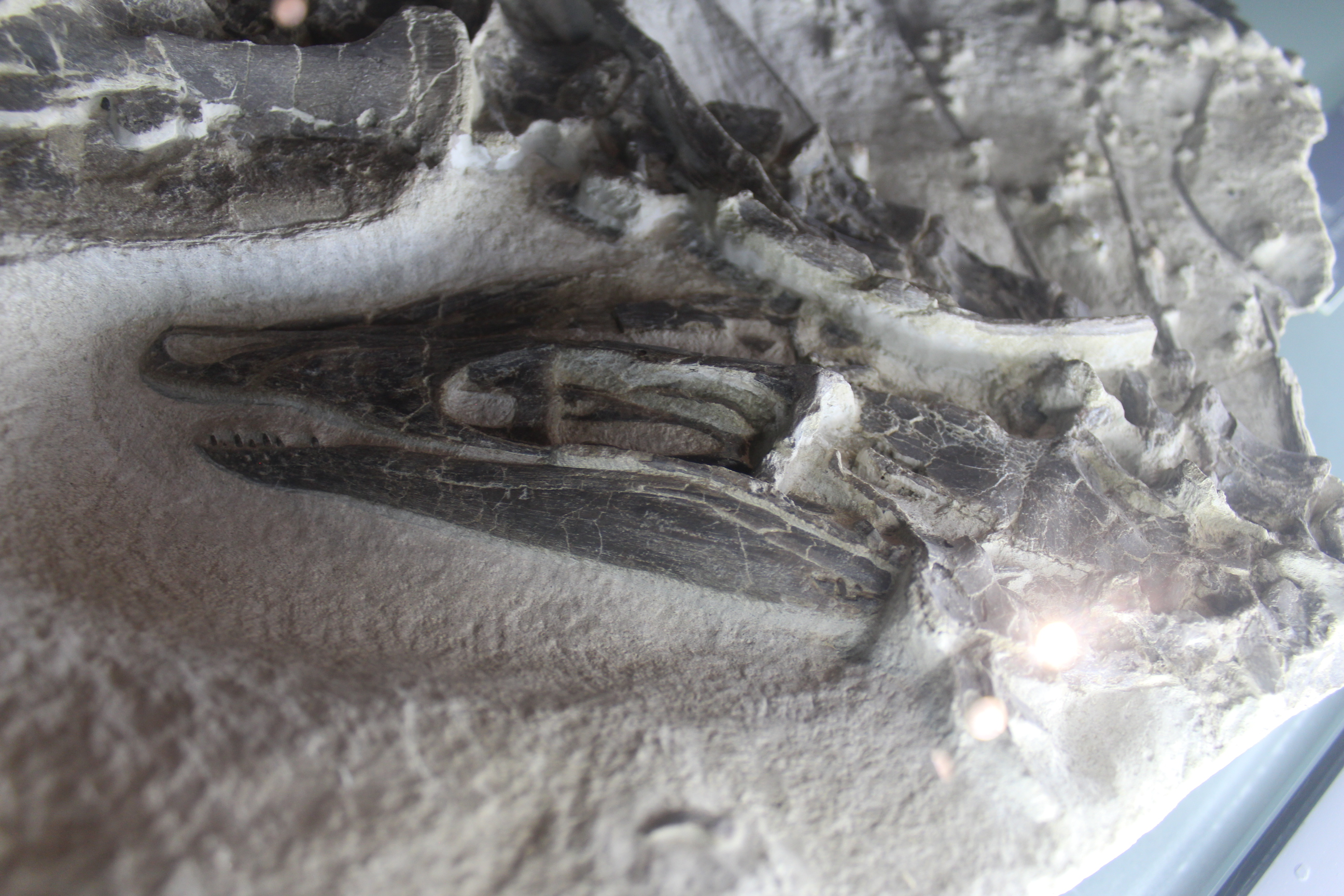
Skull of holotype, Geological Museum of China

Shenzhousaurus was first described by Qiang Ji, Mark Norell, Peter J. Makovicky, Keqin Gao, Shu-An Ji and Chongxi Yuan in 2003 and the type species is Shenzhousaurus orientalis. The genus is currently monotypic and appears to be more derived than Pelecanimimus polyodon, yet less derived than Harpymimus oklandikovi. It may be distinguished from the latter by its "straight ischial shaft and acuminateposterior end of the ilium" and from all other ornithomimosaurs excepting Harpymimus by the relative length of metacarpal I (only half that of metacarpal II) and in that its reduced dentition is restricted to the symphyseal portion of the dentary. The holotype skull measure 185 mm. A number of pebbles found in the thoracic cavity have been interpreted as gastroliths.

== See also ==
- Timeline of ornithomimosaur research
