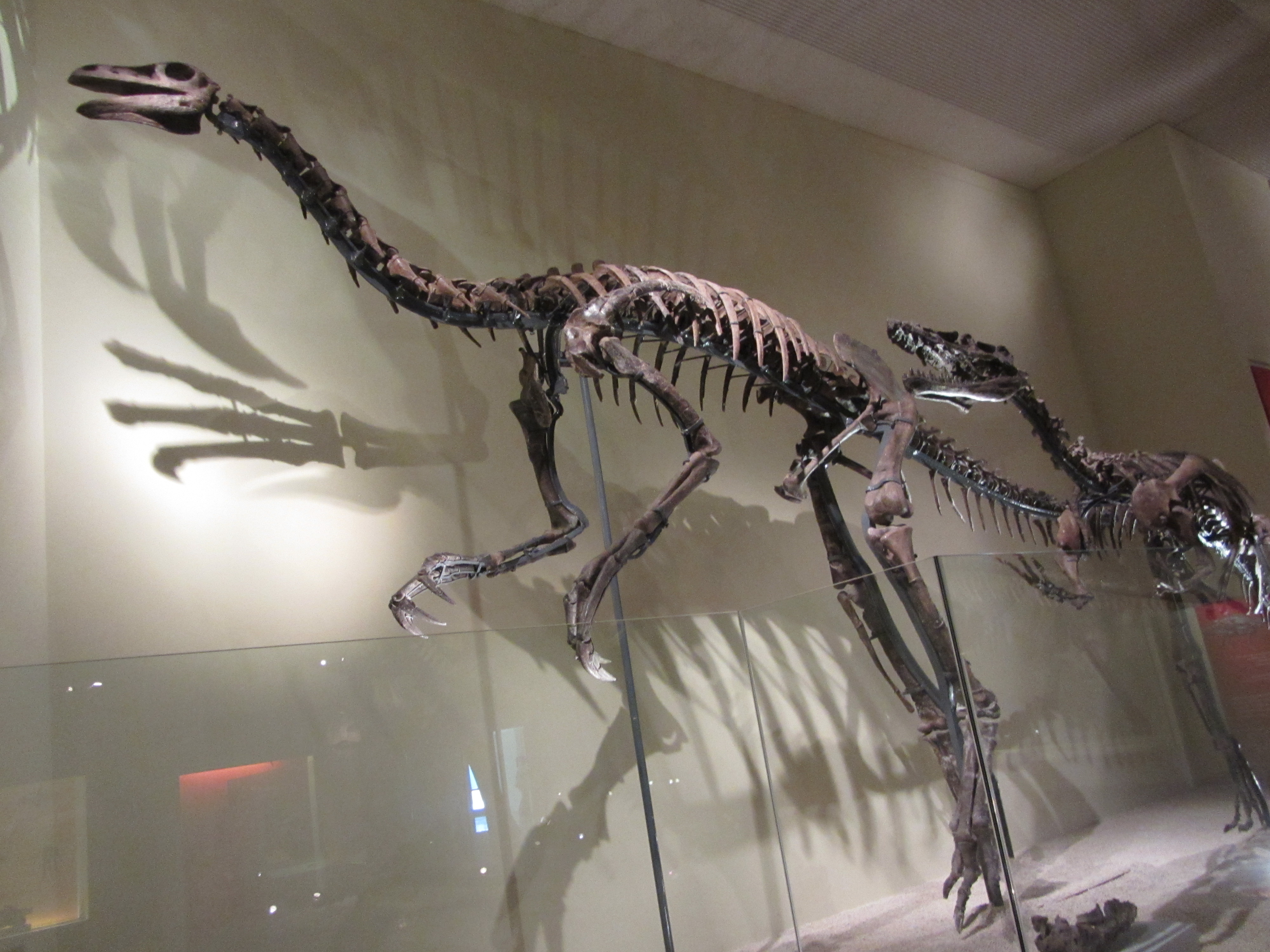
- Restored skeleton of Beishanlong and Xiongguanlong

Scientific classification
- Kingdom: Animalia
- Phylum: Chordata
- Class: Reptilia
- Clade: Dinosauria
- Clade: Saurischia
- Clade: Theropoda
- Clade: †Ornithomimosauria
- Family: †Deinocheiridae
- Genus: †Beishanlong; Makovicky et al., 2010
- Species: †B. grandis

Binomial name
- †Beishanlong grandis Makovicky et al., 2010

= Beishanlong =

Beishanlong Temporal range: Late Aptian, 123–113 Ma

Extinct genus of dinosaurs

Beishanlong is a genus of giant ornithomimosaurian theropod dinosaur from the Early Cretaceous of China. It is the second-largest ornithomimosaur discovered, only surpassed by the related Deinocheirus.

== Discovery and naming ==
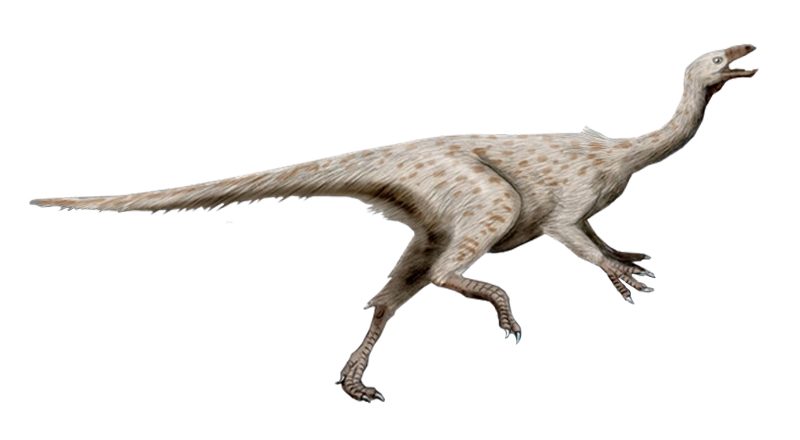
Life restoration

Three fossils of Beishanlong were found in the early twenty-first century in Northwestern China at the White Ghost Castle site, in the province of Gansu. The type species is Beishanlong grandis, described and named online in 2009 by a team of Chinese and American paleontologists, and formally published in January 2010 by the same Peter Makovicky, Li Daiqing, Gao Keqin, Matthew Lewin, Gregory Erickson and Mark Norrell. The generic name combines a reference to the Bei Shan, the "North Mountains", with a Chinese long, "dragon". The specific name means "large" in Latin, in reference to the body size.

Beishanlong lived in the late Aptian stage, with its fossils being uncovered in layers of the Xinminpu Group, in the Xiagou Formation. The holotype is FRDC-GS GJ (06) 01-18, found in 2006, consisting of a partial skeleton lacking the skull. The paratypes consist of two specimens found in 2007: one consisting of remains of hindlimbs, the other, FRDC-GS JB(07)01-01, being a pair of pubes. A fourth fossil found in 1999, IVPP V12756 consisting of foot bones, was tentatively referred to the species.

== Description ==
Size comparison

Beishanlong is of a considerable size, approximating the largest-known individuals of Gallimimus, which have been estimated to reach eight metres. According to the description, Beishanlong "is one of the largest definitive ornithomimosaurs yet described, though histological analysis shows that the holotype individual was still growing at its death." A histological study of the bone structure of the fibula found thirteen or fourteen growth lines, indicating the individual was subadult, though growth had already slowed. The size of this subadult individual is estimated at 5.9–7 m (19–23 ft) in length and 375–626 kilograms (827–1,380 lb) in body mass.

The build of Beishanlong was rather robust. The arms and legs were long, though lacking the extremely elongated hands, feet and claws of later forms.

== Classification ==
Beishanlong was by the describers assigned to the Ornithomimosauria, in a more basal position. Beishanlong was closely related to fellow ornithomimosaurian Harpymimus. Together they formed a polytomy with the main ornithomimosaurian branch just below Garudimimus. In 2014 Yuong-Nam Lee et al. recovered Beishanlong as a member of Deinocheiridae basal to a clade containing Garudimimus and Deinocheirus.

== See also ==
- Timeline of ornithomimosaur research
