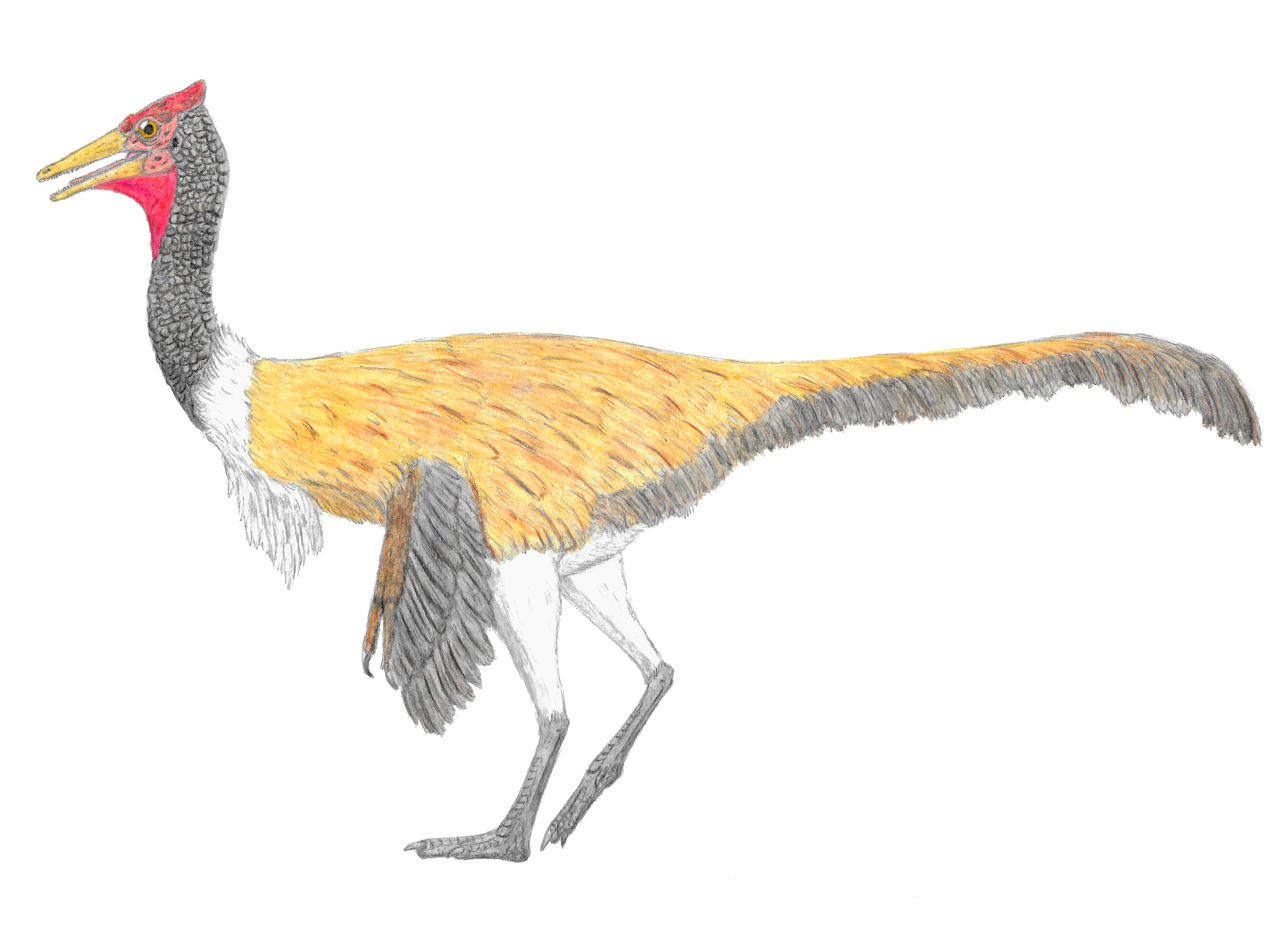
- Restoration of P. polyodon

Scientific classification
- Kingdom: Animalia
- Phylum: Chordata
- Class: Reptilia
- Clade: Dinosauria
- Clade: Saurischia
- Clade: Theropoda
- Clade: †Ornithomimosauria
- Clade: †Macrocheiriformes
- Genus: †Pelecanimimus; Perez-Moreno et al., 1994
- Species: †P. polyodon

Binomial name
- †Pelecanimimus polyodon Perez-Moreno et al., 1994

= Pelecanimimus =

Pelecanimimus Temporal range: Early Cretaceous, 125 Ma

Extinct genus of dinosaurs

Pelecanimimus (meaning "pelican mimic") is an extinct genus of basal ("primitive") ornithomimosaurian dinosaur from the Early Cretaceous of Spain. It is notable for possessing more teeth than any other member of the Ornithomimosauria (or any other theropod), most of which were toothless.

== Discovery and naming ==
In July 1993 Armando Díaz Romeral discovered a theropod skeleton at the Las Hoyas Unit 3 site. In 1994 this was named and described by Bernardino Pérez Pérez-Moreno, José Luis Sanz, Angela Buscalioni, José Moratalla, Francisco Ortega and Diego Rasskin-Gutman as a new species: Pelecanimimus polyodon. The generic name is derived from Latin pelecanus, "pelican", and mimus, "mimic", in reference to the long snout and throat pouch. The specific name is a reference to the large number of teeth possessed by this theropod and is derived from Greek πολύς (polys), "many" and ὀδούς (odous) "tooth".

The holotype specimen, LH 7777, part of the Las Hoyas Collection presently housed at the Museo de Cuenca, Cuenca, Spain, of Pelecanimimus was recovered at the La Hoyas locality in Cuenca Province, Spain, from lagerstätte beds within the Calizas de La Huérguina Formation dating to the Lower Barremian. The only known specimen consists of the articulated front half of a skeleton and includes the skull, lower jaws, all the neck vertebrae and most of the back vertebrae, ribs, sternum, the pectoral girdle, a complete right forelimb and most of the left forelimb. Remains of the soft parts are visible at the back of the skull, around the neck and around the front limbs.

== Description ==
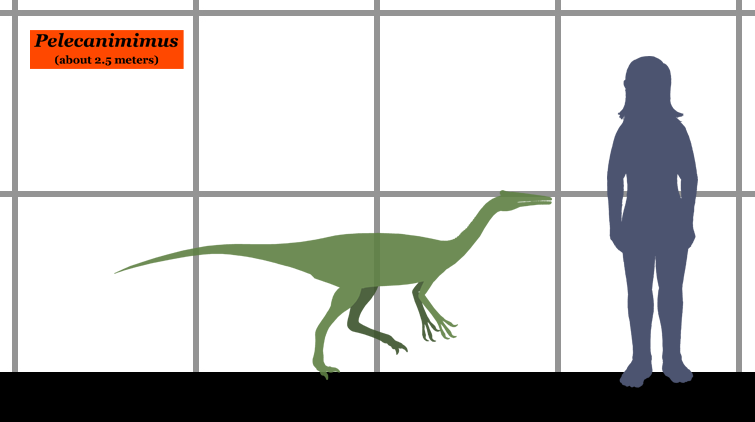
Estimated size of Pelecanimimus, compared to a human.

Pelecanimimus was a small ornithomimosaur, at about 1.9–2.5 m (6.2–8.2 ft) and 17–30 kg (37–66 lb). Its skull was unusually long and narrow, with a maximum length of about 4.5 times its maximum height. It was highly unusual among ornithomimosaurs in its large number of teeth: it had about 220 very small teeth in total, with seven premaxillary teeth, about thirty maxillary, and seventy-five in the dentary. The teeth were heterodont, showing two different basic forms. The teeth in the front of the upper jaw were broad and D-shaped in cross-section, while those further back were blade-like, and on the whole the teeth in the upper jaw were larger than those in the lower. All of its teeth were unserrated, and had a constricted "waist" between the crown and the root. Interdental plates were lacking.

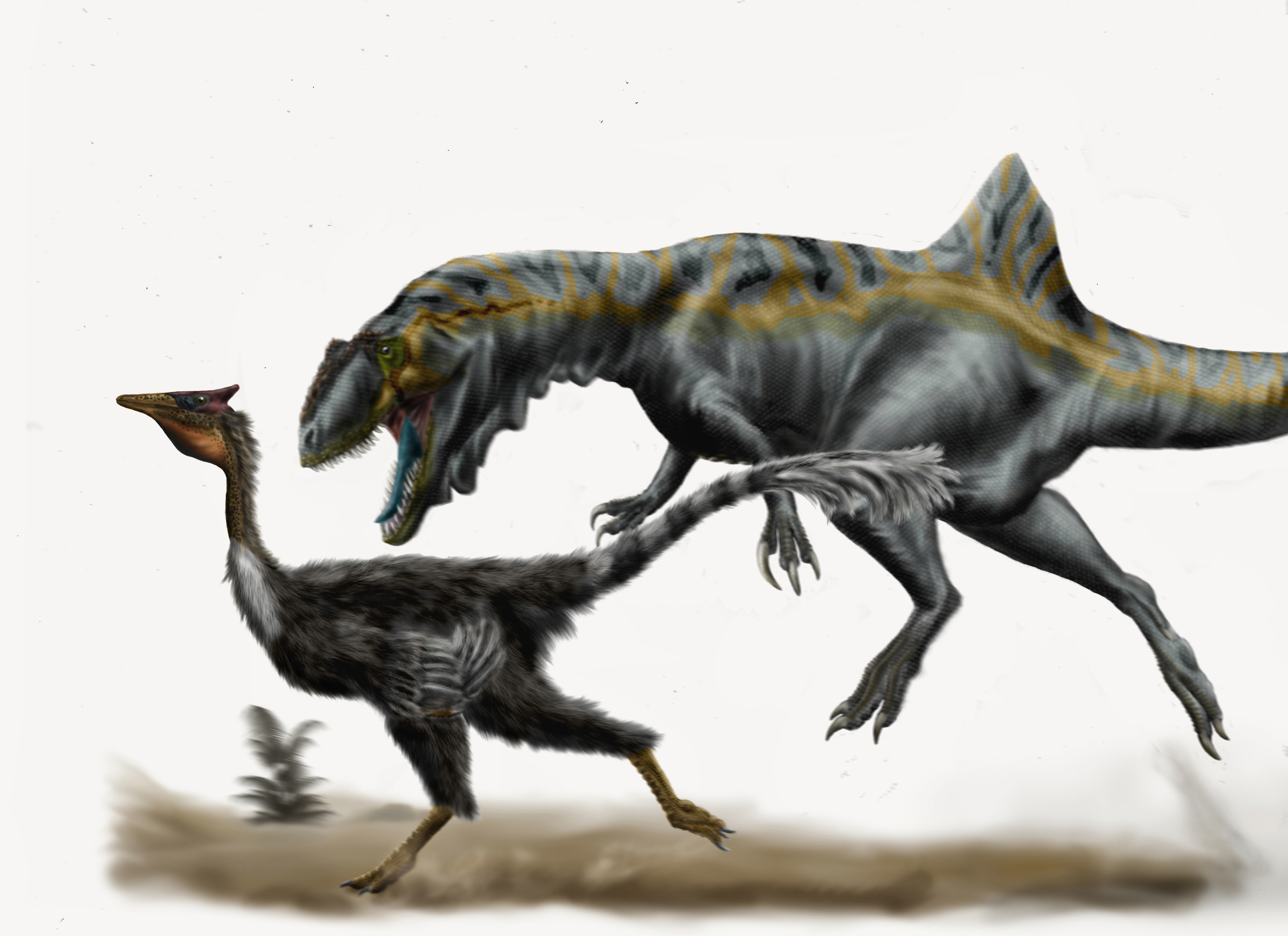
Pelecanimimus being chased by Concavenator

Only one other ornithomimosaur is known to possess teeth, Harpymimus, which had far fewer (eleven total, and only in the lower jaw). The presence of such a large number of teeth in Pelecanimimus, coupled with a lack of interdental space, was interpreted by Pérez-Moreno et al. as an adaptation for cutting and ripping, a "functional counterpart of the cutting edge of a beak," as well as an exaptation leading to the toothless cutting edge found in later ornithomimosaurs. The arms and hands of Pelecanimimus were more typical of ornithomimosaurs, with the ulna and radius bones in the lower arm tightly adhered to each other. The hand was hook-like and had fingers of equal length equipped with rather straight claws.

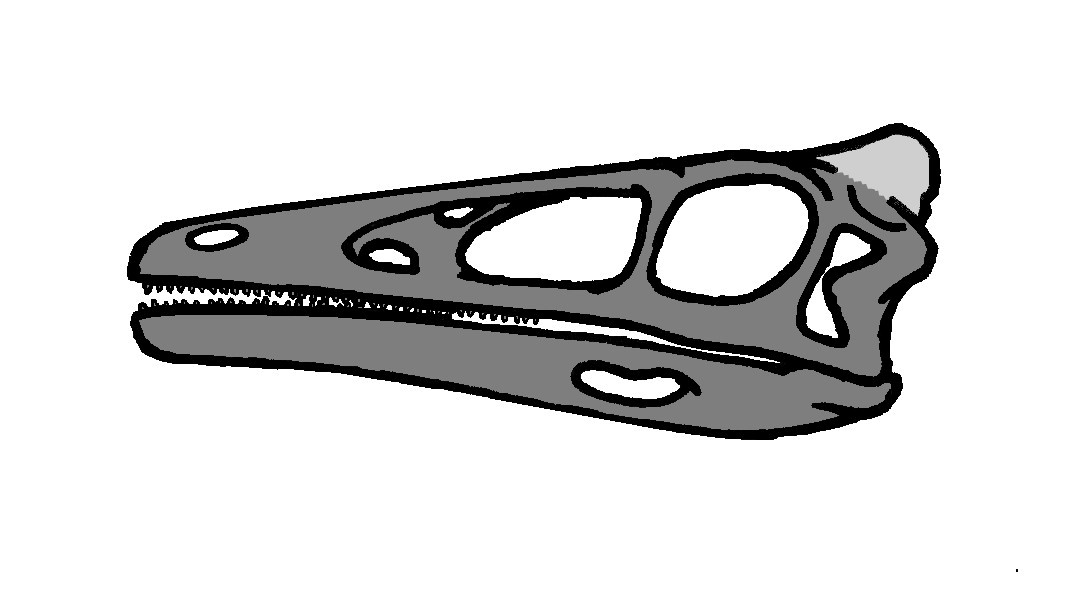
Illustration of the skull from Pelecanimimus. The small crest in back of the head (colored in light grey) was probably made by keratin.

Soft-tissue remains preserved by the exceptional preservational environment of the La Hoyas lagerstätte revealed the presence of a small skin or keratin crest on the back of the head, and a gular pouch similar to the much larger pouches found in modern pelicans, from which Pelecanimimus took its name. Pelecanimimus might have been much like a modern-day crane, wading out in lakes or ponds using its claws and teeth to capture fish and then storing them in its skin flap. Some parts of the impressions revealed wrinkled skin, interpreted as lacking scales or feathers. Filament-like structures were also preserved; first interpreted as an integument, some of these were later seen as representing preserved muscle fibers. Pelecanimimus was also the first ornithomimosaur discovered with a preserved hyoid apparatus (specialized tongue bones in the neck). Gregory S. Paul has speculated that Pelecanimimus might have been capable of flight or be a recent descendant from a flying animal. This is due to the presence of large sternal plates and uncinate processes, which imply flight musculature. These adaptations have been noted years later by the paleontologist Mickey Mortimer.

== Classification ==
Pelecanimimus was by the describers assigned to the Ornithomimosauria, in the basalmost position. A later cladistic analysis by Makovicky et al. (2005) confirmed that Pelecanimimus is the most basal member of the Ornithomimosauria, less derived even than Harpymimus. A study by Kobayashi and Lü in 2003 indicated that these two species formed a basal arrangement of steps leading towards the more advanced ornithomimids (see cladogram below). The discovery of Pelecanimimus has played an important and surprising role in understanding the evolution of the Ornithomimosauria. To quote Pérez-Moreno et al., "The phylogenetic hypothesis...supports an unexpected approach, involving exaptation, which might explain the evolutionary process towards the toothless condition in Ornithomimosauria. Until now, a progressive reduction in the number of teeth has been considered as the most likely explanation: the primitive tetanuran theropods have up to 80 teeth with tall blade-like crowns, and the primitive ornithomimosaurs have only a few small teeth. The phylogenetic hypothesis suggests an alternative evolutionary process based on a functional analysis of increasing numbers of teeth. A high number of teeth with enough interdental space and properly placed denticles (as in troodontids) would be an adaptation for cutting and ripping. On the other hand, an excessive number of teeth with no interdental space (as in Pelecanimimus) would be a functional counterpart of the cutting edge of a beak. Thus, increasing the number of teeth would be an adaptation for cutting and ripping, as long as the space between adjacent teeth was preserved...while it would have the effect of working as a beak if spaces were filled with more teeth. The adaption to a cut-and-rip function therefore becomes an exaptation with a slicing effect, eventually leading to the cutting edge seen in most ornithomimosaurs."

Cladogram after Kobayashi and Lü, 2003:

- Ornithomimosauria
  - Pelecanimimus
  - - Harpymimus
    - - Garudimimus
      - - Ornithomimidae

== Paleoecology ==
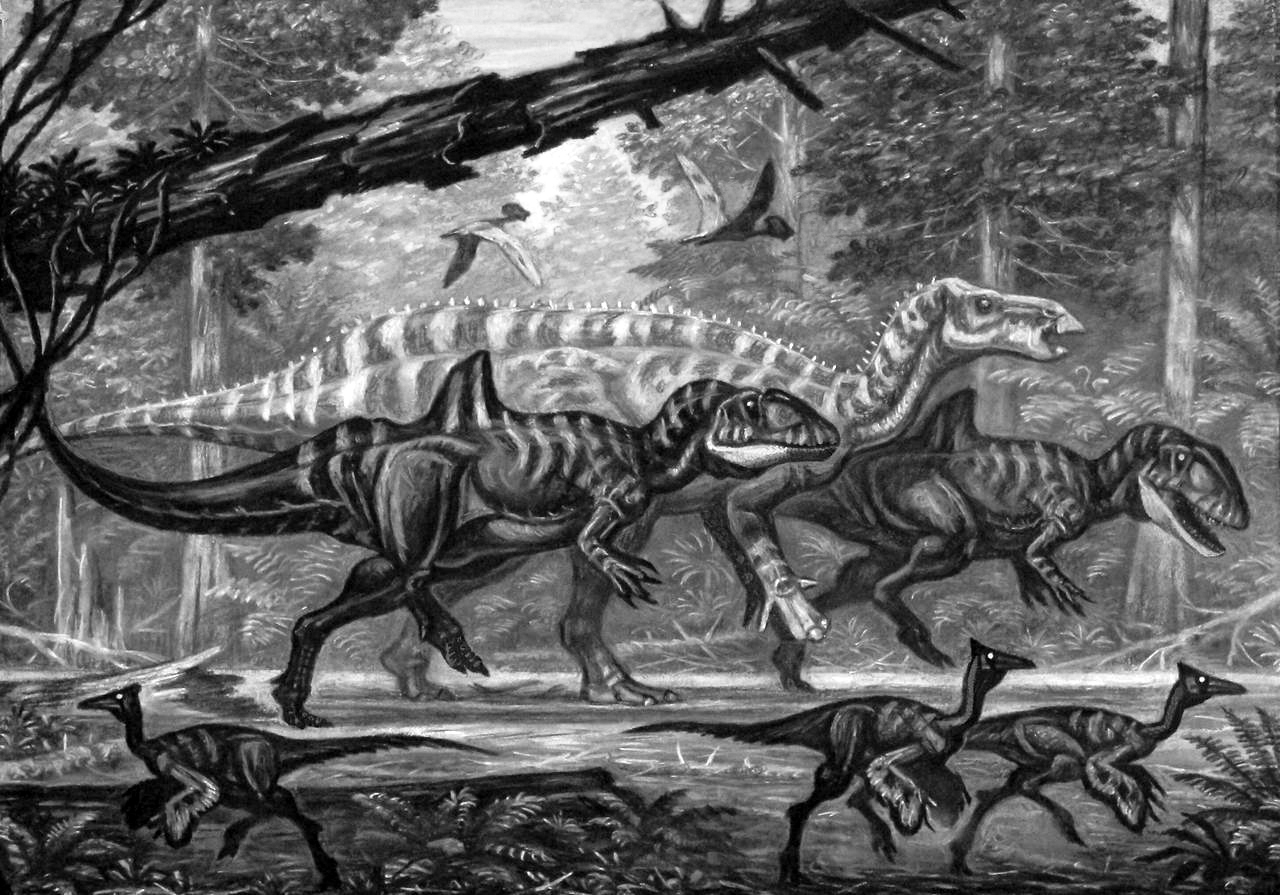
Pelecanimimus (foreground) among contemporary animals

The Las Hoyas lagerstätte has produced numerous other exquisitely preserved species, including the enantiornithine birds Iberomesornis, Concornis, and Eoalulavis, along with non-avian theropod teeth, Concavenator remains, and a few fragmentary sauropod bones. Coarse sediments of the La Hoyas lagerstätte have produced bones of the ornithopod dinosaur Iguanodon. The lagerstätte beds have also yielded remains of lizards and salamanders, as well as of the unique early mammal Spinolestes. Several pterosaurs like Europejara and crocodylomorphs are also known.

== See also ==
- Timeline of ornithomimosaur research
