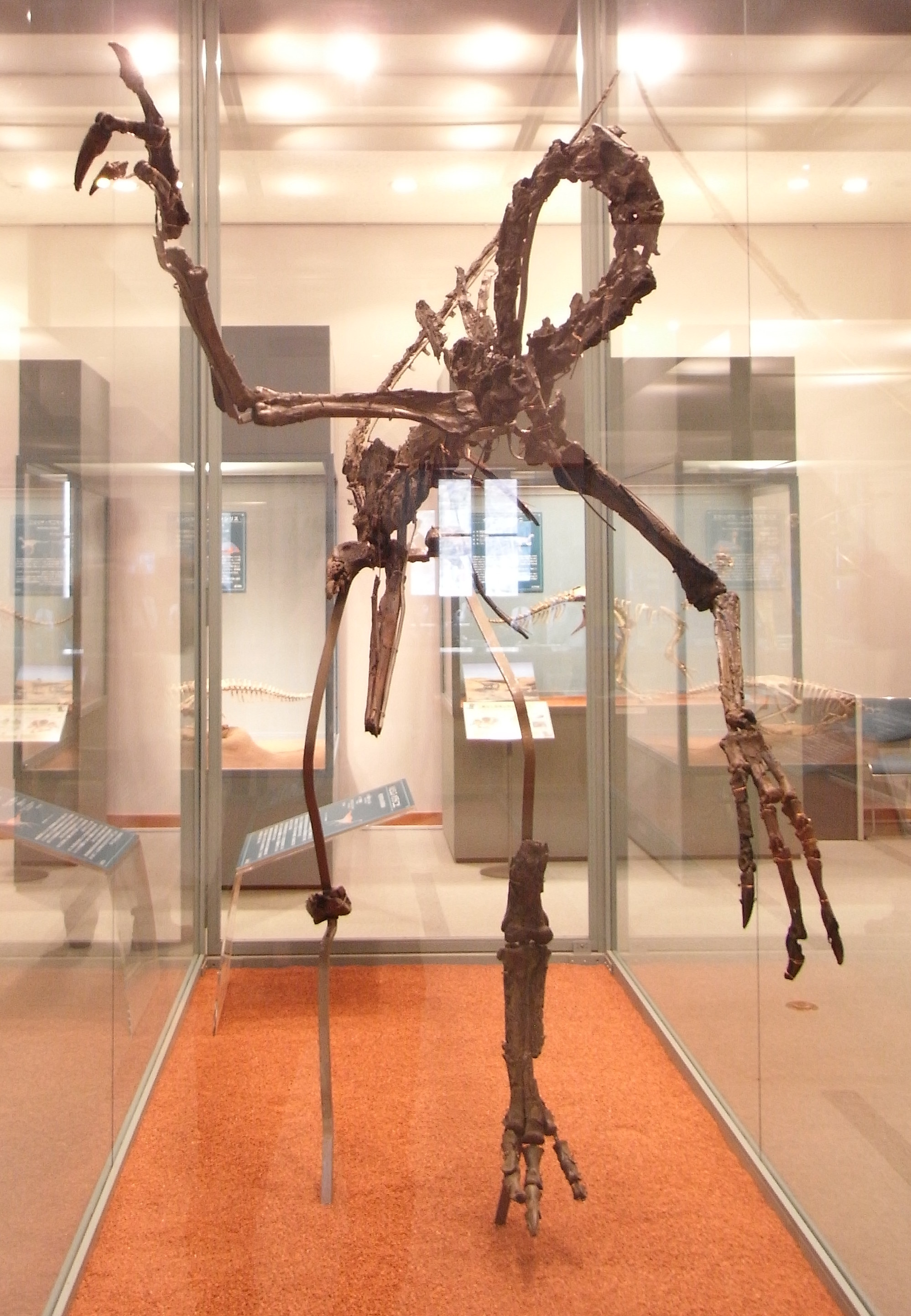
- Holotype specimen

Scientific classification
- Kingdom: Animalia
- Phylum: Chordata
- Class: Reptilia
- Clade: Dinosauria
- Clade: Saurischia
- Clade: Theropoda
- Clade: †Ornithomimosauria
- Family: †Harpymimidae; Barsbold & Perle, 1984
- Genus: †Harpymimus; Barsbold & Perle, 1984
- Species: †H. okladnikovi

Binomial name
- †Harpymimus okladnikovi Barsbold & Perle, 1984

= Harpymimus =

Harpymimus Temporal range: Mid-Late Albian 107–100 Ma

Extinct genus of dinosaurs

Harpymimus is a genus of basal ornithomimosaurian theropod dinosaur from the Early Cretaceous Period of what is now Mongolia. Unlike later, more derived ornithomimosaurs, Harpymimus still possessed teeth, although they appear to have been restricted to the dentary of the lower jaw.

== Discovery and naming ==
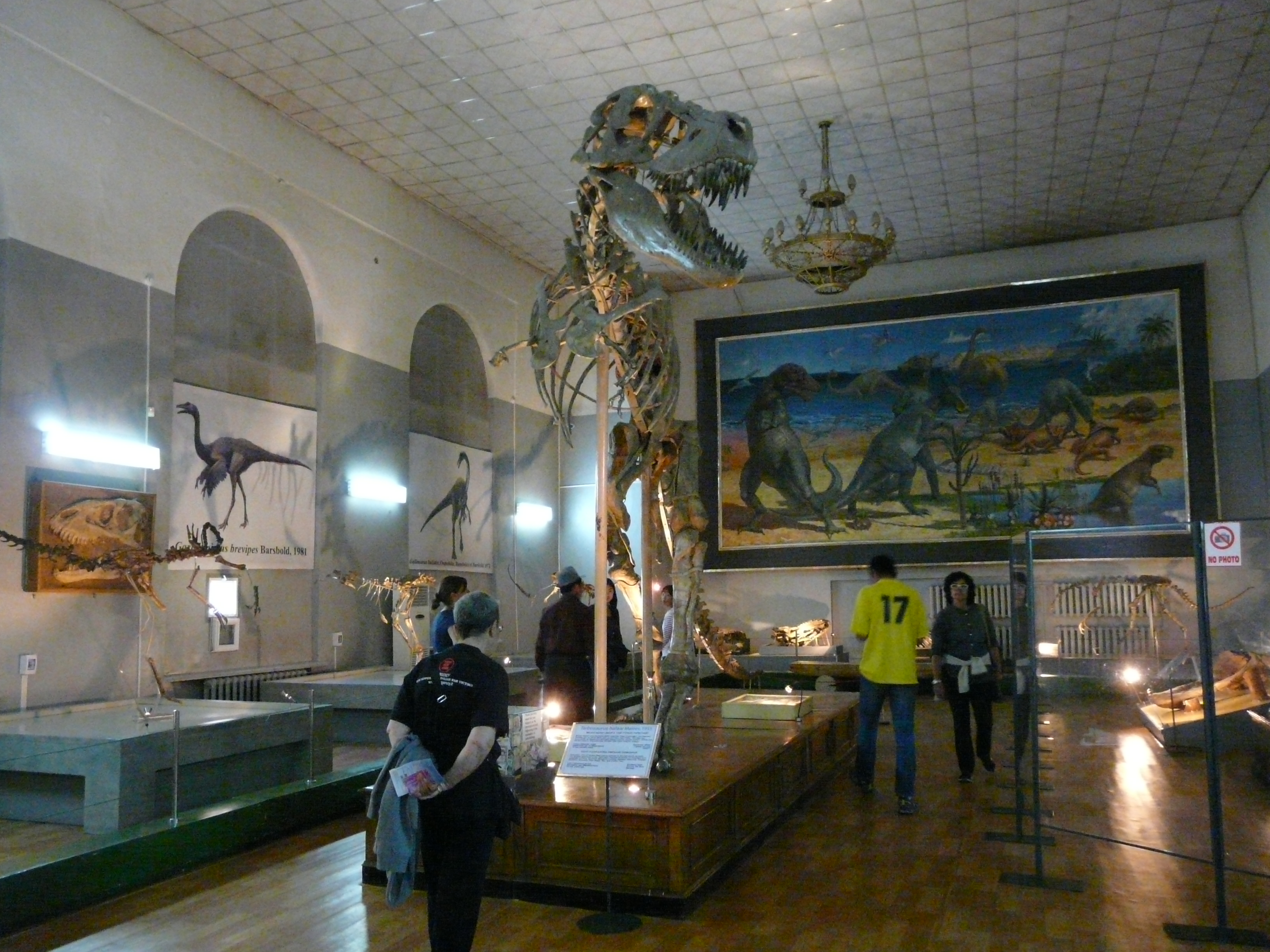
Holotype (lower left) in Mongolia

In 1981, a Soviet-Mongolian expedition uncovered a theropod skeleton in the Gobi Desert. In 1984 this was named and shortly described by Rinchen Barsbold and Altangerel Perle as the type and only species of the new genus Harpymimus: Harpymimus okladnikovi. The generic name Harpymimus is a reference to the fearsome Harpy of Greek mythology and derived from Greek ἅρπυια (harpyia), "Harpy", and μῖμος (mimos), "mimic". The specific name honours the late Soviet archeologist Alexey Pavlovich Okladnikov.

The holotype specimen IGM 100/29 (Mongolian Academy of Sciences, Ulaanbaatar, Mongolia) consists of an almost complete and articulated but compressed skeleton, lacking only portions of the pectoral girdle, pelvic girdle, and hindlimbs. It was recovered in the Dundgovi Aimag (Eastern Gobi Province), from an exposure of the Shinekhudag Formation now part of the Khuren Dukh Formation which dates to the Mid-Late Albian Other dinosaurs collected from the Shinekhudug Formation in Dundgovi include the ceratopsian Psittacosaurus mongoliensis.

== Description ==
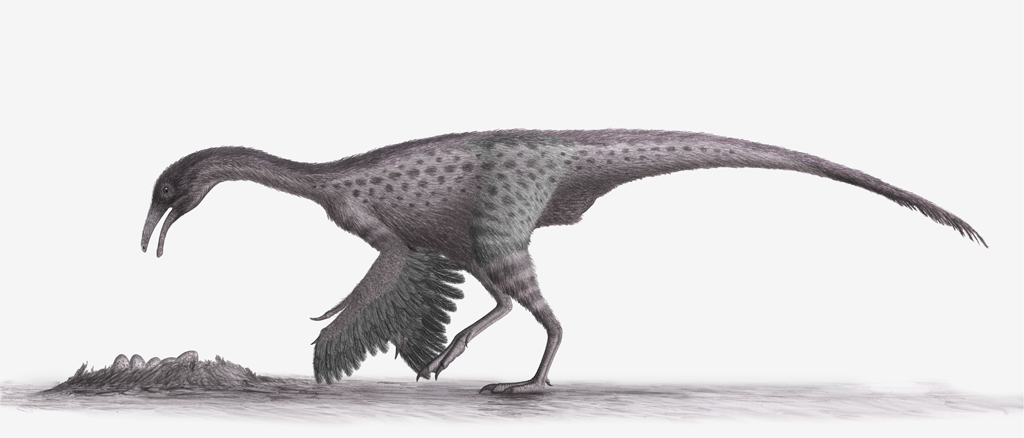
Restoration of H. okladnikovi by a nest

Harpymimus was extensively described for the first time in a dissertation by Yoshitsugu Kobayashi in 2004. In a 2005 article, Kobayashi and Barsbold diagnosed Harpymimus based on a number of anatomical characteristics, including eleven teeth in the front of the lower jaw (dentary), the transition between anterior and posterior tail vertebrae taking place at the eighteenth caudal, a triangular-shaped depression above the dorsal surface of a ridge on the shoulder blade (scapula) above the shoulder joint, a low ridge above a distinctive depression along back edge of the shoulder blade, and a small but deep collateral ligament fossa on the lateral condyle of metacarpal III (a hand bone).

The skull of the type specimen of Harpymimus is virtually complete, but badly crushed, obscuring some anatomical detail. There is evidence of a beak covering the upper jaw which, in concert with the dentary teeth, was likely employed for grasping and holding food. Its general appearance was much like that of later ornithomimosaurs (long-necked, long arms with sharp grasping claws, and long legs). The teeth of Harpymimus differ from those of another basal ornithomimosaur, Pelecanimimus polyodon, in that they are restricted to the dentary, are cylindrical and separated by interdental plates, and number at least ten and perhaps eleven per side. Pelecanimimus possessed per side seventy-five dentary teeth in the lower jaw, as well as an additional thirty-seven teeth in the upper jaw (maxilla and premaxilla). The small teeth of Harpymimus were probably used only for grabbing and holding food items, unlike those of many other theropods, which were adapted to cutting or piercing prey. Of all the known ornithomimosaurs, only Harpymimus and Pelecanimimus retained teeth, a trait which is primitive (plesiomorphic) for the clade Ornithomimosauria. Other basal traits are the very short first metacarpal in the hand and a third metatarsal that, though pinched at the top, is at that point not excluded form the front surface of the metatarsus, so that the foot is not arctometatarsalian.

The length of the skull is approximately 262 mm, more than twice its approximate height and less than half the length of the neck (approximately 600 mm). It is estimated to have weighed over 146.5 kilograms (323 lb).

== Classification ==
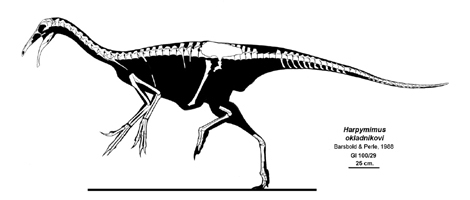
Skeletal diagram

Harpymimus was originally assigned to the Harpymimidae. In their 2005 paper, Kobayashi and Barsbold also conducted a detailed cladistic analysis of Harpymimus and determined that Harpymimus is basal to the clade of Garudimimus brevipes plus Ornithomimidae, yet is more derived than Pelecanimimus polyodon. According to these researchers, the conclusions of the analysis supported the model that ornithomimosaurs originated in either eastern Asia or in Europe prior to the Barremian stage of the Early Cretaceous (130-125 million years ago), then migrated to North America during or at some time before the Late Cretaceous.

In the description of Paraxenisaurus from Serrano-Brañas et al. (2020), their phylogenetic analysis recovered Harpymimus to be a basal deinocheirid.

== See also ==
- Timeline of ornithomimosaur research
