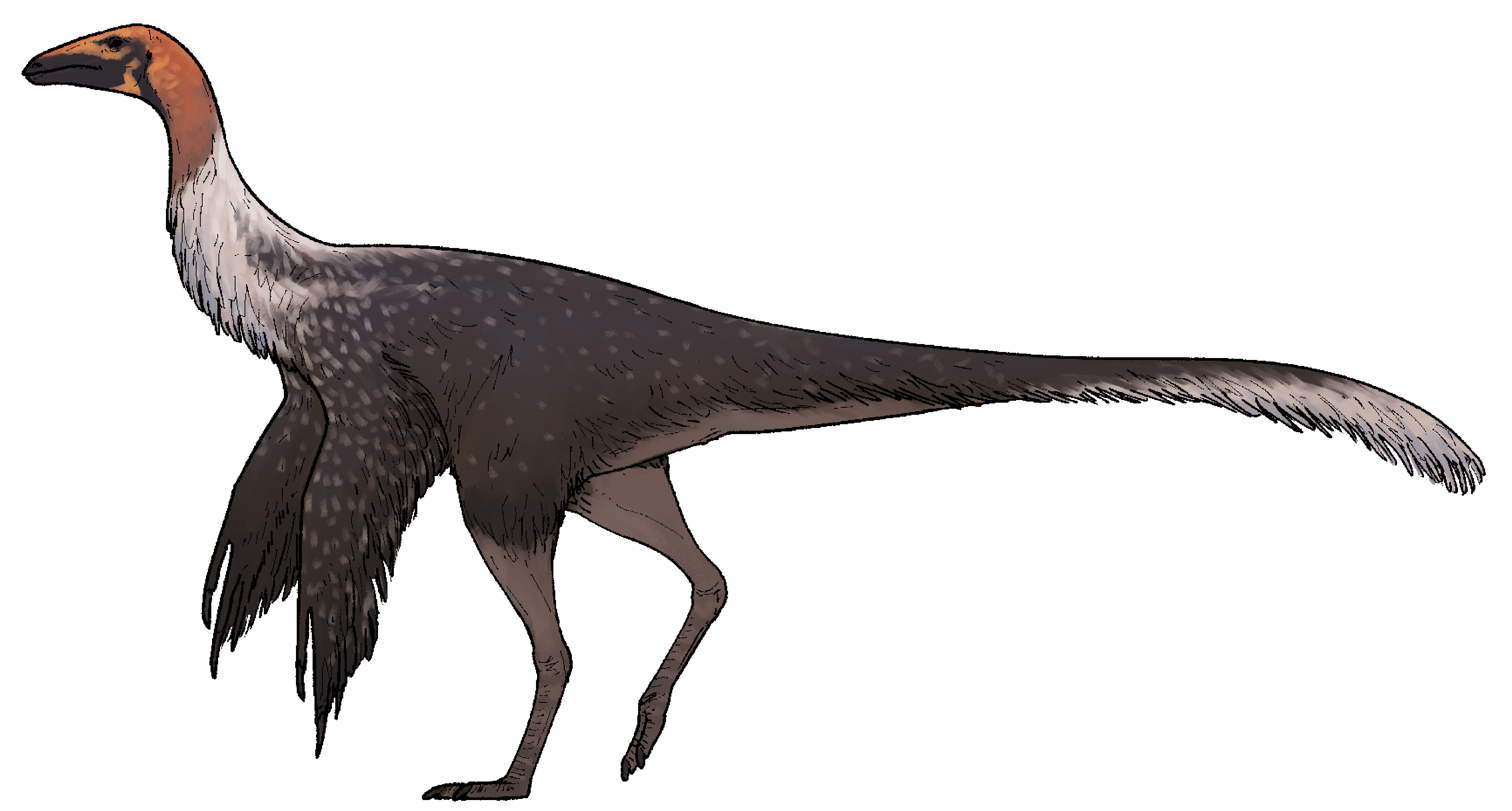
- Speculative life restoration

Scientific classification
- Kingdom: Animalia
- Phylum: Chordata
- Class: Reptilia
- Clade: Dinosauria
- Clade: Saurischia
- Clade: Theropoda
- Clade: †Ornithomimosauria
- Family: †Ornithomimidae
- Genus: †Mexidracon; Serrano-Brañas et al., 2025
- Species: †M. longimanus

Binomial name
- †Mexidracon longimanus Serrano-Brañas et al., 2025

= Mexidracon =

Mexidracon Temporal range: Late Cretaceous (Campanian), 72.5 Ma

Extinct genus of ornithomimid dinosaurs

Mexidracon (meaning "Mexican dragon") is an extinct genus of ornithomimid theropod dinosaurs from the late Cretaceous Cerro del Pueblo Formation of Coahuila, Mexico. The genus contains a single species, M. longimanus, known from a partial skeleton. Mexidracon is the second ornithomimosaur to be named from this formation, following the deinocheirid Paraxenisaurus in 2020.

== Discovery and naming ==
Mexidracon type locality in the Cerro del Pueblo Formation of Mexico

The Mexidracon holotype specimen, BENC 32/2-0001, was discovered by Claudio de León-Dávila in 2014 in the 'Loma Prieta' locality of the Cerro del Pueblo Formation (Difunta Group) near the town of Porvenir de Jalpa in General Cepeda Municipality of Coahuila, Mexico. The specimen is partially articulated, consisting of dorsal, sacral, and caudal vertebrae, chevrons, a partial left forelimb (humerus and metacarpals I–III), partial pelvic girdles, and partial hindlimbs (complete left femur and tibia, partial right femur and tibia, partial proximal fibulae, distal tarsals 3 and 4, left metatarsals II–IV, and four toe bones).

In 2025, Serrano-Brañas et al. described Mexidracon longimanus as a new genus and species of ornithomimid dinosaurs based on these fossil remains. The generic name, Mexidracon combines the prefix "Mexi-", referencing the discovery of the taxon in Mexico, with the suffix "-dracon", derived from the Greek word drakōn, meaning "dragon" or "serpent". The specific name, longimanus, is derived from Latin roots meaning "long hand", referencing the surprisingly elongate hands seen in this taxon.

== Description ==
Mexidracon is unique amongst ornithomimids for possessing extremely lengthened metacarpals. Serrano-Brañas et al. (2025) hypothesized that these long hands may have allowed it to more efficiently gather vegetation, a function proposed for other herbivorous theropods with long arms and large claws such as the deinocheirid Deinocheirus and therizinosaurs. Additionally, Mexidracon possesses a slightly longer femur than tibia which, along with the elongated hands, could suggest limited cursoriality compared to other ornithomimids. Differences are also noted between Mexidracon with the coeval ornithomimid specimen SEPCP 16/237, informally referred to as "Saltillomimus", that may reflect differences in habitat preferences. Based on comparisons of the limbs bones, "Saltillomimus" has a proportionally long tibia, broad feet, and splayed toes that suggest cursorial locomotion over soft, muddy surfaces. By contrast, a more slender foot is suggested for Mexidracon, suggesting it may have been ill-suited to traverse such terrain as efficiently.

== Classification ==
In their most resolved phylogenetic analysis, Serrano-Brañas et al. (2025) recovered Mexidracon in a polytomy with several other genera within the ornithomimosaur family Ornithomimidae. These results are displayed in the cladogram below:

- Ornithomimosauria
  - Nqwebasaurus
  - - Beishanlong
    - - Pelecanimimus
      - - Archaeornithomimus
        - - Harpymimus
          - - Tyrannomimus
            - Aviatyrannis
        - Deinocheiridae
          - Garudimimus
          - Deinocheirus
          - Paraxenisaurus
        - Ornithomimidae
          - Tototlmimus
          - Mexidracon
          - Sinornithomimus
          - Struthiomimus spp.
          - Gallimimus
          - Dzharacursor
          - Aepyornithomimus
          - - Ornithomimus
            - Anserimimus
            - Rativates

== See also ==
- Timeline of ornithomimosaur research
- 2025 in archosaur paleontology
