= Timeline of ornithomimosaur research =

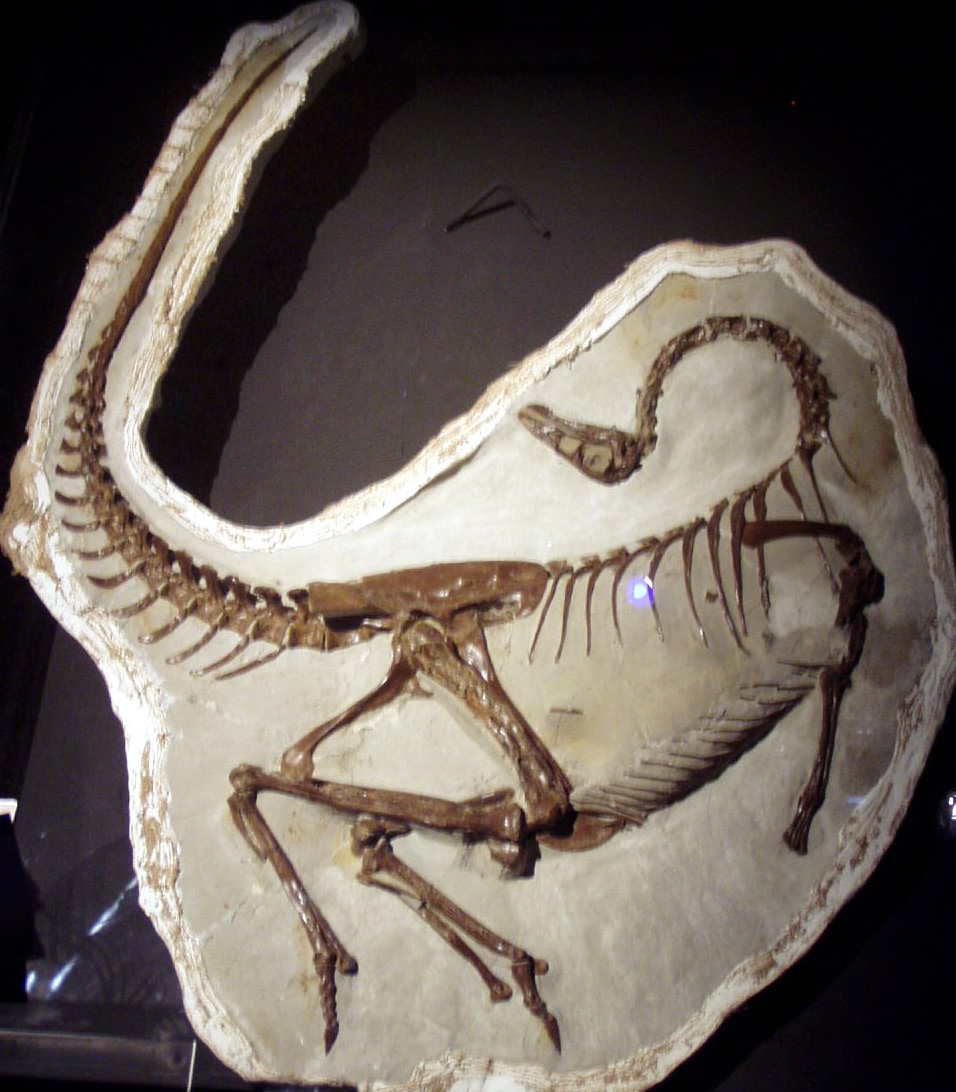
Skeleton of Ornithomimus edmontonicus

This timeline of ornithomimosaur research is a chronological listing of events in the history of paleontology focused on the ornithomimosaurs, a group of bird-like theropods popularly known as the ostrich dinosaurs. Although fragmentary, probable, ornithomimosaur fossils had been described as far back as the 1860s, the first ornithomimosaur to be recognized as belonging to a new family distinct from other theropods was Ornithomimus velox, described by Othniel Charles Marsh in 1890. Thus the ornithomimid ornithomimosaurs were one of the first major Mesozoic theropod groups to be recognized in the fossil record. The description of a second ornithomimosaur genus did not happen until nearly 30 years later, when Henry Fairfield Osborn described Struthiomimus in 1917. Later in the 20th century, significant ornithomimosaur discoveries began occurring in Asia. The first was a bonebed of "Ornithomimus" (now Archaeornithomimus) asiaticus found at Iren Debasu. More Asian discoveries took place even later in the 20th century, including the disembodied arms of Deinocheirus mirificus and the new genus Gallimimus bullatus. The formal naming of the Ornithomimosauria itself was performed by Rinchen Barsbold in 1976.

Early research into ornithomimosaur evolution was based on comparative anatomy. In 1972, Dale Russell argued that the Jurassic Elaphrosaurus of Africa was an ancestral relative of ornithomimids. The descriptions of Garudimimus and Harpymimus in the 1980s revealed the existence of primitive ornithomimosaurs outside of the Ornithomimidae proper. Subsequent research and discoveries during the 1990s refined science's knowledge of ornithomimosaur evolution. In 1994, Pelecanimimus polyodon was described from Europe, the first known ornithomimosaur from that continent and apparently a very evolutionarily primitive taxon. From the late 1990s into the early 21st century cladistic evidence mounted against Russell's hypothesis that ornithomimosaurs were descended from a close relative of Elaphrosaurus, and favored an ancestry close to Pelecanimimus. Paleontologists found that within the theropod family tree, ornithomimosaurs were primitive coelurosaurs closely related to, but outside of, the maniraptorans.

The juxtaposition of apparent evolutionary affinities to carnivorous dinosaurs with the possession of toothless beaks has led to controversy among paleontologists trying to reconstruct the diet of ornithomimosaurs. Osborn hypothesized in 1917 that ornithomimosaurs may have eaten plants, social insects, or aquatic invertebrates. In the 1970s paleontologists Russell, Halszka Osmolska, and her colleagues considered ornithomimosaurs carnivores that may have fed on insects, small vertebrates, or eggs. In the early to mid 1980s, however Russell and Elizabeth Nicholls began advocating a reinterpretation of ornithomimosaurs as herbivores. With the 1999 report of gastroliths in the new genus Sinornithomimus, came further support for reinterpreting ornithomimosaurs as herbivores or filter feeders rather than carnivores. In 2001, Mark Norell reported a comb-like structure in the beak of Gallimimus that may have been used for filter feeding, bringing renewed credibility to one of Osborn's 1917 hypotheses. If this interpretation of the evidence is correct, Gallimimus would be the largest terrestrial filter feeder in history.

== 19th century ==
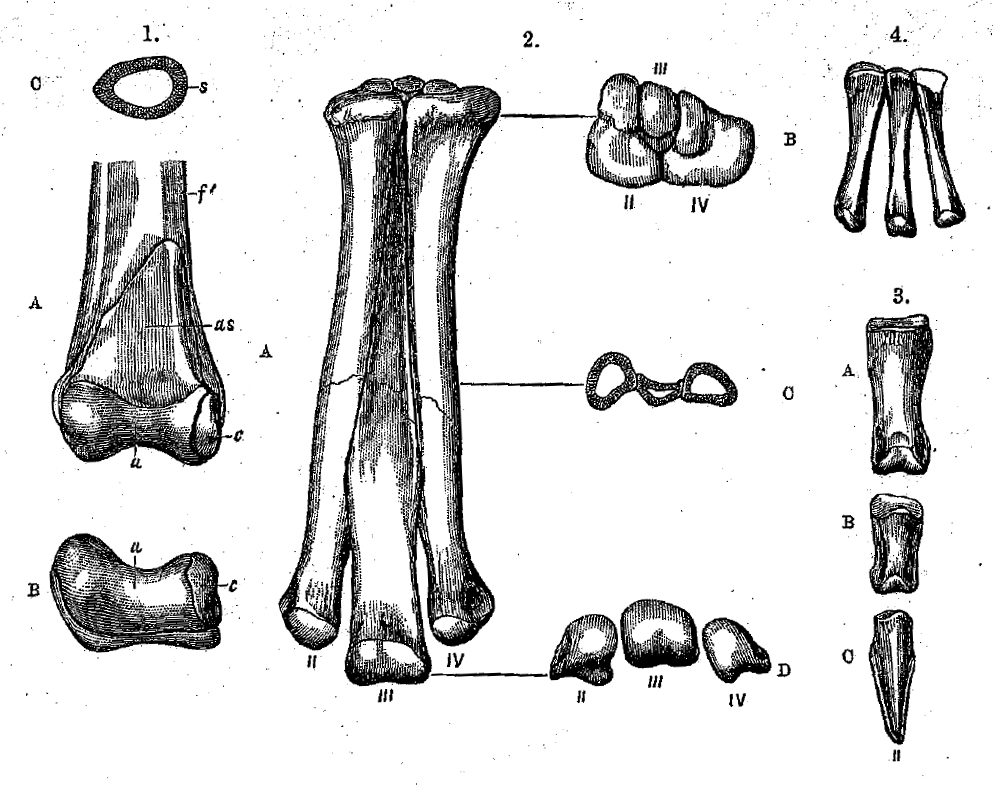
Holotype material of Ornithomimus velox

=== 1860s ===
==== 1865 ====
- Joseph Leidy described the new species Coelosaurus antiquus.

=== 1890s ===
==== 1890 ====
- Othniel Charles Marsh described the new genus and species Ornithomimus velox. He also described the new species Ornithomimus tenuis and erected a new family to house them, the Ornithomimidae.

==== 1892 ====
- Marsh described the new species Ornithomimus sedens.

== 20th century ==
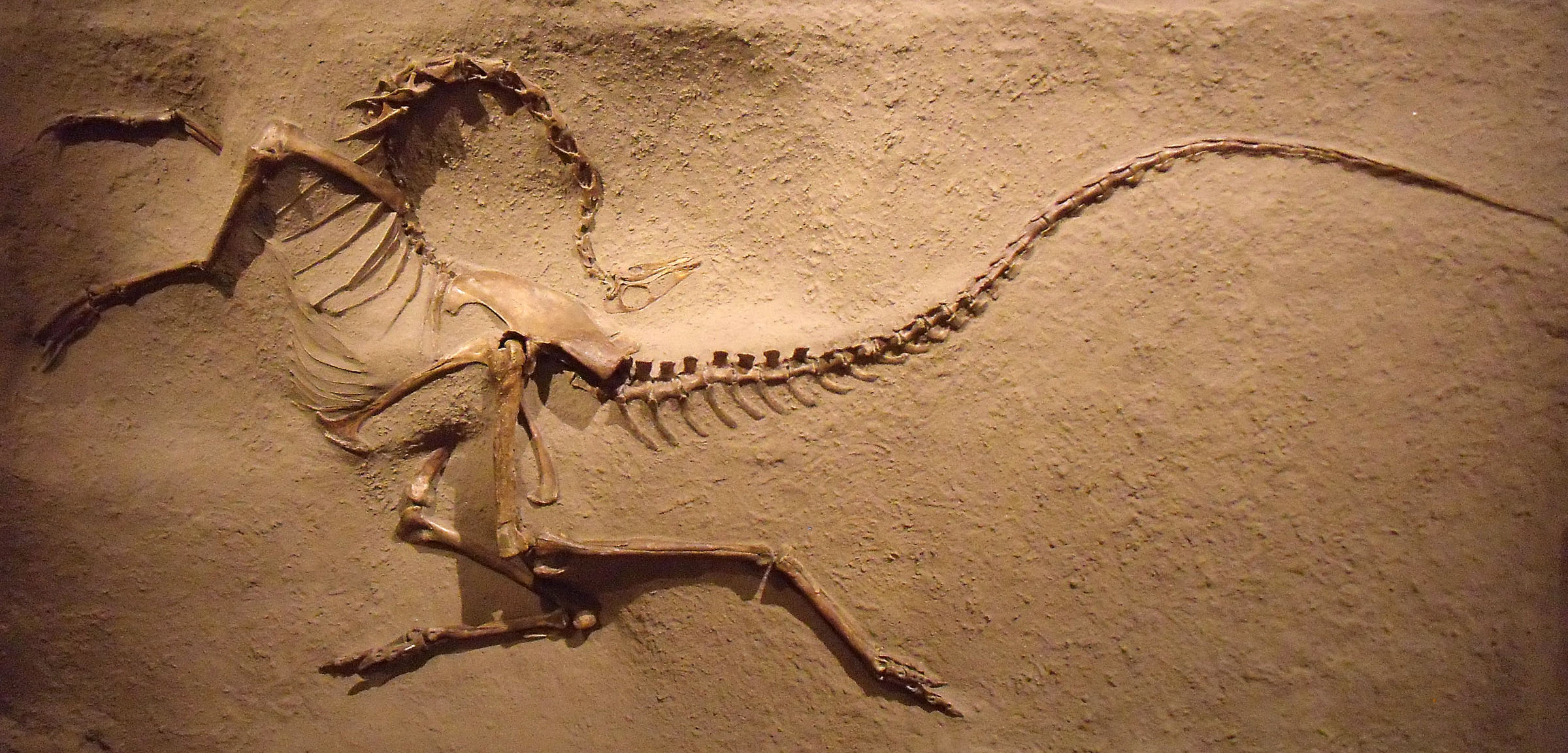
Cast of a Struthiomimus altus skeleton at the Royal Ontario Museum

=== 1900s ===
==== 1902 ====
- Lawrence Lambe described the new species Ornithomimus altus.

=== 1910s ===
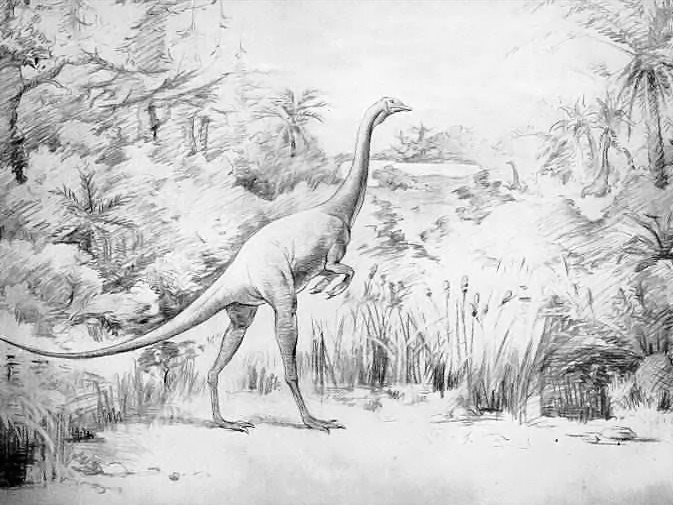
An early restoration of S. altus published in a 1921 issue of the magazine Natural History

==== 1917 ====
- Henry Fairfield Osborn reported the discovery of a more complete "Ornithomimus" altus specimen in Dinosaur Provincial Park, Alberta. He erected a new genus, Struthiomimus, for this species. Osborn put forth early speculations on the diet of ornithomimosaurs. He considered three possible diets: plants, social insects, and aquatic invertebrates.

=== 1920s ===
==== 1920 ====
- Charles Whitney Gilmore described the new species Coelosaurus affinis.

==== 1926 ====
- William Arthur Parks described the new species Struthiomimus brevitertius.

==== 1928 ====
- Parks described the new species Struthiomimus samueli.

=== 1930s ===
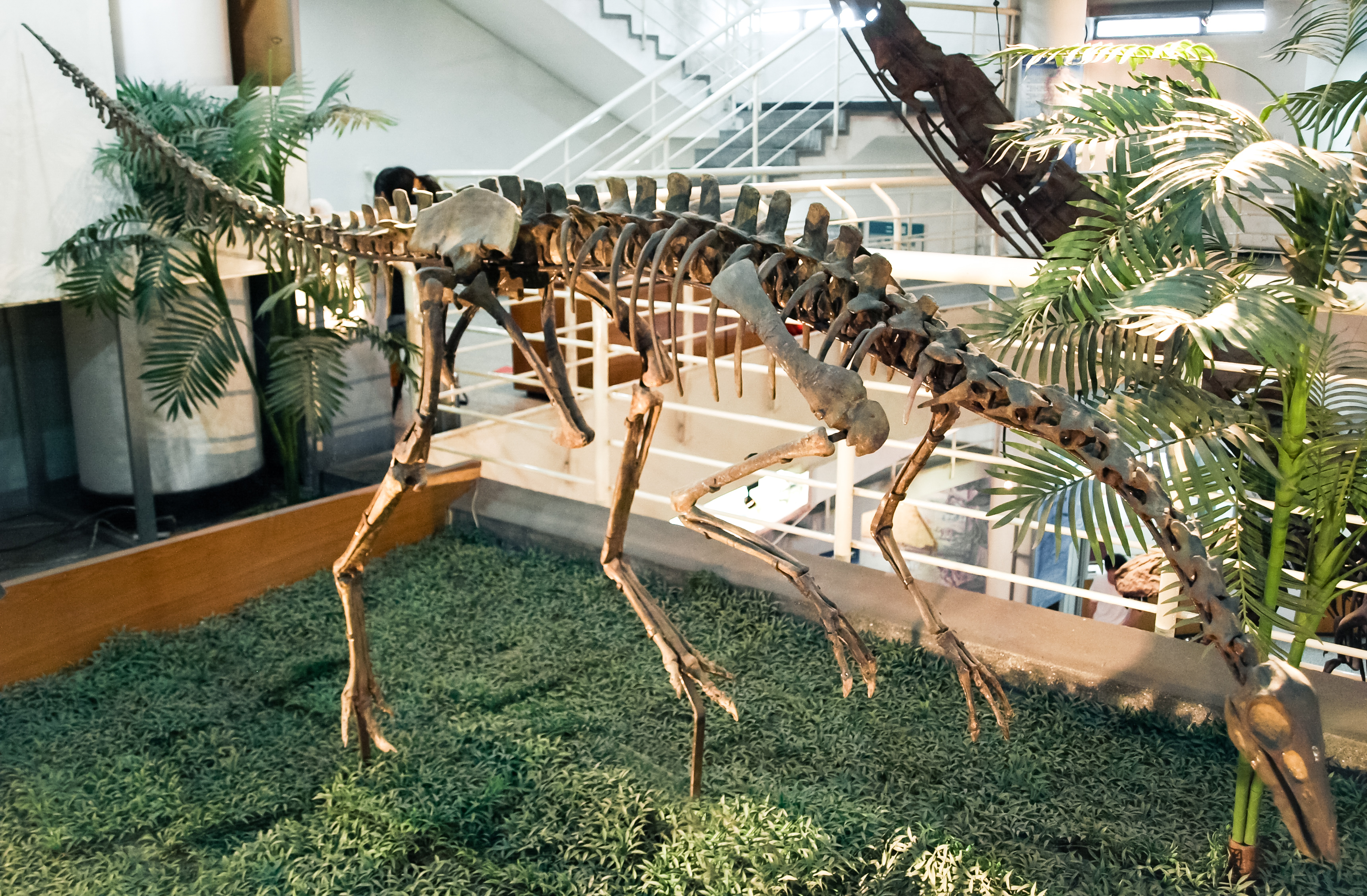
Skeletal mount of "Ornithmomimus" (now Archaeornithomimus) asiaticus

==== 1933 ====
- Gilmore described the new species Ornithomimus asiaticus. This was the first known ornithomimosaur to be discovered in Asia. The remains of multiple individuals were recovered from a bonebed at Iren Dabasu.
- Parks described the new species Struthiomimus currelli.
- Parks described the new species Struthiomimus ingens.
- Sternberg described the new species Ornithomimus edmontonicus.

=== 1960s ===
==== 1960 ====
- Lapparent described the new species Elaphrosaurus gautieri.

==== 1965 ====
- July: The type specimen of the dinosaur that would later be named Deinocheirus mirificus was discovered by Polish–Mongolian Palaeontological Expedition in Mongolia.

=== 1970s ===
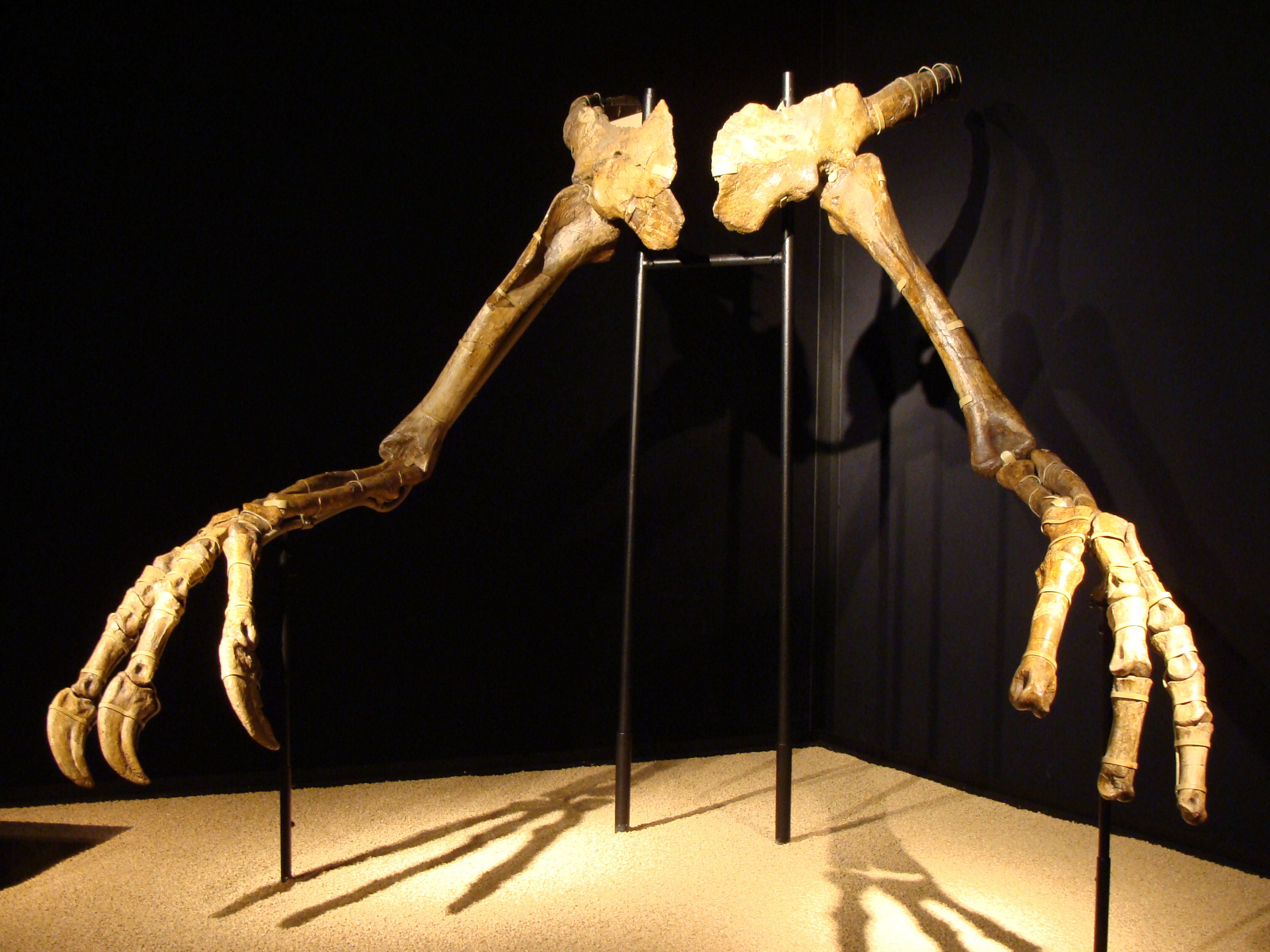
Holotype of Deinocheirus mirificus on display

==== 1970 ====
- Osmolska and Roniewicz, and Barsbold described the new genus and species Deinocheirus mirificus.

==== 1972 ====
- Russell published a review of the Late Cretaceous ornithomimids from North America. He also described the new genus Dromiceiomimus and classified two different species therein.
- Russell described the new genus Archaeornithomimus.
- Russell regarded a Late Jurassic theropod from Tanzania called Elaphrosaurus bambergi to be a primitive ornithomimosaur. This species would later be shown to be a coelophysoid.
- Russell concluded based on ornithomimid pelvic and leg anatomy that they could achieve similar running speeds to modern ostriches, but would not have been as maneuverable. He also observed that since the ornithomimosaur pelvic canal is wide compared to that of other dinosaur groups they may have laid only a few large eggs or even gave birth to live young.

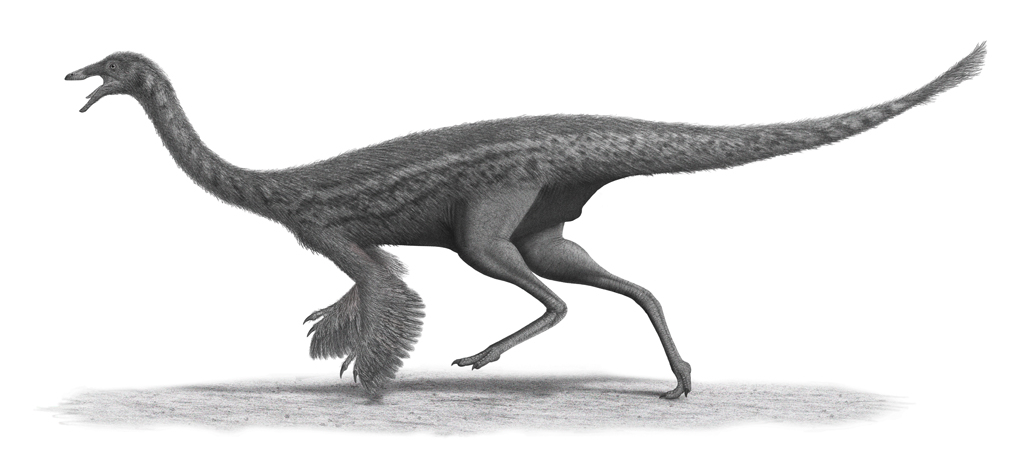
Life restoration of Gallimimus

- Ostrom "tentatively" classified the mysterious Deinocheirus mirificus as an ornithomimosaur.
- Osmolska, Roniewicz, and Barsbold described the new genus and species Gallimimus bullatus.
- Osmolska and others interpreted ornithomimosaurs as carnivores due to their membership in the theropoda, however, because of their beaked jaws were toothless he felt that only the smallest vertebrates and insects were suitable as prey. He also thought that ornithomimosaurs may have supplemented their diets with eggs.
- Osmolska and others suggested that ornithomimosaurs could use their forearms to dig.
- Russell interpreted ornithomimosaurs as carnivores due to their membership in the theropoda, however, because of their beaked jaws were toothless he felt that only the smallest vertebrates and insects were suitable as prey. He also thought that ornithomimosaurs may have supplemented their diets with eggs.

==== 1976 ====
- Barsbold formally named the Ornithomimosauria.

=== 1980s ===
==== 1981 ====
- Barsbold described the new genus and species Garudimimus brevipes. He added the family Garudimimidae to the ornithomimosaurs.
- Nicholls and Russell concluded that Dromiceiomimus was the same as Ornithomimus after all.
- Nicholls and Russell that ornithomimosaurs had little ability to rotate their forearms. This is evidence against the idea that ornithomimosaurs could use their arms to rake or dig. They also thought the first and second digits were somewhat opposable. The researchers concluded that ornithomimosaurs could use their arms to "gras[p] branches and fern fronds."

==== 1982 ====
- A paper by Galton and others accepted Russell's opinion that the Late Jurassic theropod Elaphrosaurus bambergi of Tanzania was a primitive ornithomimosaur. This species would later be shown to be a coelophysoid.

==== 1984 ====
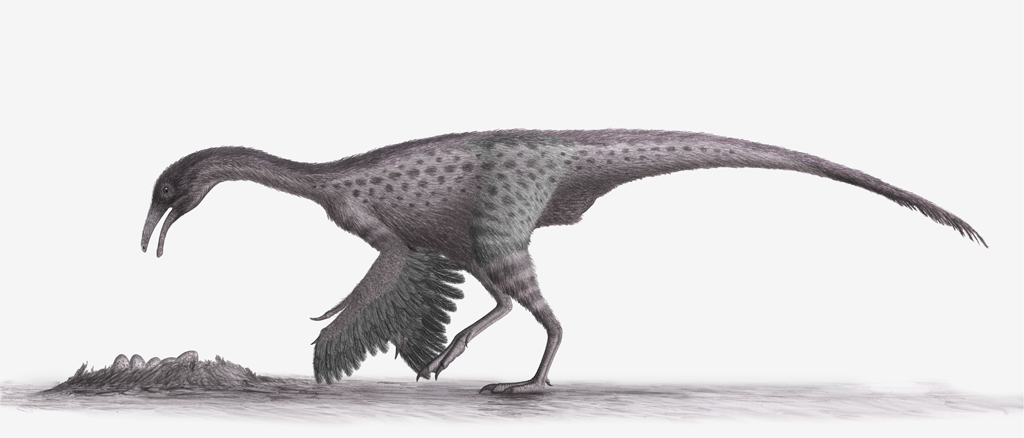
Artistic restoration of Harpymimus okladnikovi

- Barsbold and Perle described the new genus and species Harpymimus okladnikovi. Barsbold and Perle added the family Harpymimidae to the ornithomimosauria.

==== 1985 ====
- Nicholls and Russel noted similarities in the beaks of ornithomimosaurs and modern ratite birds and suggested that ornithomimosaurs may have shared the birds' herbivorous diet.
- Nicholls and Russell enumerated a list of anatomical traits shared by Deinocheirus and ornithomimosaurs.
- DeCourten and Russell reported a second specimen of Ornithomimus velox to the scientific literature, this one from the Kaiparowits Formation in Utah.

==== 1988 ====
- Barsbold described the new genus and species Anserimimus planinychus.
- Paul tentatively regarded Deinocheirus as an ornithomimosaur.

=== 1990s ===
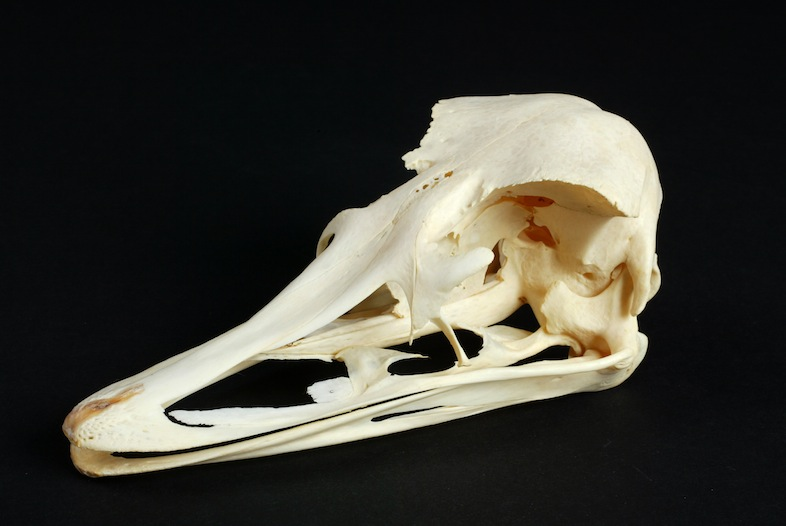
The beaks of ornithomimosaurs had deeper tips than ratites like the skull this ostrich.

==== 1990 ====
- Barsbold and Osmolska performed the first phylogenetic analysis of the internal evolutionary relationships of ornithomimosaurs. They also noted that unlike modern ratite birds, the tip of an ornithomimosaur's beak has a "deep edge". Barsbold and Osmolska further observed that ornithomimosaur remains were more common in wetter environments like Iren Debasu and Dinosaur Park Formation than more arid regions.
- Smith and Galton proposed a redefinition of the ornithomimidae that would include all taxa then regarded as ornithomimosaurian. Most scientists did not follow this suggestion, however.
- Thulborn noted that estimates for ornithomimosaur running speeds puts them between 35 and 60 km/h.

==== 1991 ====
- Yacobucci performed a cladistic analysis of ornithomimosaurs.

==== 1993 ====
- Currie and Eberth suggested that some fossils once thought to belong to Archaeornithomimus were actually Garudimimus remains. They also noted that some fossil eggs discovered at Iren Debasu in China may have been laid by ornithomimosaurs. However, without ornithomimosaur skeletal remains of either adults who could have laid the eggs or embryos inside them there is no solid evidence for this proposal.

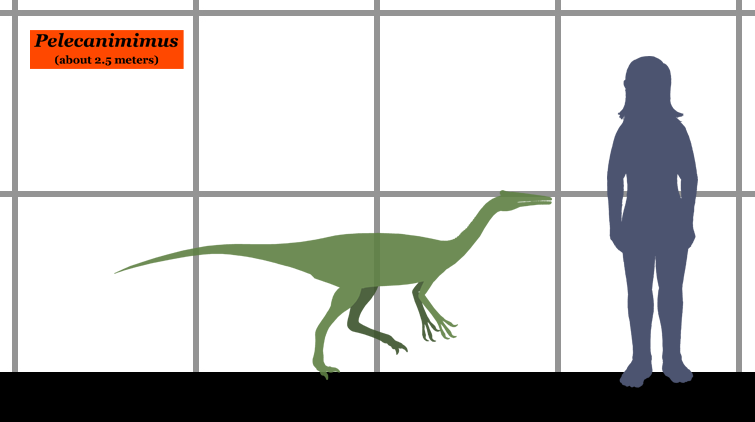
Estimated size of Pelecanimimus, compared to a human

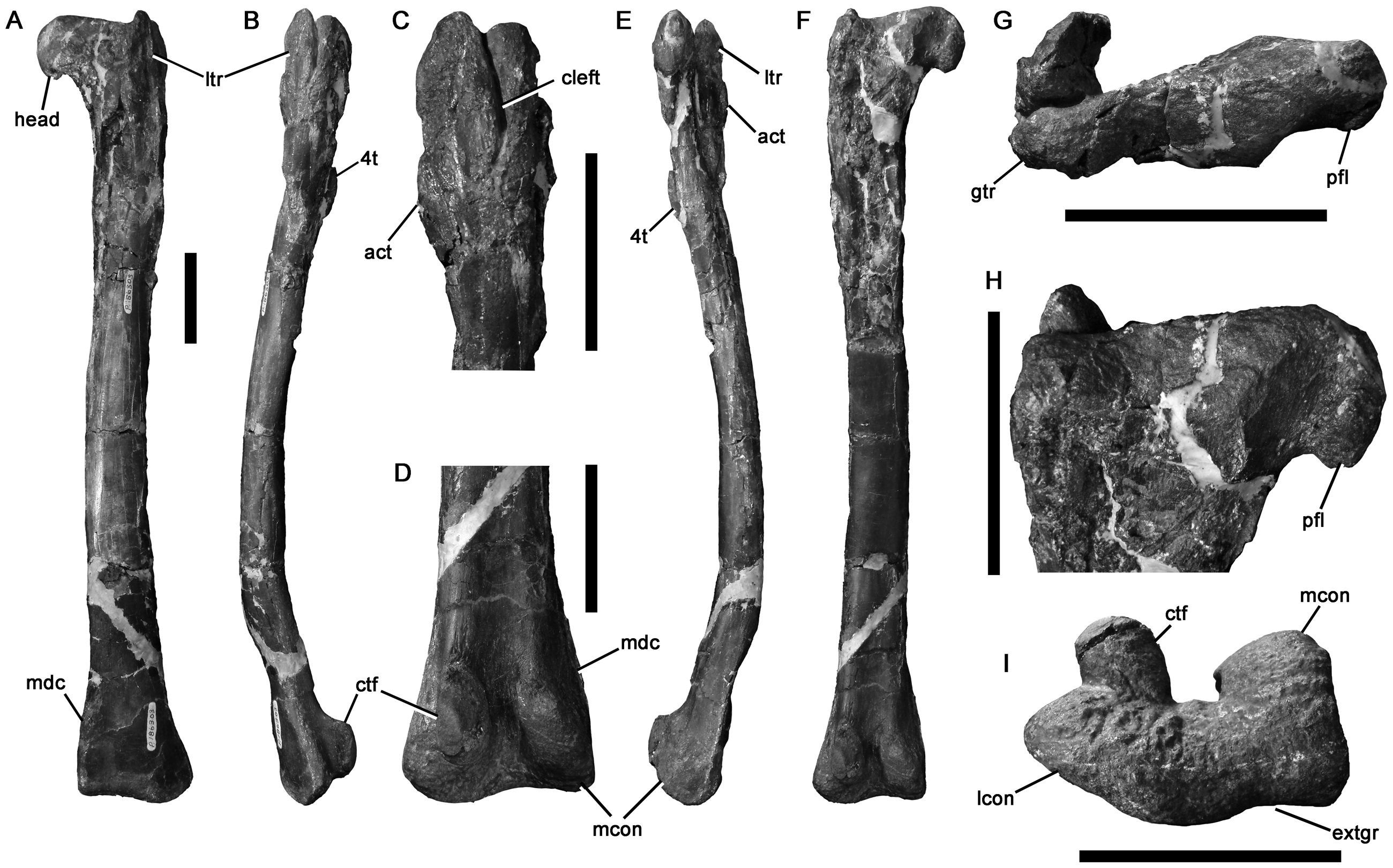
The femur of Timimus

- Sankar Chatterjee described the new genus and species Shuvosaurus inexpectatus. He interpreted the unusual reptile as the world's oldest and most primitive ornithomimosaur.

==== 1994 ====
- Perez-Moreno and other researchers described the new genus and species Pelecanimimus polyodon. The species was the first known ornithomimosaur from Europe. The researchers performed a cladistic analysis to uncover its evolutionary relationship with Garudimimus and Gallimimus, finding it to be more primitive than either one. IT was so primitive that it retained teeth. The tip of its jaws were filled 220 tiny teeth. The researchers interpreted these teeth as acting like a "cutting and ripping blade". They also debunked the idea that Garudimimus brevipes had a horn on its nose.
- Rich and Vickers-Rich described the new genus and species Timimus hermani.

==== 1995 ====
- Nessov described the new species Archaeornithomimus bissektensis.

==== 1997 ====
- Rauhut rejected Sankar Chatterjee's claim that Shuvosaurus inexpectatus of Late Triassic Texas was the world's oldest and most primitive ornithomimosaur because the anatomy of its braincase and palate were inconsistent with that of an ornithomimosaur.
- Osmolska published on ornithomimosaur evolutionary relationships.

==== 1998 ====
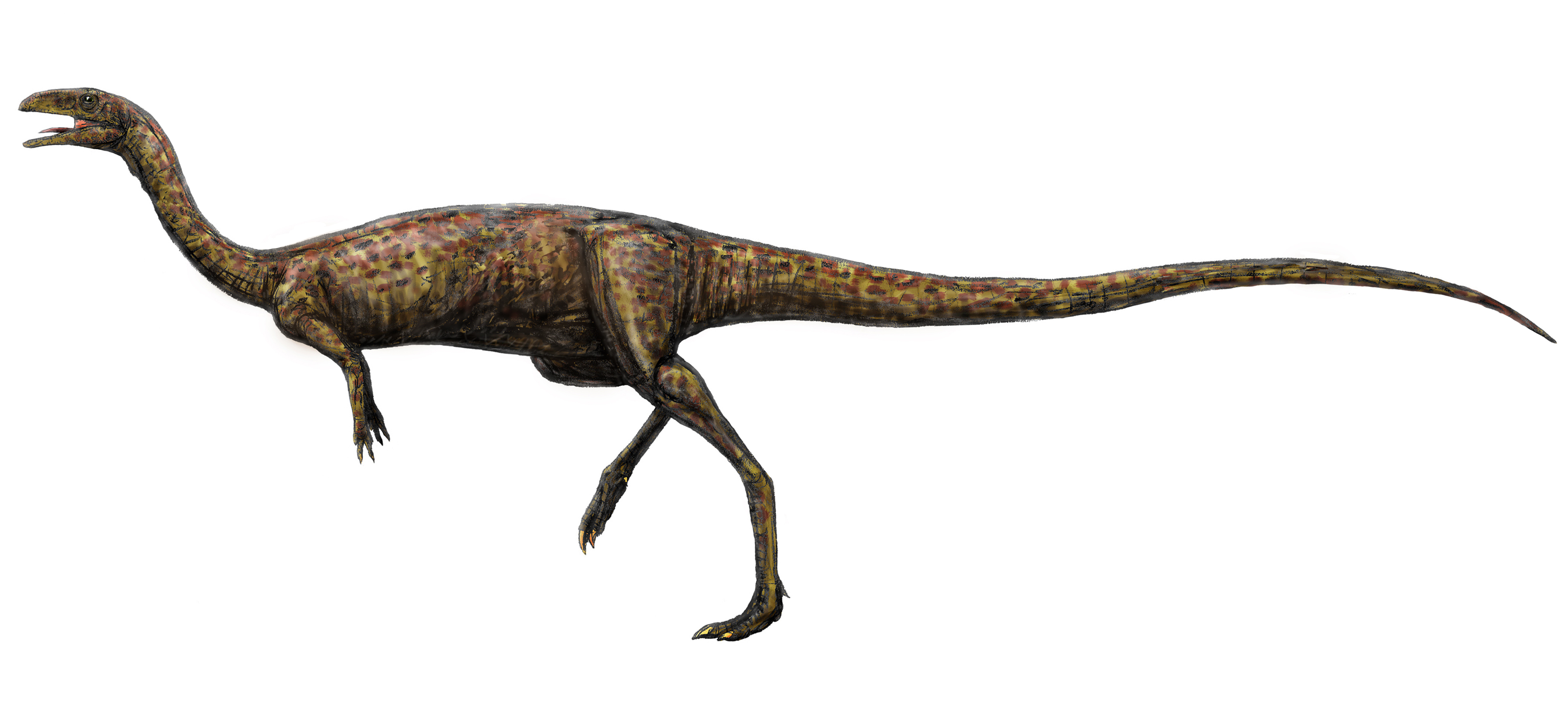
Artistic restoration of Elaphrosaurus bambergii.

- Sereno proposed a radical redefinition of the Ornithomimosauria as a stem based clade including all dinosaurs more closely related to Ornithomimus than to Shuuvuia. This definition would have vastly expanded the membership of Ornithomimosauria to not only include the ostrich dinosaurs but the alvarezsaurs and therizinosaurs as well.
- Taquet and Russell noted commonalities in the teeth of Pelecanimimus polyodon with those of spinosaurids and proposed that it may actually be a member of that group rather than an ornithomimosaur. This reclassification met with little support.

==== 1999 ====
- Padian and other researchers published a paper noting that Paul Sereno's revised definition of the Ornithomimosauria was basically the same as that of a clade proposed in 1996 by Thom Holtz called the Arctometatarsalia. Padian and the others proposed a new redefinition of Ornithomimosauria as the node based clade including those dinosaur descended from the most recent common ancestor shared by Pelecanimimus and Ornithomimus. This definition preserved the classification of the traditional ostrich dinosaurs as members.
- Paul Sereno performed a cladistic analysis which concluded that Elaphrosaurus bambergi of Late Jurassic Tanzania was actually a coelophysoid rather than a primitive ornithomimosaur as interpreted by Russell. He also drew some conclusions regarding ornithomimosaur biogeography, noting that they apparently crossed the Bering land bridge less readily than hadrosaurs and pachycephalosaurs during the Cretaceous.
- Kobayashi and others reported the discovery of gastroliths in the dinosaur that would later be named Sinornithomimus. The presence, abundance, and size of the gastroliths were all similar to those of modern herbivorous and filter feeding birds. Likewise there was no evidence for vertebrate prey in the diet of Sinornithomimus, which could have come in the form of bone fragments or apatite in the sediments enclosing the gastroliths. The remains of multiple individuals were recovered from a bonebed in Ulansuhai.

== 21st century ==
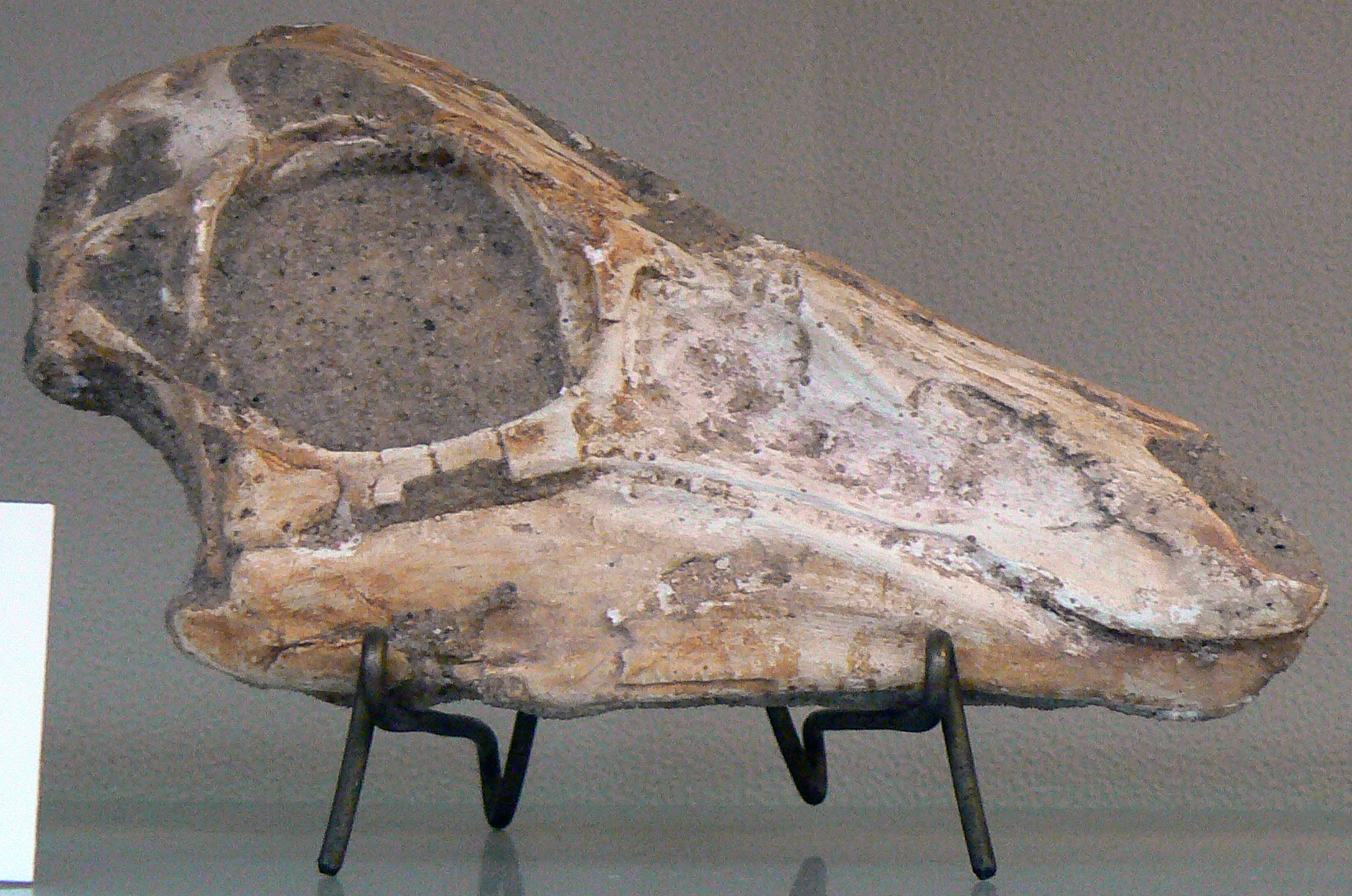
Skull of Gallimimus

=== 2000s ===
==== 2001 ====
- Thom Holtz performed another cladistic analysis which concluded that Elaphrosaurus bambergi of Late Jurassic Tanzania was actually a coelophysoid rather than a primitive ornithomimosaur as interpreted by Russell.
- Norell and others performed a cladistic analysis of the Coelurosauria. The researchers included five ornithomimosaur taxa in this analysis.
- Norell and others reported a comb-like structure in the beak of Gallimimus that may have been used for filter feeding. If so, it would be the largest terrestrial filter feeder in history. They also observed that ornithomimosaurs seem to have been rare or absent in relatively dry paleoenvironments, like that of the Djadokhta Formation.
- Jørn H. Hurum published a detailed description of a complete lower jaw bone from Gallimimus bullatus. He noted new features in the "paper thin" jaw and corrects minor mistakes made in previous reconstructions of the lower jaw of G. bullatus. Hurum suggests that a "large widening of the anterior end of the prearticular" is an apomorphy for Gallimimus bullatus. He also notes that the tight intramandibular joint would prevent any movement in the front and rear portions of the lower jaw.

==== 2002 ====
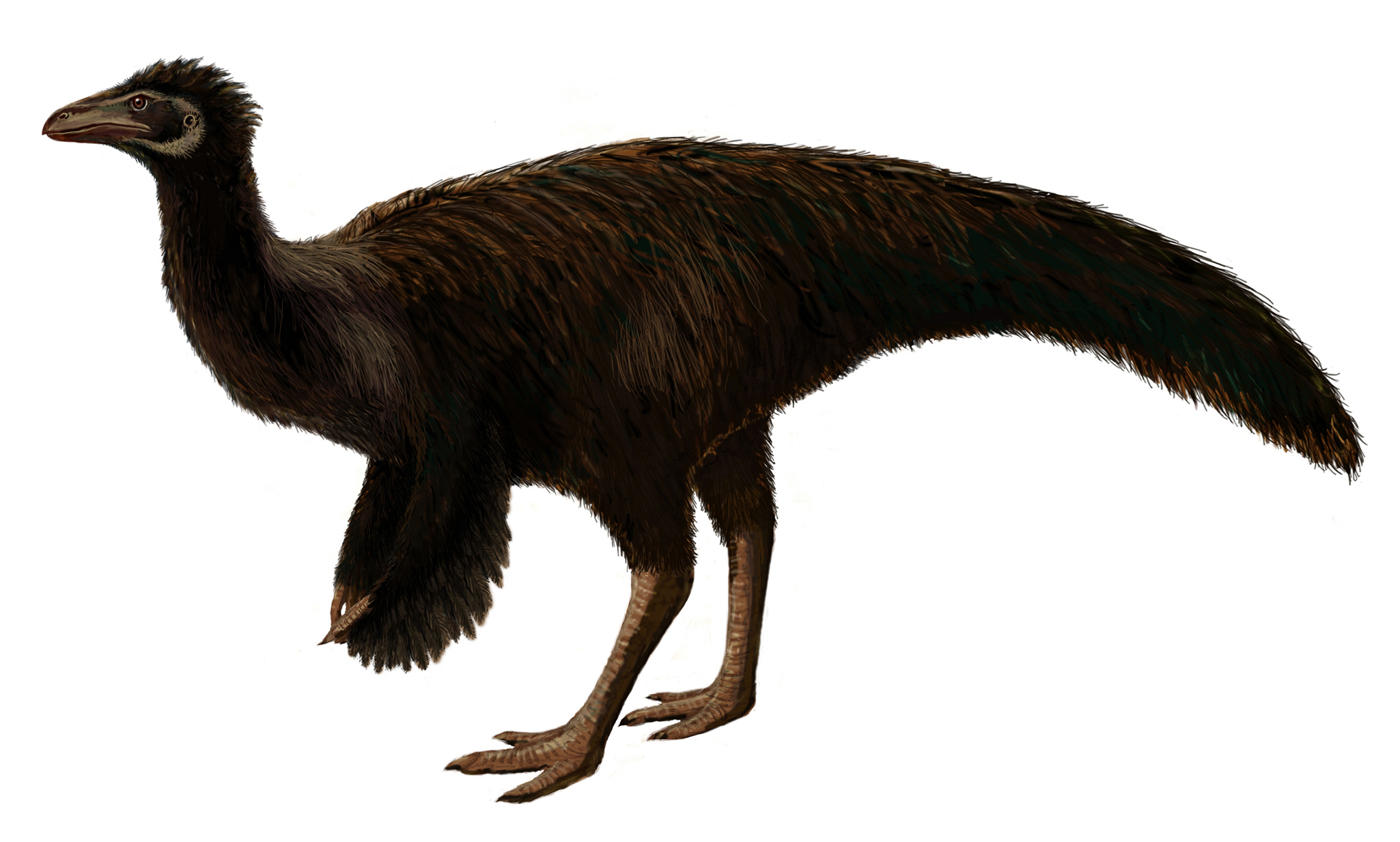
Sinornithomimus

- Xu and others performed a cladistic analysis of the Coelurosauria. The researchers included five ornithomimosaur taxa in this analysis.

==== 2003 ====
- Ji and other researchers described the new genus and species Shenzhousaurus orientalis. The researchers also performed a cladistic analysis of coelurosaur evolutionary relationships, including ornithomimosaurs.
- Kobayashi and Lu described the new genus and species Sinornithomimus dongi.
- Kobayashi and Lu performed a cladistic analysis including all ornithomimosaurs then recognized, with the exception of Shenzhousaurus.

==== 2006 ====
- The Korea-Mongolia International Dinosaur Project discovered a new specimen of the mysterious Mongolian dinosaur Deinocheirus, specimen now catalogued as MPC-D 100/128. This specimen had also been damaged by fossil poachers.

==== 2009 ====
- Buffetaut, Suteethorn, and Tong described the new genus and species Kinnareemimus khonkaenensis.
- The Korea-Mongolia International Dinosaur Project discovered another specimen of Deinocheirus. This specimen is now catalogued as MPC-D 100/127. Like the 2006 Deinocheirus find, MPC-D 100/127 also been damaged by fossil poachers, who stole its skull, hands, and feet. The stolen specimens were later found to have been sold to a Japanese collector, who then resold the fossils to a German collector.

=== 2010s ===
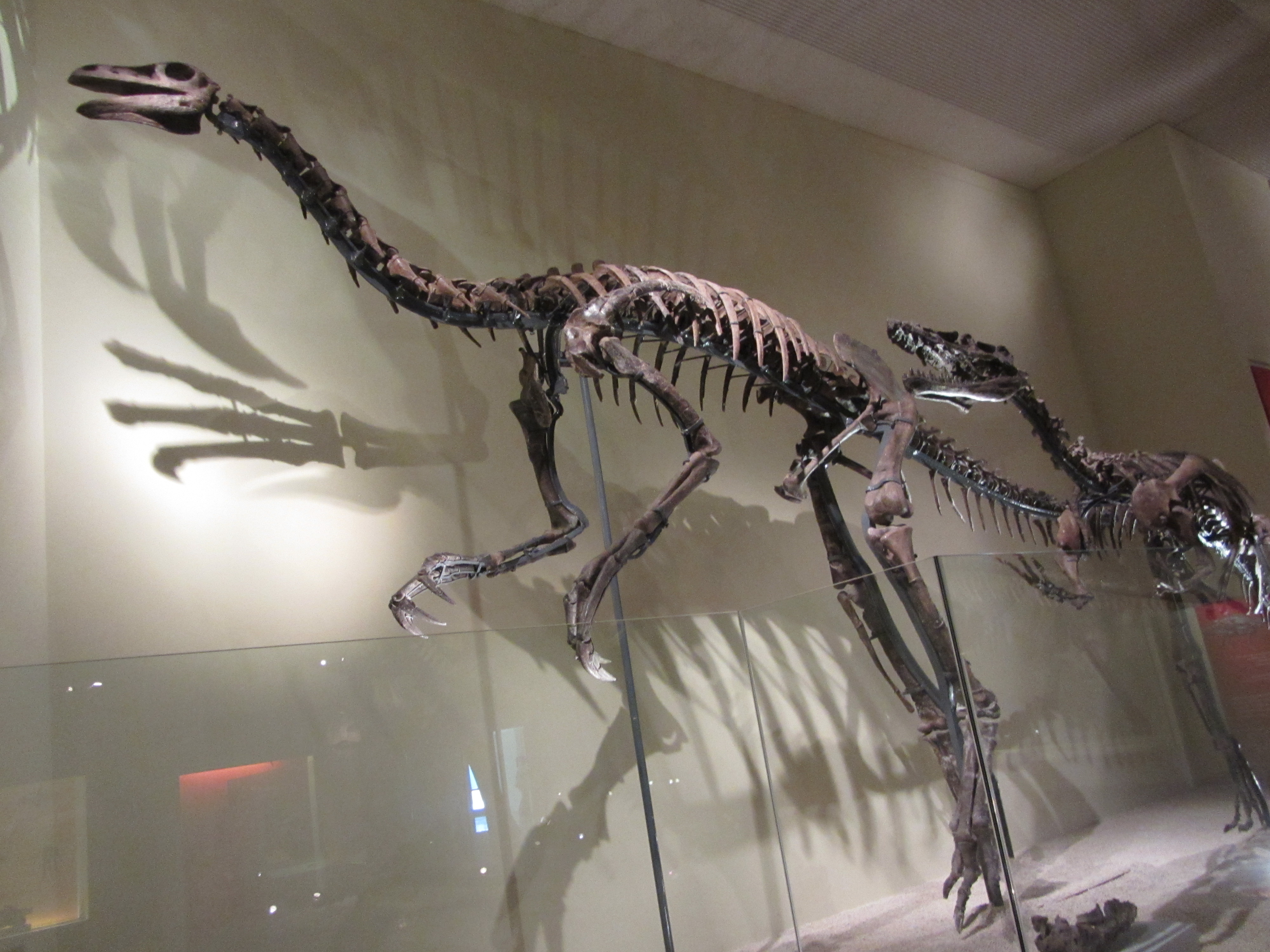
Skeletal mount of Beishanlong

==== 2010 ====
- Makovicky and others described the new genus and species Beishanlong grandis.

==== 2011 ====
- French fossil dealer François Escuillié noticed some unusual fossils kept by a private collector in Europe. He alerted Belgian paleontologist Pascal Godefroit about the strange finds. Godefroit realized that these fossils might be those poached from the Deinocheirus specimens recently excavated by the joint Korean-Mongolian team in the Gobi Desert. He contacted the researchers and it was found that the strange, privately owned fossils fit together with the 2009 specimen like puzzle pieces. The collector was willing to part with the specimens after being informed of their scientific value. After obtaining the specimens, Escuillié donated them to the Royal Belgian Institute of Natural Sciences where Godefroit worked.
- May 1st: Escuillié and Godefroit returned the recovered poached Deinocheirus remains to the Mongolian government.
- Xu and others described the new genus and species Qiupalong henanensis.

==== 2012 ====
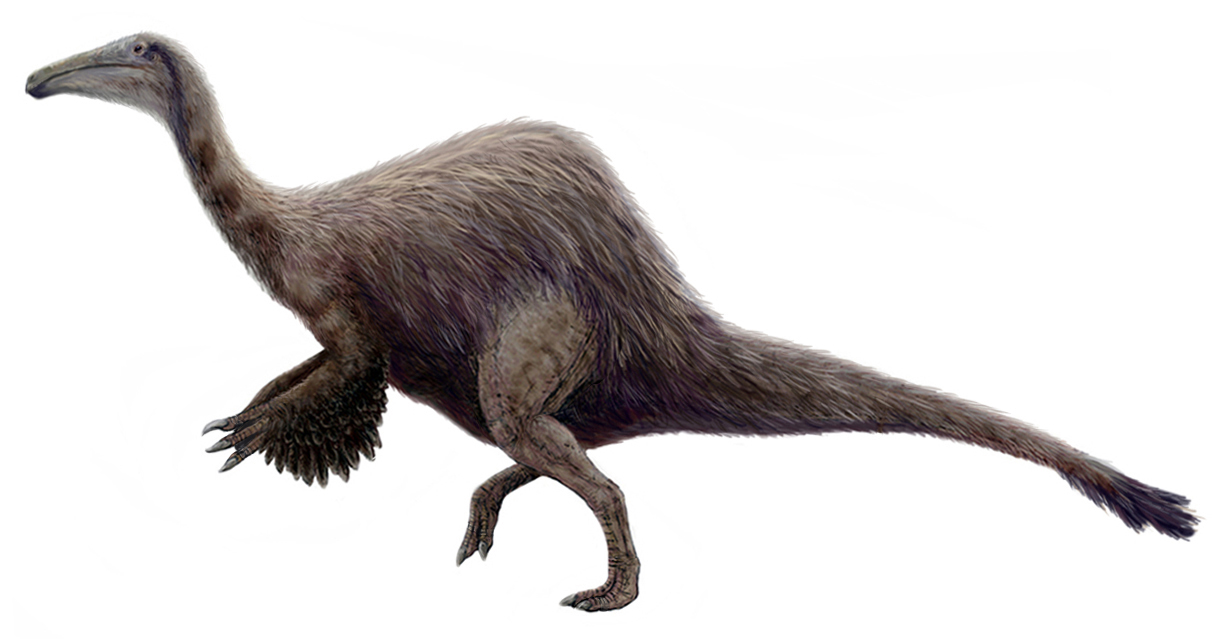
Artist's restoration of Deinocheirus

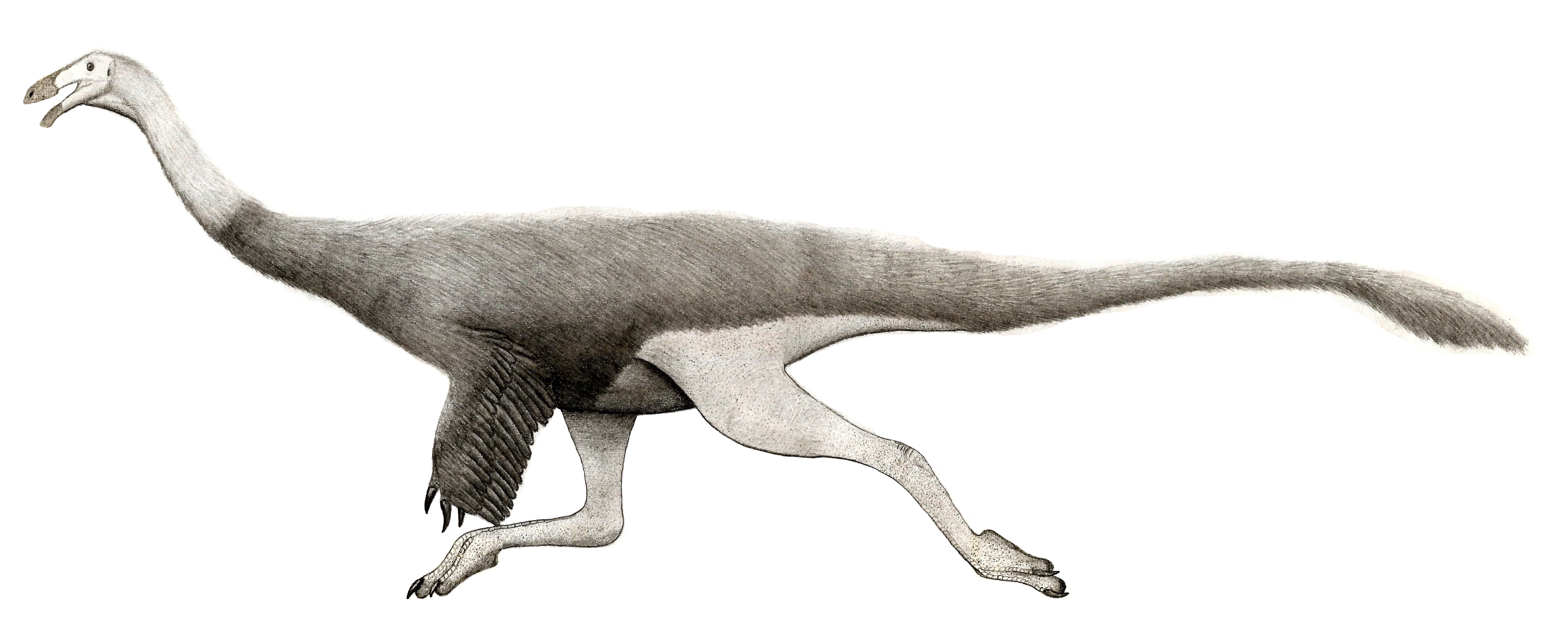
Artist's restoration of Tototlmimus

- Jin, Chen and Godefroit described the new genus and species Hexing qingyi.

==== 2014 ====
- Yuong-Nam Lee and others described the life appearance and paleobiology of Deinocheirus, characterizing it as follows:
  Deinocheirus was a heavily built, non-cursorial animal with an elongate snout, a deep jaw, tall neural spines, a pygostyle, a U-shaped furcula, an expanded pelvis for strong muscle attachments, a relatively short hind limb and broad-tipped pedal unguals. Ecomorphological features in the skull, more than a thousand gastroliths, and stomach contents (fish remains) suggest that Deinocheirus was a megaomnivore that lived in mesic environments.
  — Lee et al.

==== 2015 ====
- Serrano-Brañas and others described the new genus and species Tototlmimus packardensis.
- Alifanov and Saveliev describe the new theropod dinosaur, Lepidocheirosaurus natatilis from the Upper Jurassic deposits of the Transbaikal Area, Russia.

==== 2017 ====
- Tsogtbaatar and others described the new genus and species Aepyornithomimus tugrikinensis.
- Sereno described the new genus and species Afromimus tenerensis.

==== 2018 ====
- Hunt and Quinn described the new genus and species Arkansaurus fridayi.

==== 2019 ====
- Description of an ornithomimid specimen UALVP 16182, putatively assigned to the genus Dromiceiomimus, and a study on the validity of this genus is published by Macdonald & Currie (2019).

=== 2020s ===
==== 2020 ====
- Serrano-Brañas and others describe Paraxenisaurus normalensis, the first deinocheirid ornithomimosaur from the Cerro del Pueblo Formation of Coahuila, Mexico.

==== 2022 ====
- Tsogtbaatar and others describe ornithomimosaur materials from the Upper Cretaceous Santonian Eutaw Formation of Appalachia.
- Nottrodt describes the first articulated ornithomimid remains found from the Scollard Formation, TMP 1993.104.1, which represent a juvenile specimen, extending the stratigraphic range of Ornithomimus within Alberta.
- Allian and others describe the Berriasian age Angeac-Charente Lagerstätte of France, which is dominated by an ornithomimosaur herd of at least 70 individuals.

== See also ==
- History of paleontology
  - Timeline of paleontology
- Timeline of oviraptorosaur research
- Timeline of therizinosaur research
