= 1972 in paleontology =

Paleontology or palaeontology is the study of prehistoric life forms on Earth through the examination of plant and animal fossils. This includes the study of body fossils, tracks (ichnites), burrows, cast-off parts, fossilised feces (coprolites), palynomorphs and chemical residues. Because humans have encountered fossils for millennia, paleontology has a long history both before and after becoming formalized as a science. This article records significant discoveries and events related to paleontology that occurred or were published in the year 1972.

== Bryophytes ==
Name	Novelty	Status	Authors	Age	Type locality	Location	Notes	Images
Muscites eocenicus	Sp nov	jr synonym	Kuc	Ypresian	Allenby Formation	Canada; British Columbia	A bartramiaceous moss moved to Plagiopodopsis eocenicus in 1980	

== Mollusca ==
=== Bivalves ===
Name	Novelty	Status	Authors	Age	Unit	Location	Notes	Images
Concavodonta	Gen. et sp. nov.	Valid	Babin & Melou	Ordovician		Europe	New genus for Nucula ponderata.	

== Archosauromorphs ==
=== Newly named archosauromorphs ===
Name	Novelty	Status	Authors	Age	Unit	Location	Notes	Images
Azendohsaurus	Gen. et sp. nov.	Valid	Dutuit	Late Triassic	Argana Formation	Morocco	A herbivorous archosauromorph.	

=== Newly named pseudosuchians ===
Name	Novelty	Status	Authors	Age	Unit	Location	Notes	Images
Gracilisuchus	Gen. et sp. nov.	Valid	Romer	Late Triassic (Carnian)	Chañares Formation	Argentina		Gracilisuchus

=== Newly named dinosauriforms ===
Name	Novelty	Status	Authors	Age	Unit	Location	Notes	Images
Lewisuchus	Gen. et sp. nov.	Valid	Romer	Late Triassic (Carnian)	Chañares Formation	Argentina	A silesaurid.	

=== Newly named dinosaurs ===
Data courtesy of George Olshevsky's dinosaur genera list.

Name	Novelty	Status	Authors	Age	Unit	Location	Notes	Images
Archaeornithomimus	Gen. et sp. nov.	Valid	Russell	Late Cretaceous (Cenomanian)	Iren Dabasu Formation	China	An ornithomimid.	Archaeornithomimus asiaticus
Dromiceiomimus	Gen. et sp. nov.	Valid	Russell	Maastrichtian	Horseshoe Canyon Formation	Canada	An ornithomimid, possibly a synonym of Ornithomimus.	Dromiceiomimus
Gallimimus	Gen. et sp. nov.	Valid	Osmólska, Roniewicz Barsbold	Late Cretaceous (Maastichtian)	Nemegt Formation	Mongolia	An ornithomimid.	Gallimimus
"Thotobolosaurus"		Nomen nudum	Ellenberger	Late Triassic (Norian)		Lesotho	Formally named Kholumolumo in 2020.	
Vulcanodon	Gen. et sp. nov.	Valid	Raath	Early Jurassic (Sinemurian-Pliensbachian)	Batoka Formation	Zimbabwe	A sauropod.	

=== Newly named birds ===
Name	Novelty	Status	Authors	Age	Unit	Location	Notes	Images
Anserobranta tarabukini	Gen. nov. et Sp. nov.	Valid	Evgeny N. Kurochkin I. M. Ganya	Late Miocene	MN 9	Soviet Union: Moldova	An Anatidae, this is the type species of the new genus.	
Aptenodytes ridgeni	Sp. nov.	Valid	George G. Simpson	Late Pliocene	Waititaran	New Zealand	A Spheniscidae.	
Apus submelba	Sp. nov.	Valid	Dénes Jánossy	Middle Pleistocene	MQ 2A	Hungary	An Apodidae.	
Ardeagrandis arborea	Gen. nov. et Sp. nov.	Valid	Evgeny N. Kurochkin I. M. Ganya	Late Miocene	MN 9	Soviet Union: Moldova	An Ardeidae.	
Eostrix martinellii	Sp. nov.	Valid	Larry D. Martin Craig Call Black	Early Eocene	Wind River Formation	USA: Wyoming	A Strigiformes, Protostrigidae Wetmore, 1933.	
Mergus connectens	Sp. nov.	Valid	Dénes Jánossy	Early Pleistocene	MQ 1b	Czech Republic; Romania	An Anatidae.	
Miocitta galbreathi	Gen. nov. et Sp. nov.	Valid	Pierce Brodkorb	Late Miocene	Kenmesaw Local Fauna	USA: Colorado	A Corvidae, this is the type species of the new genus.	
Otis kalmani	Sp. nov.	Valid	Dénes Jánossy	Early Pleistocene	MQ 1a	Romania	An Otididae.	
Paraptenodytes brodkorbi	Sp. nov.	Synonym of Paraptenodytes robustus (Ameghino, 1895).	George G. Simpson	Early Miocene	Patagonian Formation	Argentina	A Spheniscidae, placed in synonymy with Paraptenodytes robustus (Ameghino, 1895) by Carolina Acosta Hospitaleche, 2005, but Sara Bertelli, Norberto P. Giannini & Daniel T. Ksepka, 2006 disagree with her and say it needs another genus.	
Phalacrocorax lautus	Sp. nov.	Valid	Evgeny N. Kurochkin I. M. Ganya	Late Miocene		Soviet Union: Moldova	A Phalacrocoracidae.	
Probalearica moldavica	Sp. nov.	Valid	Evgeny N. Kurochkin I. M. Ganya	Late Miocene	MN 9	Soviet Union: Moldova	A Gruidae, transferred to the genus Grus by Jíří Mlíkovský, 2002.	
Protocitta ajax	Sp. nov.	Valid	Pierce Brodkorb	Late Pliocene	Blancan	USA: Texas; Kansas	A Corvidae, sometimes placed in the genus Calocitta G. R. Gray, 1841.	
Pygoscelis tyreei	Sp. nov.	Valid	George G. Simpson	Late Pliocene	Waititaran	New Zealand	A Spheniscidae.	
Rustaviornis georgicus	Gen. nov. et Sp. nov.	Valid	Nikolay I. Burchak-Abramovich G. K. Meladze	Late Miocene Sarmantian	Hipparion Fauna	Soviet Union: Georgia	A Phasianidae, this is the type species of the new genus.	
Strix collongensis	Sp. nov.	Valid	Peter Ballmann	Middle Miocene	Mn 5	France	A Strigidae, transferred to and made the type species of the new genus Alasio by Jirí Mlíkovský, 1998.	
Surnia capeki	Sp. nov.	Valid	Dénes Jánossy	Early Pleistocene	MQ 1b	Czech Republic	A Strigidae.	
Tertiariaporphyrula lungi	Sp. nov.	Valid	Evgeny N. Kurochkin I. M. Ganya	Late Miocene	MN 9-11	Soviet Union: Moldova	A Rallidae, transferred to the genus Palaeoaramides Lambrecht, 1933 by Storrs L. Olson, 1977. Subsequently, made the type species of a separate genus Mioporphyrula by Zelenkov (2015).	
Tyto noeli	Sp. nov.	Valid	Oscar Arredondo	Late Pleistocene	Cave deposits	Cuba	A Tytonidae.	
Tyto riveroi	Sp. nov.	Valid	Oscar Arredondo	Pleistocene	Cave deposits	Cuba	A Tytonidae.	

== Synapsids ==
=== Newly named therapsids ===
Name	Novelty	Status	Authors	Age	Unit	Location	Notes	Images
Regisaurus	Gen. et sp. nov.	Valid	Mendrez	Early Triassic		South Africa	A regisaurid therocephalian.	Regisaurus jacobi.

=== Mammalian ===
Name	Novelty	Authors	Age	Type Locality	Country	Notes
Stenailurus teilhardi	Gen. et. sp. nov.	Crusafont-Pairo & Aguirre	Late Miocene (Turolian)		Spain	

== Other Animals ==
Name	Novelty	Status	Authors	Age	Unit	Location	Notes	Images
Brachina	Gen. and sp. nov.	Valid	Wade	Ediacaran		Australia	The type species is B. delicata.	
Dickinsonia brachina	Sp. nov.	Synonym of Dickinsonia tenuis	Wade	Ediacaran		Australia		
Dickinsonia lissa	Sp. nov.	Synonym of Dickinsonia tenuis	Wade	Ediacaran		Australia		
Eoporpita	Gen. and sp. nov.	Valid	Wade	Ediacaran		Australia	The type species is E. medusa.	
Kimberella	Nom. nov.	Valid	Wade	Ediacaran		Australia	A replacement name for Kimberia Glaessner & Wade (1966).	
Rangea sibirica	Sp. nov.	Synonym of Charnia masoni	Sokolov	Ediacaran		Russia		
Rugoconites tenuirugosus	Sp. nov.	Valid	Wade	Ediacaran		Australia		
