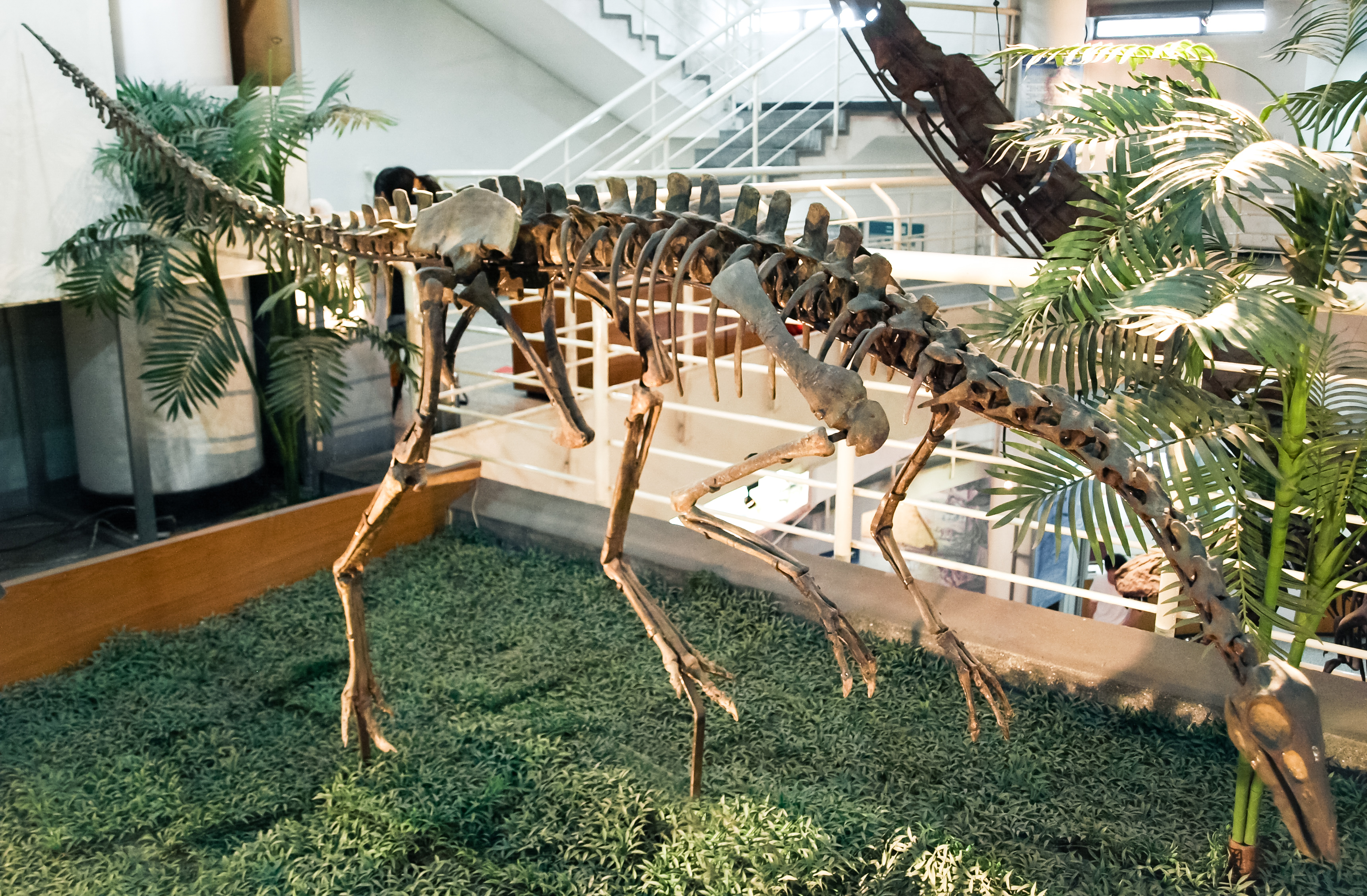
- Archaeornithomimus asiaticus skeleton mounted at the Paleozoological Museum of China

Scientific classification
- Kingdom: Animalia
- Phylum: Chordata
- Class: Reptilia
- Clade: Dinosauria
- Clade: Saurischia
- Clade: Theropoda
- Clade: †Ornithomimosauria
- Family: †Ornithomimidae
- Genus: †Archaeornithomimus; Russell, 1972
- Species: †A. asiaticus

Binomial name
- †Archaeornithomimus asiaticus (Gilmore, 1933) [originally Ornithomimus asiaticus]

= Archaeornithomimus =

Archaeornithomimus Temporal range: Late Cretaceous, ~96 Ma

Extinct genus of dinosaurs

Archaeornithomimus (meaning "ancient bird mimic") is a genus of ornithomimosaurian theropod dinosaur that lived during the Late Cretaceous period (around 96 million years ago) in the Iren Dabasu Formation of Inner Mongolia, China.

== Discovery and naming ==
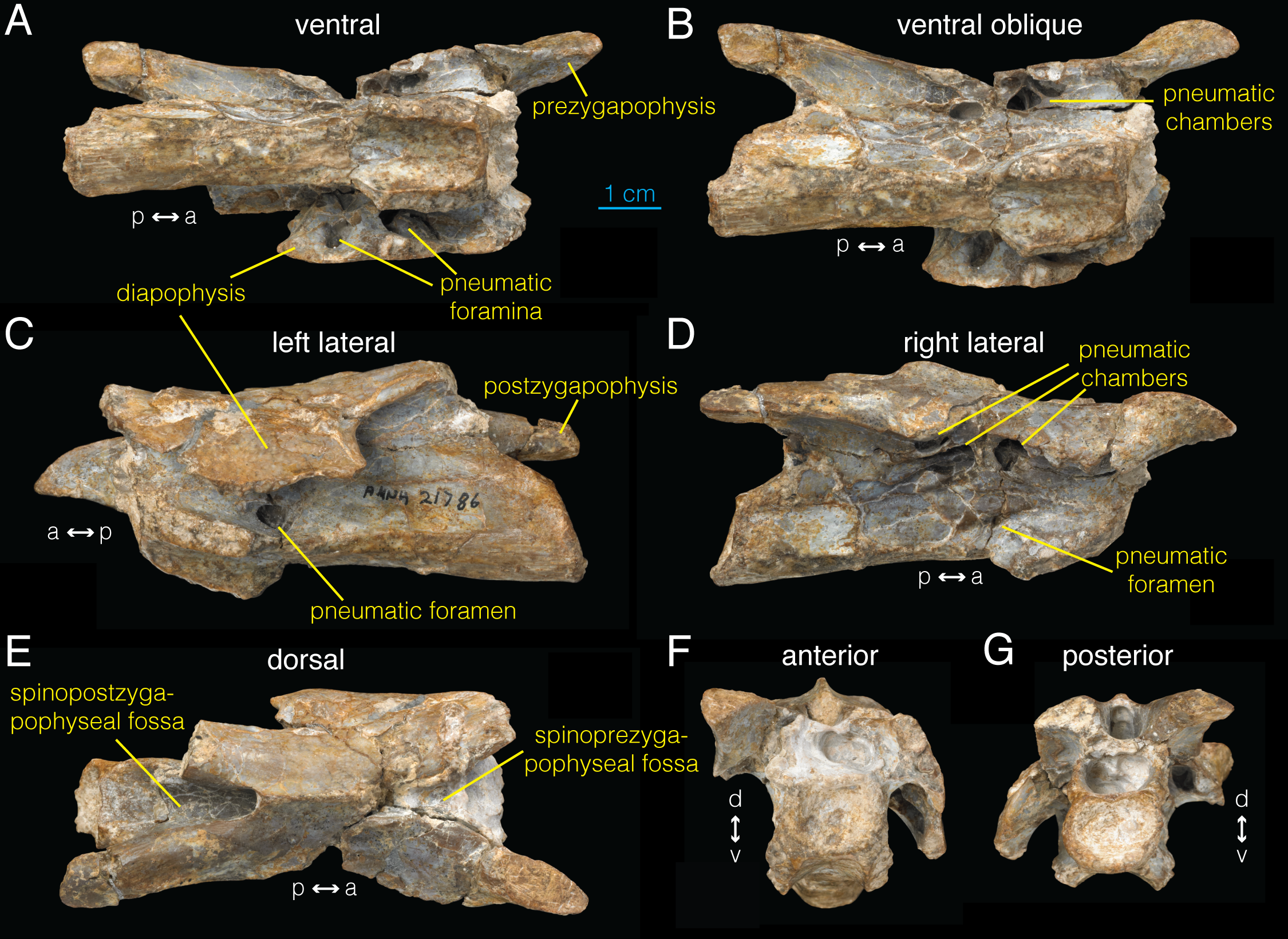
Cervical vertebra (specimen AMNH FARB 21786) in multiple views

In 1923, during the American Museum of Natural History expedition by Roy Chapman Andrews to Inner Mongolia, Peter Kaisen discovered numerous theropod remains in three quarries. They consist of the largely disarticulated remains of several individuals and material of the skull and the lower jaws is lacking. These were named and shortly described by Charles Whitney Gilmore in 1933 as a new species of Ornithomimus: Ornithomimus asiaticus. The specific name refers to the Asian provenance. The species was placed in the new genus Archaeornithomimus by Dale Russell in 1972, making Archaeornithomimus asiaticus the type species of the genus. The generic name combines that of Ornithomimus with a Greek ἀρχαῖος (archaios), "ancient", because Russell believed that the layers in which Archaeornithomimus was found dated to the Cenomanian-Turonian ages, about 95 million years ago, making it one of the oldest ornithomimids known at the time. Gilmore had not assigned a holotype specimen; in 1990, David Smith and Peter Galton in the first comprehensive description of the fossils, choose specimen AMNH 6565, a foot, as the lectotype. The fossils were found in the Iren Dabasu Formation, which has been dated to the Cenomanian age, around 95.8 ± 6.2 million years ago.

=== Formerly assigned species ===
Foot bones found in the Early Cretaceous Arundel Formation of Maryland were referred by Othniel Charles Marsh to Allosaurus medius in 1888. In 1911, Richard Swann Lull named these as a new species of Dryptosaurus: Dryptosaurus grandis. In 1920, Gilmore renamed them to a new species of Ornithomimus. However, because Ornithomimus grandis already existed, he renamed the species Ornithomimus affinis. In 1972, Dale Russell renamed them as a second species of Archaeornithomimus (A. affinis), but other authors considered this taxon a nomen dubium in both editions of The Dinosauria. In 1990, Smith and Galton concluded that the remains were not ornithomimosaurian and came from some other small theropod, while the describers of other ornithomimosaurs (Kinnareemimus, Arkansaurus and Paraxenisaurus) suggested that "O." affinis does belong to an indeterminate ornithomimosaur.

In 1995, Nesov named a new species of ornithomimosaur from the Bissekty Formation (Turonian) of Uzbekistan as Archaeornithomimus bissektensis, based on the holotype N 479/12457, a femur of a juvenile, along with other referred specimens including the metatarsals. However, the affinity of A. bissektensis was generally doubted or not mentioned by subsequent studies. In 2025, Averianov and Sues assigned this taxon to the new genus Dzharacursor.

== Description ==
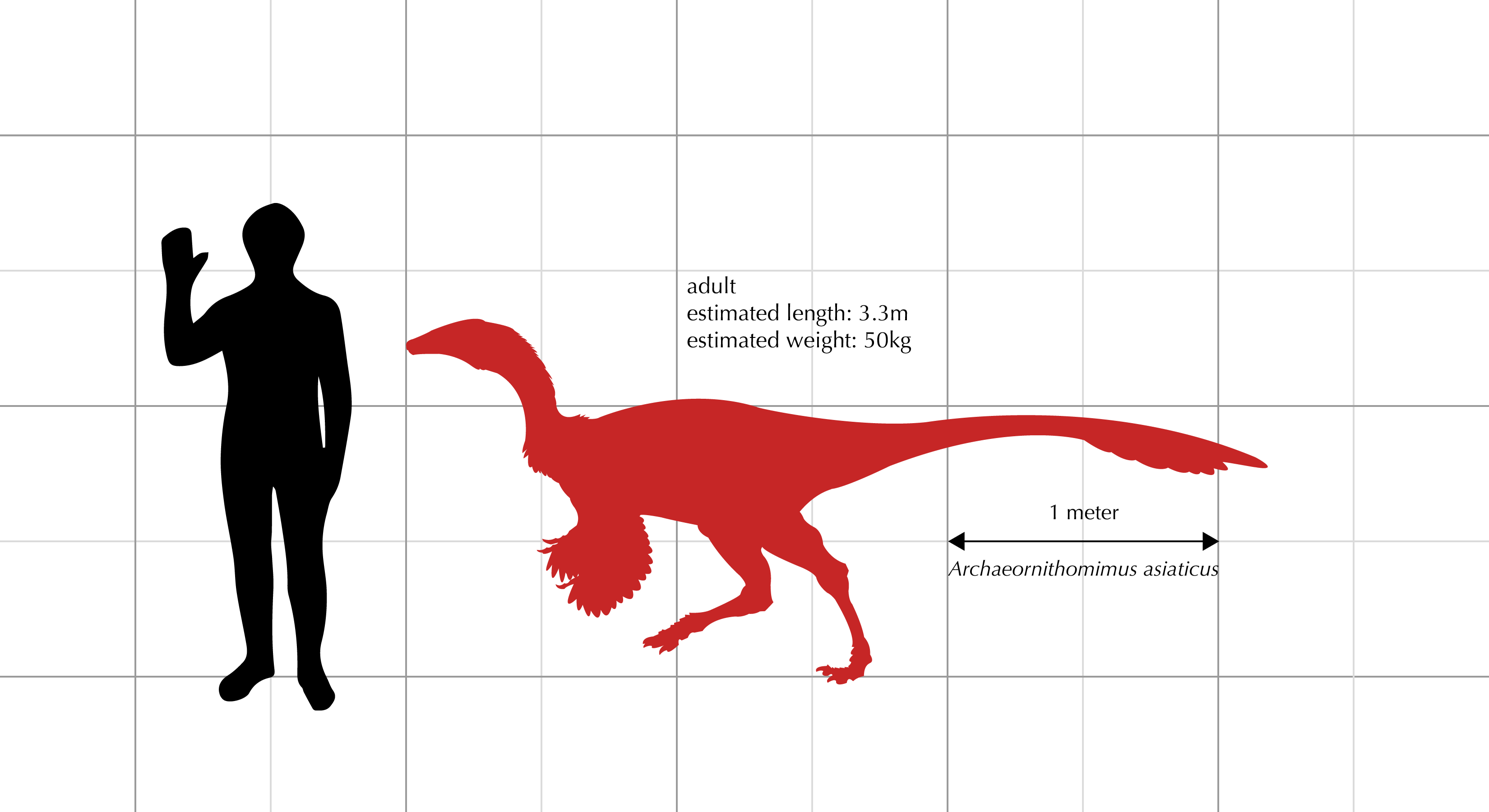
Size comparison with an average human male

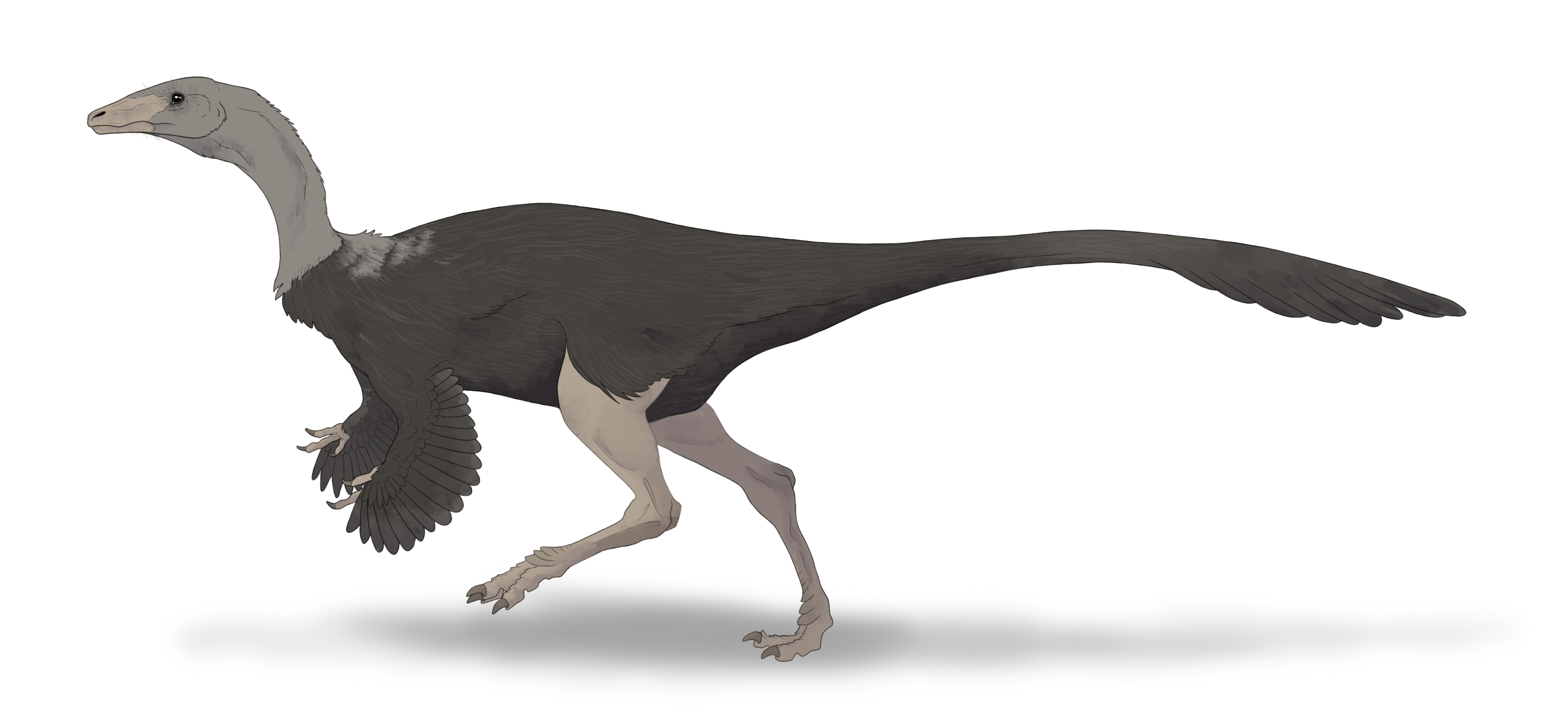
Life restoration

Archaeornithomimus was a medium sized ornithomimosaur, reaching 3.4 m (11 ft) long and weighing over 71.5 kilograms (158 lb). Solid evidence coming from other ornithomimosaurian relatives suggest that Archaeornithomimus was a feathered animal, with very ratite-like feathers and equipped with a keratinous beak.

The hindlimbs were robustly built. The third metatarsal was not pinched at the upper end, so the foot was not arctometatarsalian. The cervical vertebrae are highly pneumatized with very complex internal chambers across the neural arches and the centrum (body of the vertebra), indicating the presence of cervical air sacs. The anterior dorsal and some caudal vertebrae features some degree of pneumacity; however, the sacral vertebrae are apneumatic. In a 2001 study conducted by Bruce Rothschild and other paleontologists, 229 foot bones referred to Archaeornithomimus were examined for signs of stress fracture, but none were found.

== Classification ==
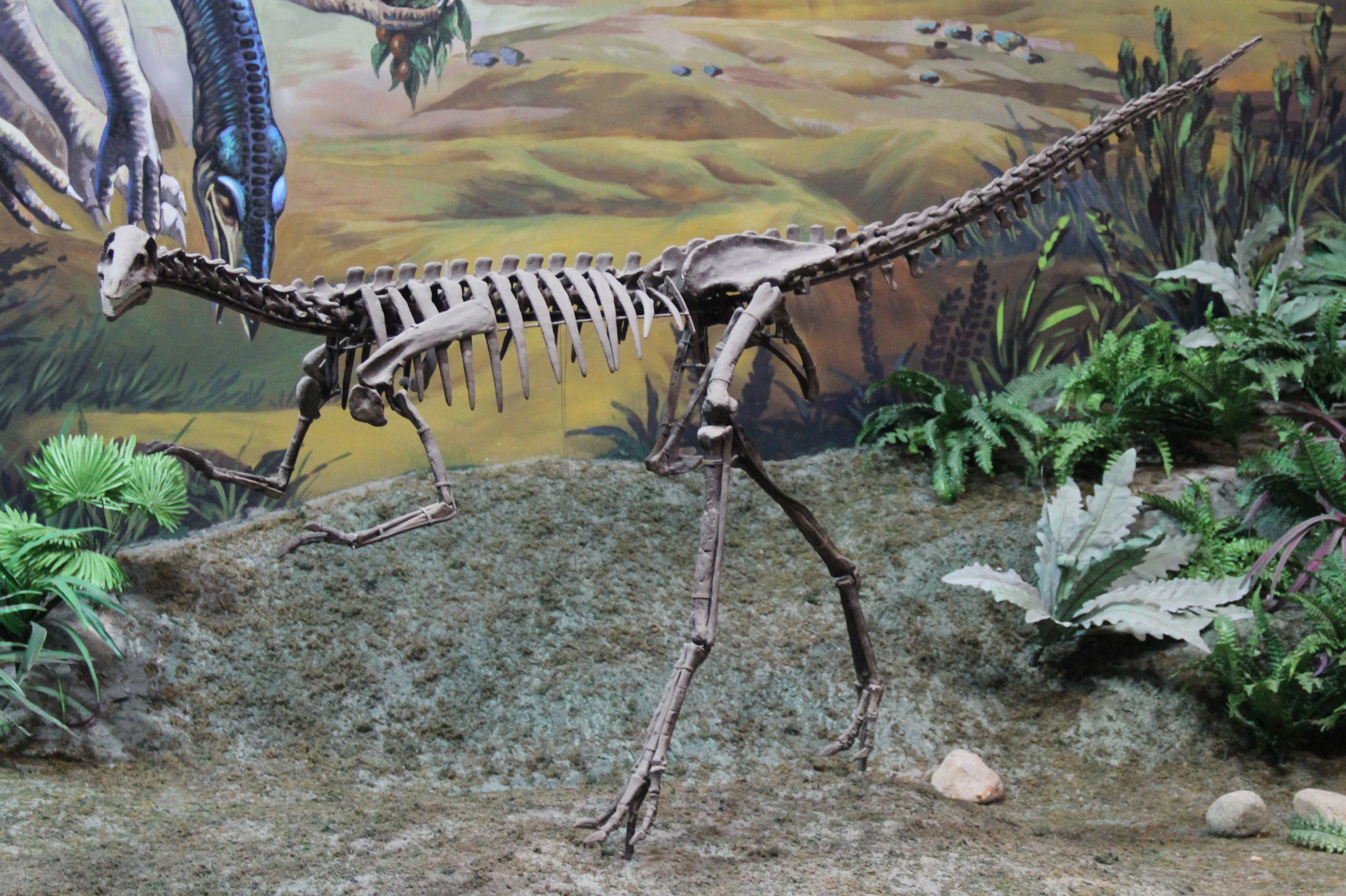
Skeletal mount in the Inner Mongolia Museum

Russell assigned Archaeornithomimus to the Ornithomimidae. Recent cladistic analyses either confirm this or recover the species outside of the Ornithomimidae, basal in the Ornithomimosauria. During the description of Hesperornithoides, an extensive Coelurosauria phylogenetic analysis (also known as the Lori matrix) was conducted in order to determine the position of this paravian. Here, Archaeornithomimus was recovered within the Garudimimidae being a relative of Arkansaurus:

- Ornithomimosauria
  - - Hexing
    - Deinocheirus
  - - Shenzhousaurus
    - - - Angeac taxon
        - Nedcolbertia
      - - Ornithomimidae
          - Aepyornithomimus
          - - Sinornithomimus
            - Ornithomimus
      - - Garudimimidae
          - Arkansaurus
          - - Archaeornithomimus
            - - GIN 960910KD
              - - Beishanlong
                - Garudimimus
      - - Harpymimus
        - - - Gallimimus "mongoliensis"
            - Tototlmimus
          - - - MNAP 11762A
              - - Rativates
                - Ornithomimus sedens
            - - - Anserimimus
                - - Qiupalong
                  - Dromiceiomimus
              - - Struthiomimus
                - - Timimus
                  - Gallimimus

== Paleoecology ==
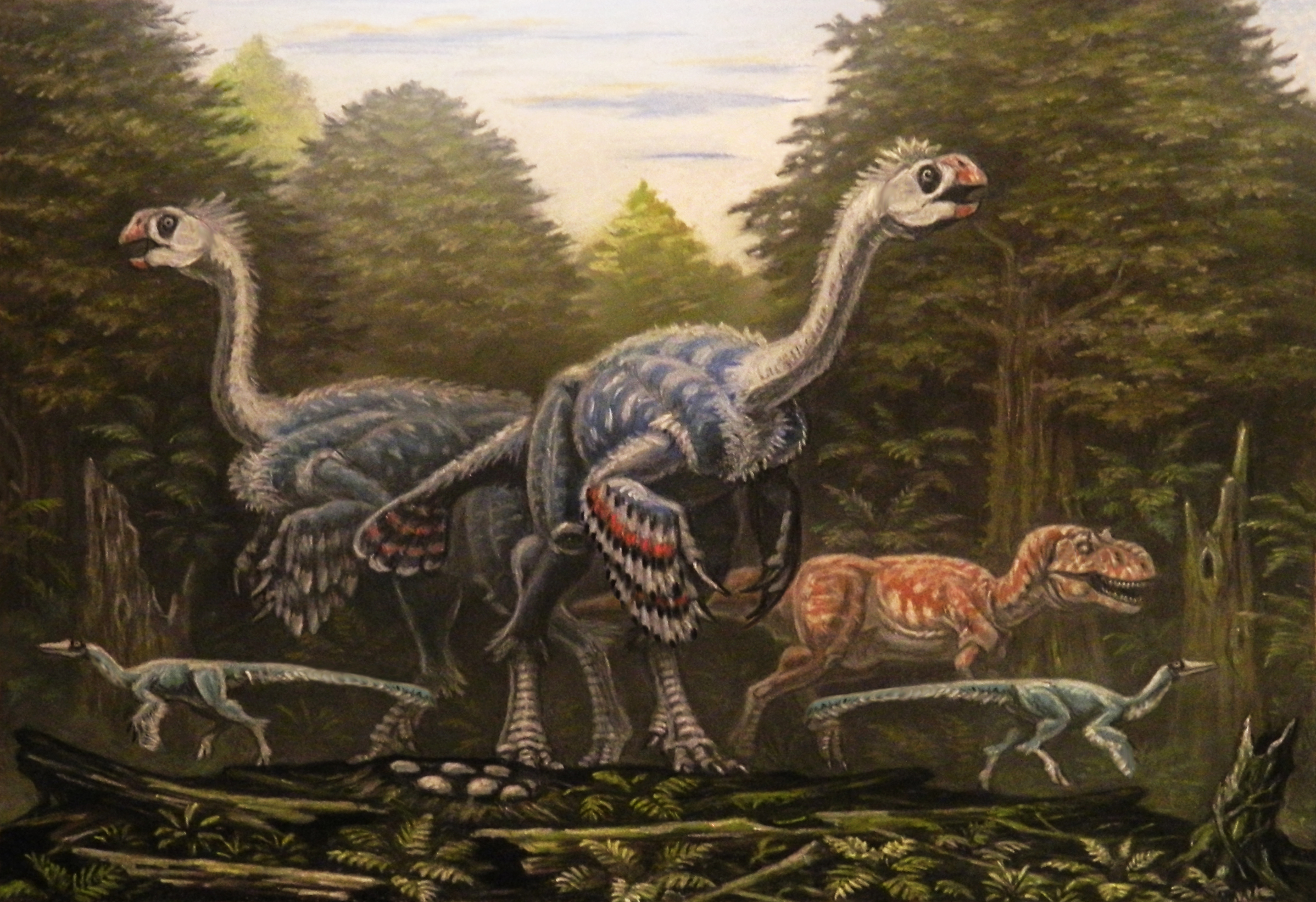
Restoration of a pair of Gigantoraptor protecting their nest from two Archaeornithomimus and an Alectrosaurus

The remains of Archaeornithomimus were found in the Iren Dabasu Formation, which dates back to the Cenomanian stage about 96 million years ago during the Late Cretaceous period. The environments present on the formation were mainly large floodplain terrains with braided rivers and meanders that were connected to the ocean, supporting extensive vegetation as seen on the palaeosol development and the numerous remains from herbivorous dinosaurs such as hadrosauroids.

Like other members of the Ornithomimosauria, Archaeornithomimus was likely an omnivore equipped with a horny beak, eating everything from small mammals, to plants and fruit, to eggs, and even hatchlings of other Asian dinosaurs.

Other dinosaurs that co-existed with Archaeornithomimus in the formation included other theropods, such as Alectrosaurus, Erliansaurus, Gigantoraptor and Neimongosaurus. Herbivorous dinosaurs were represented by Bactrosaurus, Gilmoreosaurus and Sonidosaurus.

== See also ==
- Timeline of ornithomimosaur research
- Glossary of dinosaur anatomy
