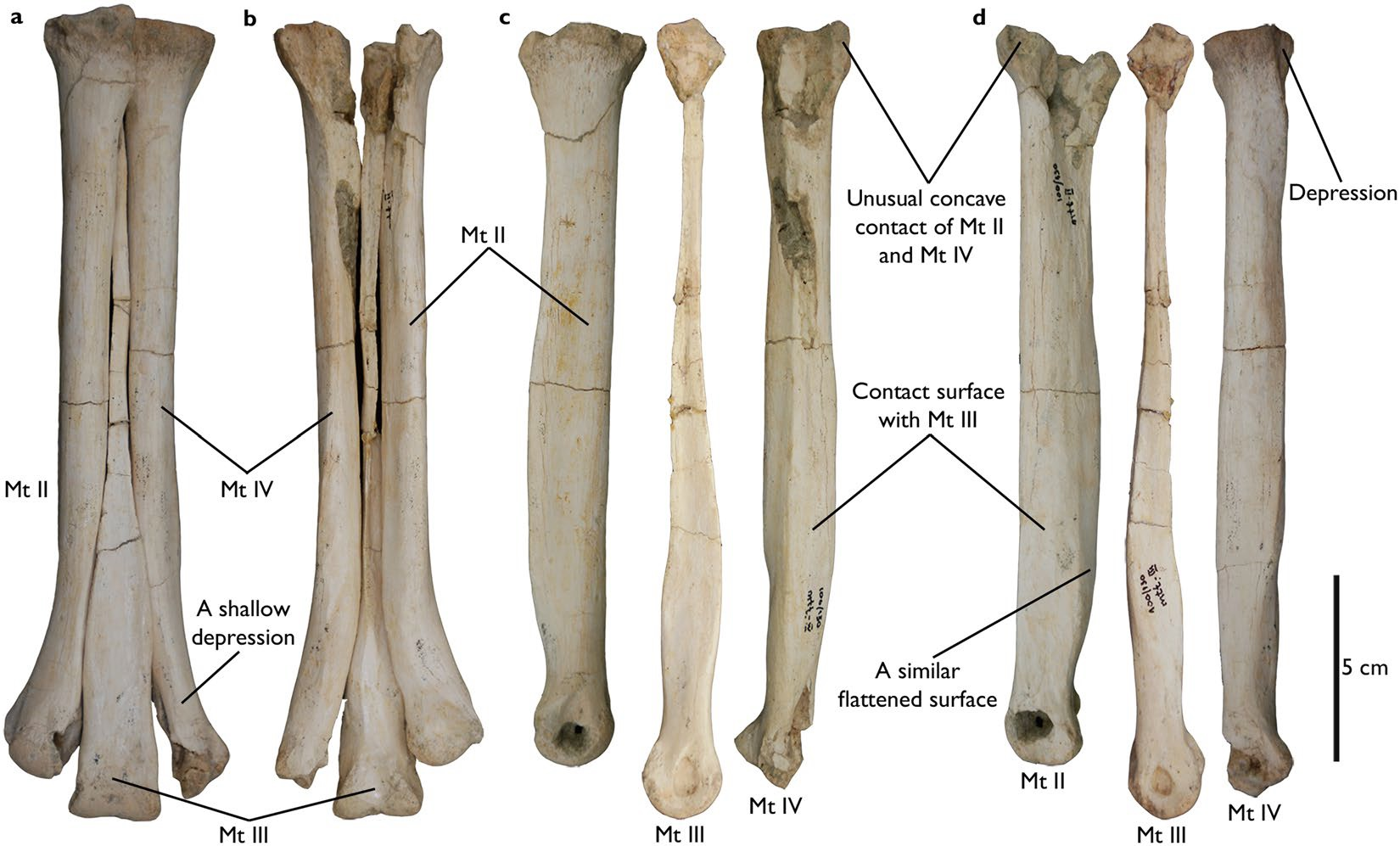
- Metatarsals of MPC-D 100/130

Scientific classification
- Kingdom: Animalia
- Phylum: Chordata
- Class: Reptilia
- Clade: Dinosauria
- Clade: Saurischia
- Clade: Theropoda
- Clade: †Ornithomimosauria
- Family: †Ornithomimidae
- Genus: †Aepyornithomimus; Chinzorig et al., 2017

Type species
- †Aepyornithomimus tugrikinensis Chinzorig et al., 2017

= Aepyornithomimus =

Aepyornithomimus Temporal range: Late Cretaceous, ~Campanian

Extinct genus of dinosaurs

Aepyornithomimus (meaning "Aepyornis mimic") is a genus of ornithomimid theropod dinosaur from the Late Cretaceous Djadochta Formation of Mongolia. It lived in the Campanian, around 75 million years ago, when the area is thought to have been a desert. The type and only species is A. tugrikinensis.

== History of discovery ==
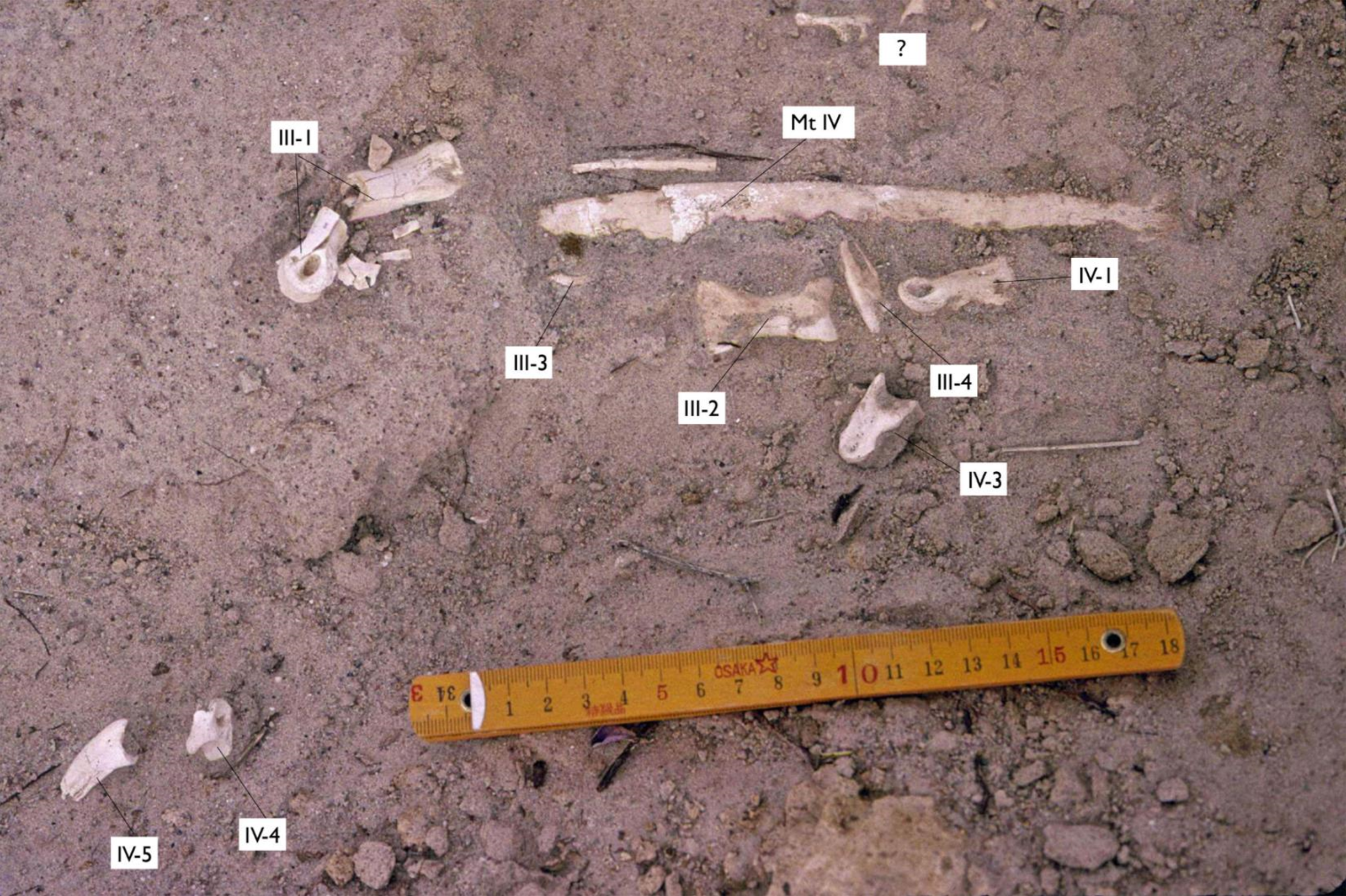
MPC-D 100/130 being excavated

The holotype specimen, MPC-D 100/130, was discovered in sediments at the Tögrögiin Shiree locality of the Djadokhta Formation, a locality that is interpreted to be composed of semi-arid eolian sediments with irregular, light gray and cross-bedded sands and sandstones, by Shigeru Suzuki during a joint Japanese (HMNS)—Mongolian (IPG) paleontological expedition to the Gobi Desert in 1994. The specimen consists of an almost complete articulated left pes preserved with partial astragalus, complete calcaneum, and the lower tarsal III; it is now housed at the Institute of Paleontology and Geology of the Mongolian Academy of Sciences. MPC-D 100/130 was formally described in 2017 by paleontologists Tsogtbaatar Chinzorig, Yoshitsugu Kobayashi, Khishigjav Tsogtbaatar, Philip J. Currie, Mahito Watabe and Rinchen Barsbold, giving name to the new ornithomimid taxon Aepyornithomimus tugrikinensis. The generic name, Aepyornithomimus, is derived from the large ratites Aepyornis and the Latin mimus (meaning mimic), in reference to the similar foot structure. Lastly, tugrikinensis refers to the locality of provenance, Tögrögiin Shiree.

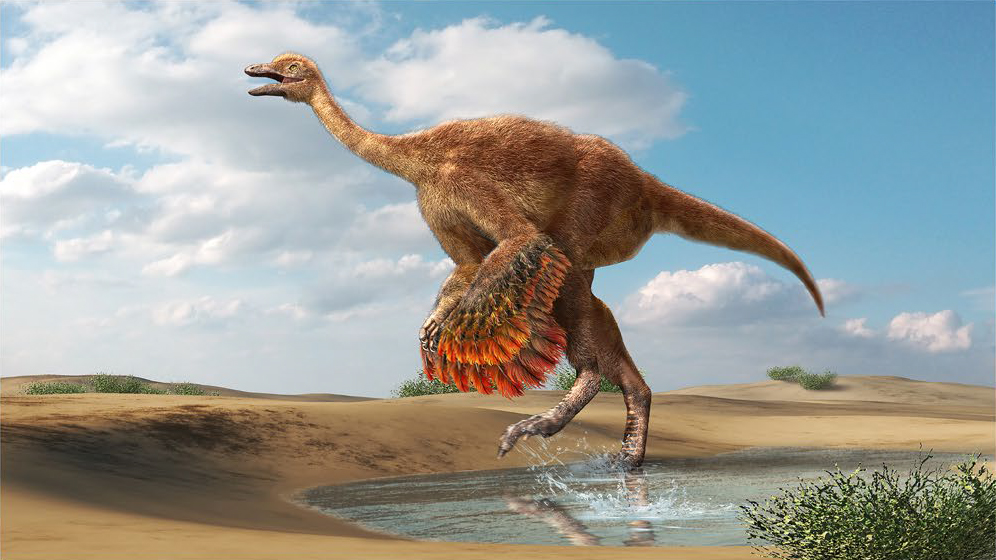
Artistic restoration

== Classification ==
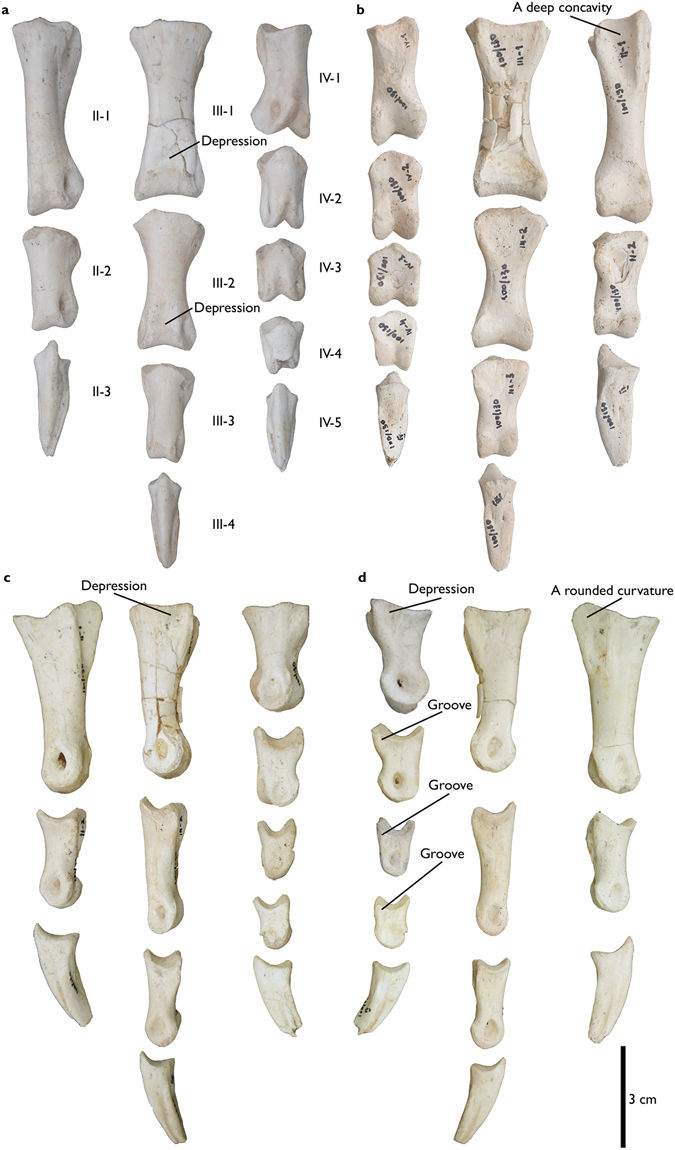
Phalange bones

In a phylogenetic analysis, Aepyornithomimus was found to be a derived ornithomimosaur, closely related to Struthiomimus, Ornithomimus, Gallimimus, and Anserimimus. The exact systematics within this group of derived ornithomimids could not be resolved, but they were found to be closely related to the Deinocheiridae and Archaeornithomimus (which grouped with an unnamed taxon from the Bissekty Formation). Morphologically, observations were made that it seemed transitional between the metatarsal condition in basal ornithomimosaurs and more derived ones, and it was suggested that A. tugikinensis shows an intermediate condition.

== Paleoecology ==
The Djadokhta Formation where Aepyornithomimus was found was an arid eolian desert similar to the modern Gobi Desert. Later in the Campanian age and into the Maastrichtian the climate would shift to the more humid fluvial environment seen in the Nemegt Formation. A. tugrikinensis is the first diagnostic ornithomimosaur found in these earlier, drier deposits, and indicates the group could tolerate a variety of environmental conditions.

== See also ==
- Timeline of ornithomimosaur research
