= Tototlmimus =

Tototlmimus Temporal range: Campanian ~72 Ma

Scientific classification
- Kingdom: Animalia
- Phylum: Chordata
- Class: Reptilia
- Clade: Dinosauria
- Clade: Saurischia
- Clade: Theropoda
- Clade: †Ornithomimosauria
- Family: †Ornithomimidae
- Genus: †Tototlmimus; Serrano-Brañas et al., 2016

Type species
- †Tototlmimus packardensis Serrano-Brañas et al., 2016

Extinct genus of dinosaurs

Tototlmimus is an extinct genus of ornithomimid theropod dinosaur from the Late Cretaceous (Campanian) Packard Formation of Sonora, Mexico. Its type species is Tototlmimus packardensis, representing the first ornithomimosaur formally described from this country.

== Discovery ==
The only known species, the type species Tototlmimus packardensis, was formally described in October 2015 by Claudia Inés Serrano-Brañas, Esperanza Torres-Rodríguez, Paola Carolina Reyes-Luna, Ixchel González-Ramírez and Carlos González-León; because the online publication was not registered in ZooBank, the name was only validly published when the paper was printed in March 2016. The genus name is derived from the Nahuatl word tototl, 'bird', and the Latin mimus, 'mimic' (from Greek μῖμος). The specific name refers to its origin from the Packard Formation.

The fossil specimen, holotype ERNO 8553, was found in the northeastern Mexican state of Sonora, in the Cabullona Group, in a bed of the Packard Shale which may date from the late Campanian, 72 million years ago. It consists of a partial skeleton without skull. This includes the first phalanx of the first finger of the left hand, the first and second phalanx of the third right finger, the lower ends of the second, third and fourth metatarsals, the first and second phalanx of the second toe, the second and third phalanges of the third toe, the first, third and fourth phalanx of the fourth toe, the first and second phalanx of the left second toe, and a claw of the left foot. These fossil elements, none of which are complete, were found disarticulated in an area of fifty centimeters square.

== Description ==
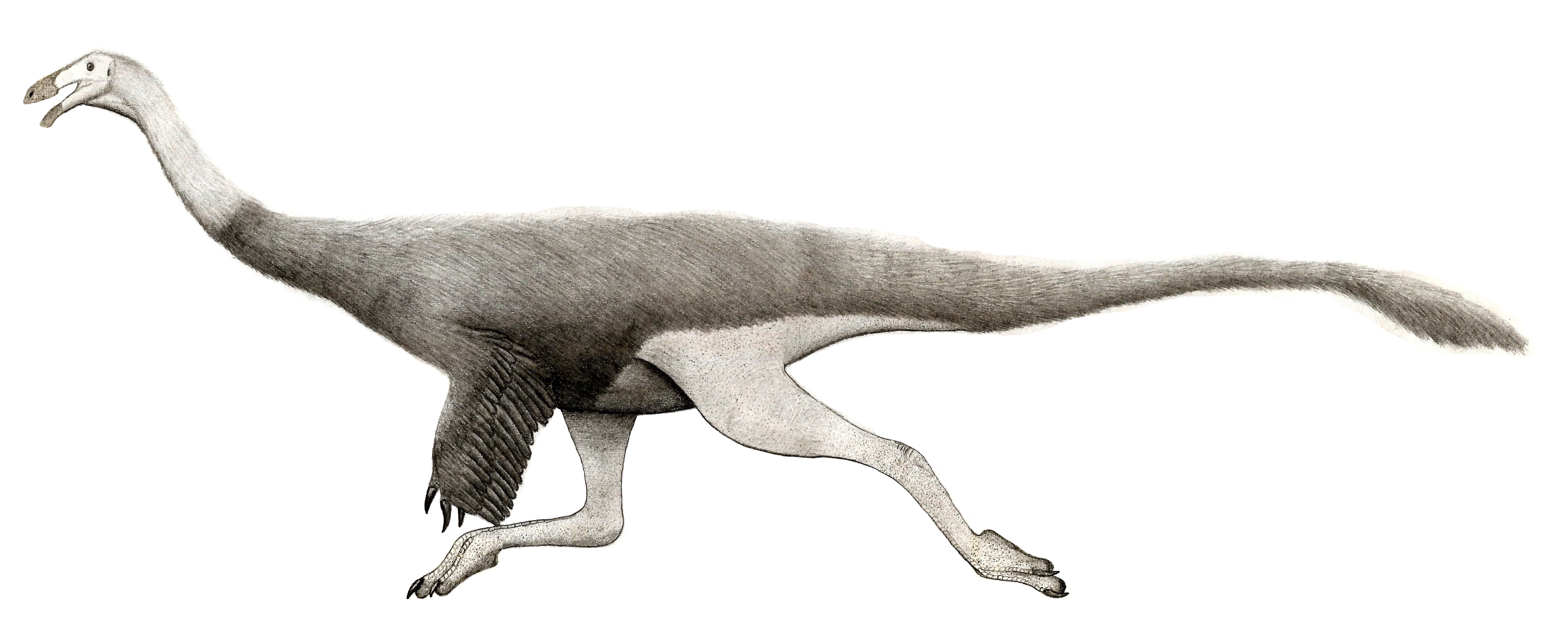
Speculative life restoration of a possible close relative, the informally named "Saltillomimus", based partly on Tototlmimus

Tototlmimus is a medium-sized ornithomimid. The descriptors could identify five distinguishing characteristics. The lower ends of the second and fourth metatarsals do not diverge but are appressed to the lower side surfaces of the third metatarsal. This contact is made possible because the inside of the third metatarsal fits perfectly with the sides of the second and fourth metatarsals. The third metatarsal has an only weakly developed ginglymoid inferior articular surface. The unguals, the bones of the foot claws, are narrow and asymmetric with shallow grooves on both sides. The foot claws have only a shallow a longitudinal groove for the flexor tendon, but a deep groove in the lower inner side near the surface of the articulation.

Tototlmimus shows a foot with a typical build for ornithomimosaurs. The midfoot is an arctometatarsus, with a third metatarsal that becomes narrower at the top. The foot claws have a triangular joint surface with a relatively straight bottom edge. The rear edge forms a "heel" with in front of it a transverse groove.

== Phylogeny ==
Tototlmimus was placed in the Ornithomimidae, in a derived position. It is the first ornithomimid named from Mexico and one of the southernmost known in North America. According to a cladistic analysis in the scientific description, it was the sister genus of Ornithomimus.

Cladogram based on the analysis by Serrano-Brañas et al., 2015:

- Ornithomimidae
  - Archaeornithomimus
  - - Sinornithomimus
    - - - Gallimimus
        - Anserimimus
      - - Struthiomimus
        - - Tototlmimus
          - Ornithomimus

== See also ==
- Timeline of ornithomimosaur research
- 2016 in paleontology
