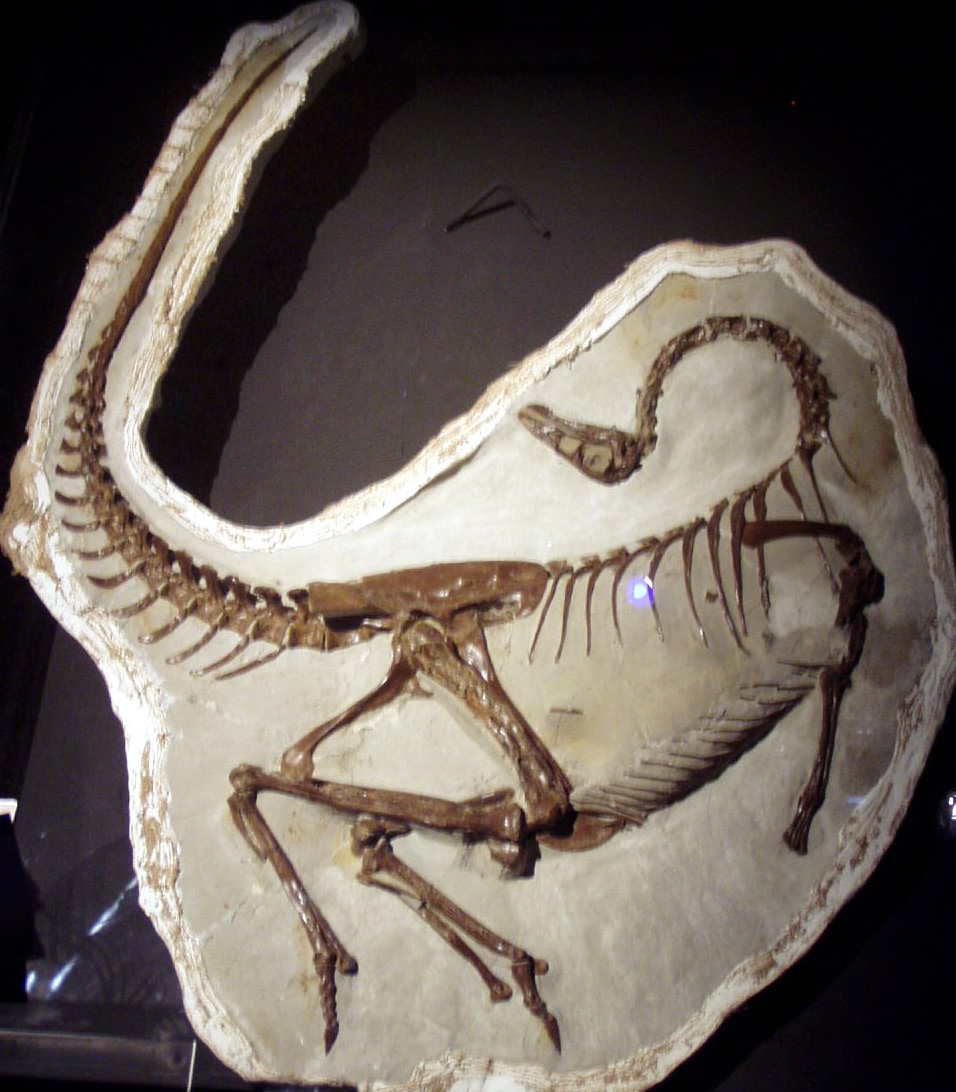
- Ornithomimus specimen found in 1995 with quill knobs, Royal Tyrrell Museum.

Scientific classification
- Kingdom: Animalia
- Phylum: Chordata
- Class: Reptilia
- Clade: Dinosauria
- Clade: Saurischia
- Clade: Theropoda
- Clade: †Ornithomimosauria
- Superfamily: †Ornithomimoidea
- Family: †Ornithomimidae; Marsh, 1890

Type species
- †Ornithomimus velox Marsh, 1890

Subgroups
- †Aepyornithomimus; †Anserimimus; †Archaeornithomimus; †"Coelosaurus"; †Dromiceiomimus; †Dzharacursor; †Gallimimus; †Mexidracon; †Ornithomimus; †Qiupalong; †Rativates; †Sinornithomimus; †Struthiomimus; †Tototlmimus

Synonyms
- Struthiomimidae Ostrom, 1972

= Ornithomimidae =

Ornithomimids Temporal range: Late Cretaceous, 96–66 Ma

Group of theropod dinosaurs

Ornithomimidae is a family of theropod dinosaurs which bore a superficial resemblance to modern ostriches. Ornithomimids were cursorial, omnivorous or herbivorous dinosaurs known mainly from the Late Cretaceous Period of Laurasia (now Asia and North America), though they have also been reported from the Lower Cretaceous Wonthaggi Formation of Australia.

== Description ==
The skulls of ornithomimids were small, with large eyes, above relatively long and slender necks. All had toothless beaks.

The fore limbs ('arms') were long and slender and bore powerful claws. The hind limbs were long and powerful, with a long foot and short, strong toes terminating in hooflike claws. Ornithomimids were probably among the fastest of all dinosaurs. Like many other coelurosaurs, the ornithomimid hide was feathered rather than scaly.

== Biology ==
Comparisons between the scleral rings of the genus Ornithomimus and modern birds and reptiles indicate that they may have been cathemeral, active throughout the day at short intervals.

While little is known of ornithomimid reproduction, neonate ornithomimid fossils have been found representing either embryos or hatchlings.

Ornithomimids appear to have been preyed upon at least occasionally by other theropods, as evidenced by an ornithomimid tail vertebra that preserves tooth drag marks attributed to a dromaeosaurid (Saurornitholestes). One specimen from an unidentified ornithomimid shows a pathologic toe bone whose far end is "mushroomed" compared to those of healthy specimens.

=== Diet ===
Ornithomimids probably acquired most of their calories from plants. Many ornithomimosaurs, including primitive species, have been found with numerous gastroliths in their stomachs, characteristic of herbivores. Henry Fairfield Osborn suggested that the long, sloth-like 'arms' of ornithomimids may have been used to pull down branches on which to feed, an idea supported by further study of their strange, hook-like hands. The sheer abundance of ornithomimids — they are the most common small dinosaurs in North America — is consistent with the idea that they were plant eaters, as herbivores usually outnumber carnivores in an ecosystem. However, they may have been omnivores that ate both plants and small animal prey.

The feeding habits of ornithomimids have been controversial. In 2001 Norell et al. reported a specimen of Gallimimus (IGM 100/1133) and one of Ornithomimus (RTMP 95.110.1). These two fossil skulls had soft tissue preservation, and both had keratinous beaks with vertical grooves extending ventrally from the bony upper mandible. These structures are reminiscent of the lamellae seen in ducks, in which they function to strain small edible items like plants, forams, mollusks, and ostracods from the water. The authors further noted that ornithomimids were abundant in mesic environments, and rarer in more arid environments, suggesting that they may have depended on waterborne sources of food, possibly filter feeding. They noted that primitive ornithomimids had well developed teeth, while derived forms were toothless and probably could not feed on large animals.

One later paper questioned the conclusions of Norell et al. Barrett (2005) noted that vertical ridges are seen on the inner surface of the beaks of strictly herbivorous turtles, and also the hadrosaurid Edmontosaurus. Barrett also offered calculations, estimating how much energy could be derived from filter feeding and the probable energy needs of an animal as big as Gallimimus. He concluded that omnivory was more likely.

== Classification ==
Named by O.C. Marsh in 1890, the family Ornithomimidae was originally classified as a group of ornithopods. Two years later, Marsh described additional material and realized that ornithomimids were theropods. As relationships within theropods began to be resolved in the 20th century, Friedrich von Huene included Ornithomimidae in his infraorder Coelurosauria. Recognizing the distinctiveness of ornithomimids compared to other coelurosaurs, Rinchen Barsbold placed ornithomimids within their own infraorder, Ornithomimosauria, in 1976. Today, Ornithomimosauria is regarded as a clade within Coelurosauria. The contents of Ornithomimidae and Ornithomimosauria varied from author to author as cladistic definitions began to appear for the groups in the 1990s and 2000s.

The cladogram below was the result of a study conducted in 2015 by Claudia Serrano-Branas and colleagues.

- Ornithomimidae
  - Archaeornithomimus asiaticus
  - unnamed
    - Sinornithomimus dongi
    - unnamed
      - - Anserimimus planinychus
        - Gallimimus
      - unnamed
        - Struthiomimus
        - unnamed
          - Tototlmimus packardensis
          - Ornithomimus

== See also ==
- Timeline of ornithomimosaur research
