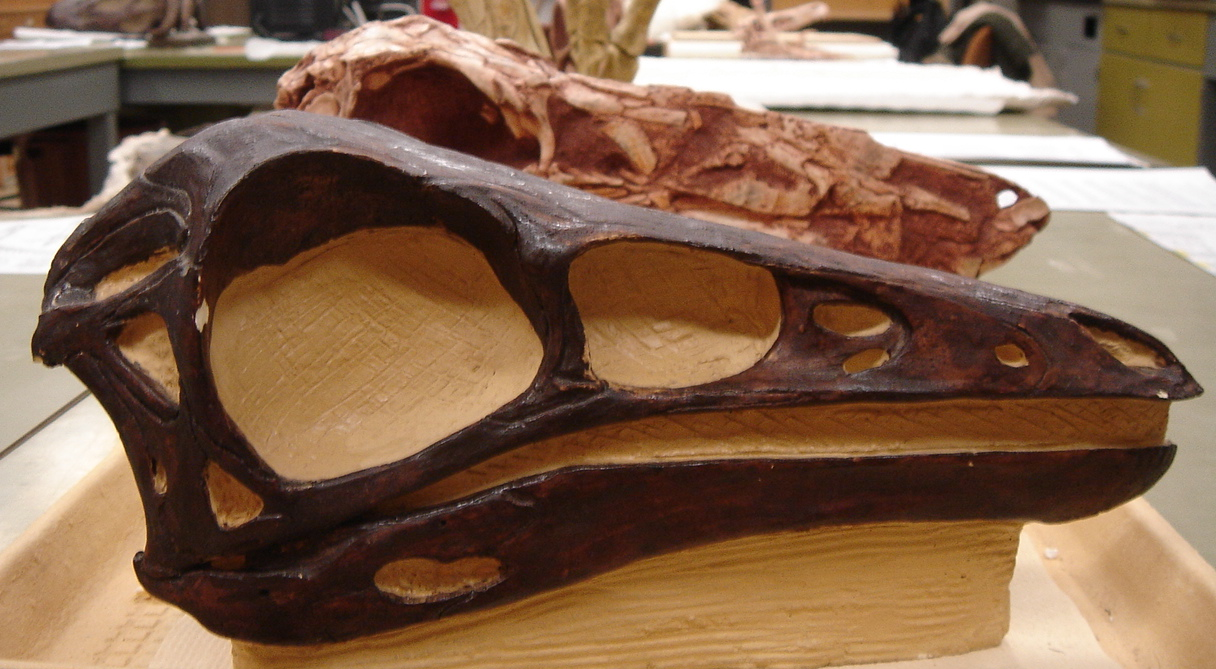
- Skull cast

Scientific classification
- Kingdom: Animalia
- Phylum: Chordata
- Class: Reptilia
- Clade: Dinosauria
- Clade: Saurischia
- Clade: Theropoda
- Clade: †Ornithomimosauria
- Family: †Ornithomimidae
- Genus: †Dromiceiomimus; Russell, 1972
- Species: †D. brevitertius

Binomial name
- †Dromiceiomimus brevitertius (Parks, 1926) Russell, 1972

Synonyms
- Struthiomimus brevitertius Parks, 1926

= Dromiceiomimus =

Dromiceiomimus Temporal range: Late Cretaceous, 73.5–68.5 Ma

Extinct genus of reptiles

Dromiceiomimus is a genus of ornithomimid theropod from the Late Cretaceous (early Maastrichtian) of Alberta, Canada. The type species, D. brevitertius, is considered a synonym of Ornithomimus edmontonicus by some authors, while others consider it a distinct and valid taxon. It was a small ornithomimid that weighed about 135 kilograms (298 lb).

== Taxonomy ==
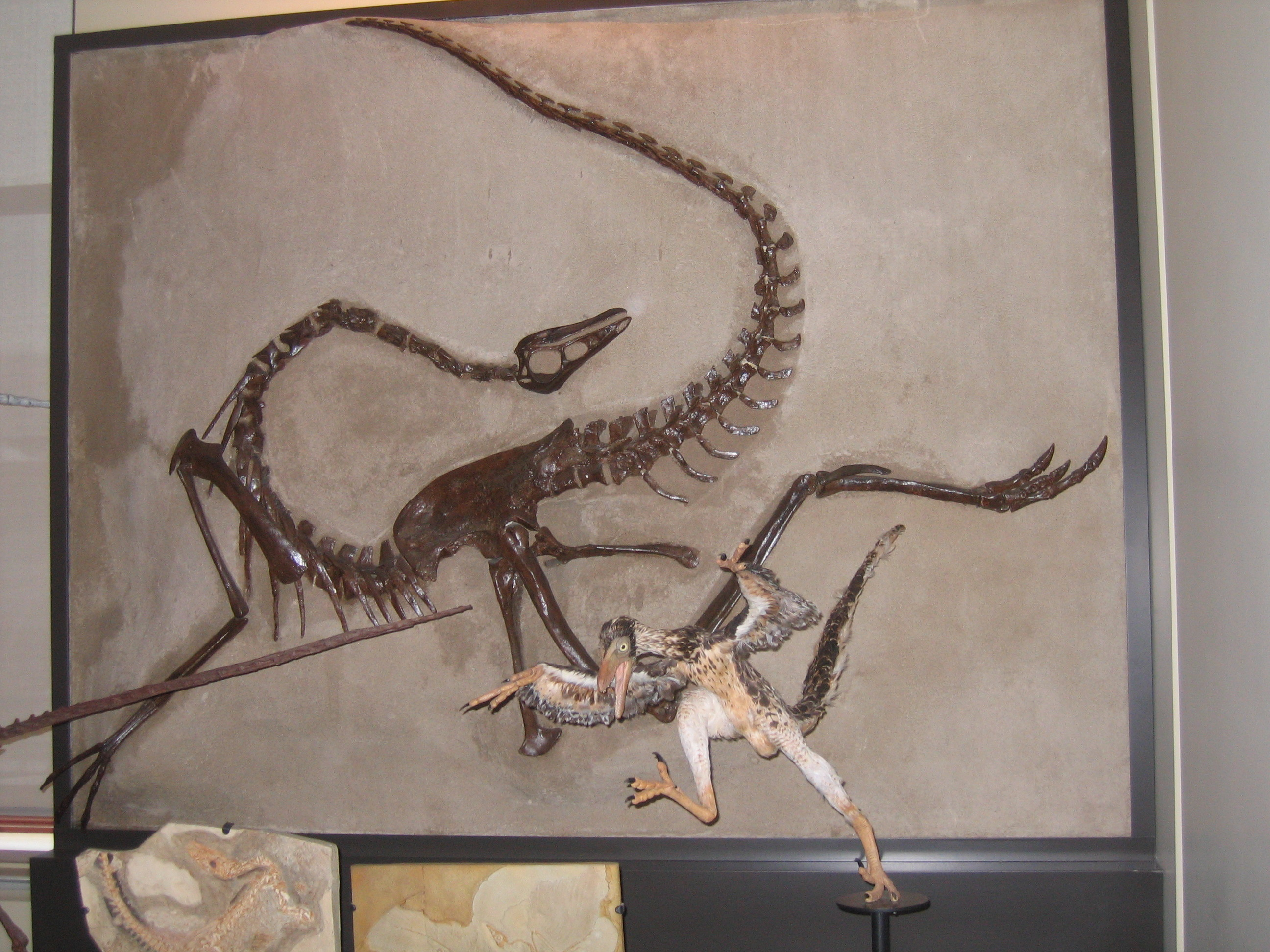
Skeleton at Canadian Museum of Nature

Size comparison of UALVP 16182

The type species, D. brevitertius was originally described as a species of Struthiomimus by William Parks in 1926 on the basis of a partial postcranium, ROM 797, from the Horseshoe Canyon Formation of Alberta, Canada.

In his review of Canadian ornithomimids, Dale Russell made S. brevitertius the type species of a new genus, Dromiceiomimus, meaning "emu mimic" from the old generic name for the emu, Dromiceius. Russell also synonymized Struthiomimus ingens with Dromiceimimus brevitertius. He renamed Ornithomimus samueli into a second Dromiceiomimus species: Dromiceiomimus samueli. Dromiceiomimus was distinguished from Ornithomimus edmontonicus on the basis of the following characters: humerus shorter than scapula; ulna ~70% of femoral length; preacetabular process, tibia, metatarsus and pedal digit III longer compared to femur.

In a 1981 publication, however, Nicholls and Russell cast doubt on the validity of Dromiceiomimus and though keeping it distinct from Ornithomimus argued that the limb proportions might be insufficient to distinguish ornithomimid taxa from each other. In the second edition of the Dinosauria, Makovicky et al. claimed that there is no statistical support for the distinction of Dromiceiomimus from Ornithomimus, and synonymized it with Ornithomimus edmontonicus Sternberg 1933.

However, a few authors continued to treat Dromiceiomimus as valid, and Longrich (2008, 2014) treated ROM 840 (holotype of Struthiomimus samueli) as a distinct species of ornithomimid related to Ornithomimus.

In 2018, Ian McDonald and Philip John Currie rejected the conclusions by Makovicky and colleagues. They showed that the thighbone/shinbone ratio of specimen UALVP 16182, found in 1967 by Richard Fox and referred to Dromiceiomimus, differed significantly from that of Ornithomimus edmontonicus. They also pointed out that if both species were to be considered synonymous nevertheless, the specific name brevitertius would have priority.
