= Dale Russell =

American-Canadian geologist and palaeontologist (1937–2019)

- Born: December 27, 1937; San Francisco, California, U.S.
- Died: December 21, 2019 (aged 81)
- Citizenship: United States and Canada
- Occupation: Professor
- Employer: North Carolina State University

Dale Alan Russell (27 December 1937 – 21 December 2019) was an American-Canadian geologist and palaeontologist. Throughout his career Russell worked as the Curator of Fossil Vertebrates at the Canadian Museum of Nature, Research Professor at the Department of Marine Earth and Atmospheric Sciences (MEAS) at North Carolina State University, and Senior Paleontologist at the North Carolina Museum of Natural Sciences. Dinosaurs he has described include Daspletosaurus and Dromiceiomimus, and he was amongst the first paleontologists to consider an extraterrestrial cause (supernova, comet, asteroid) for the Cretaceous–Paleogene extinction event. Russell also helped lead the China-Canada Dinosaur Project from 1986 to 1991.

In 1982, Russell created the "dinosauroid" thought experiment, which speculated an evolutionary path for Stenonychosaurus if it had not gone extinct in the Cretaceous–Paleogene extinction event 66 million years ago, and had instead evolved into an intelligent being. Russell commissioned a model of his dinosauroid by artist Ron Séguin, and the concept became popular. Various later anthropologists have continued Russell's speculations about intelligent Troodon-like dinosaurs, though they often find his original idea too anthropomorphic.
