= Ewa Roniewicz =

Polish paleontologist

Ewa Wanda Roniewicz
- Scientific career
- Fields: Paleontology
- Institutions: Institute of Paleobiology, Warsaw, Poland

Ewa Roniewicz is a Polish palaeontologist, known for her work on Mesozoic and Palaeozoic corals and for co-authoring the 1970 description of Deinocheirus mirificus. Her research contributed to a better understanding of coral reefs during the Triassic and Jurassic periods.

== Career ==
Ewa Roniewicz started her academic career in 1964 after receiving a scholarship from the Muséum National d'Histoire Naturelle. By 1968 she had moved on to a master's degree, her graduation date was 1968. From 1972 to 1991 Dr. Roniewicz was employed as an editorial secretary at Acta Palaeontologica Polonica while simultaneously contributing to various research projects. During this time she also received her doctoral degree at Warsaw in 1979. Starting in 1994 Dr. Roniewicz worked as a guest-editor of the Acta Palaeontologica Polonica, this continued until 2006. In 1995 she received her PhD and Doctoral Habilitatus in geology. In 1998 she received grants to co-author several publications, this work continued until 2007. Finally in 2009 she was nominated as professor of palaeontology in the Polish Academy of Sciences. During her career she won the Awards of the Division of Biological Sciences, Polish Academy of Sciences on multiple occasions, 1978, 1984, 1989.

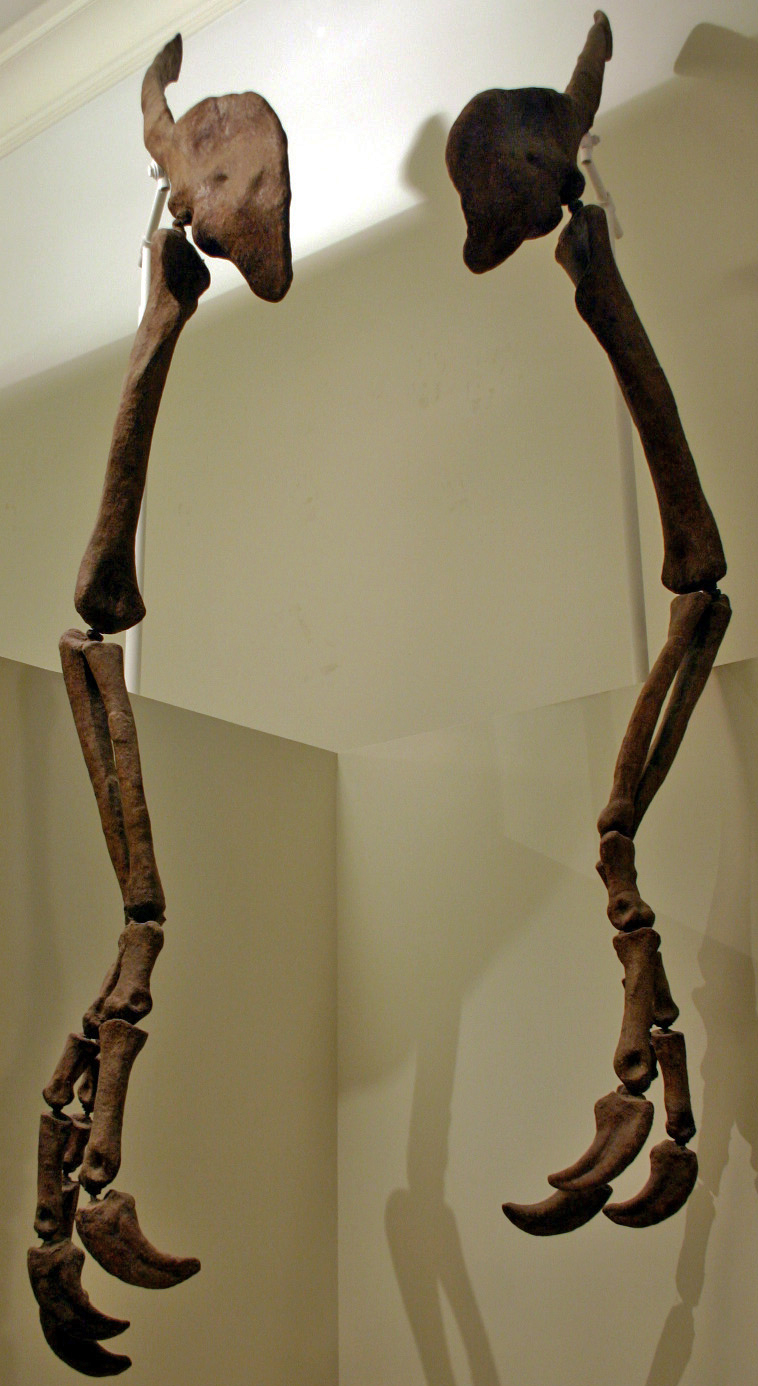
The long-armed Deinocheirus is classified under a new family, Deinocheiridae, within the infraorder Carnosauria and superfamily Megalosauroidea.

== Scientific contributions ==
In 1970, fossils that were discovered by Zofia Kielan-Jaworowska were finally named by Ewa Roniewicz and Halszka Osmólska. They named the long armed dinosaur Deinocheirus mirificus because of the size of its arms. The fossil was found in the Gobi desert, and was significant because no bipedal dinosaur at this time was known to have arms that long. They measured a 2.5 m (8 ft 2 in) long and had three fingers instead of two. As a result of this discovery Osmolska and Roniewicz classified Deinocheirus as a member of a new family called the Deinocheiridae in the Carnosauria clade. This discovery had a large impact on the palaeontological community mainly because they had classified a new type of dinosaur that was vastly different from anything paleontologists had discovered at the time. In addition, it was one of the only female-led fossil collecting expeditions at the time.

=== Research on Jurassic and Triassic corals ===
Ewa Roniewicz conducted the first systematic studies of Jurassic and Triassic corals in Poland. These multi-week annual coral searches took place from the 1950s to 1970s, and spanned the regions of Western Pomerania, Pomeranian glacial gravels, the Kraków-Częstochowa Upland, as well as the Świętokrzyskie and Tatra mountain ranges.

Beginning in the 1960s, Roniewicz also traveled for several four-week periods to foreign Academy of Science centers, universities, and other institutions in order to personally engage with geologists and palaeontologists conducting similar research on corals and other materials of Jurassic reef structures. These short-term, so-called "exchange weeks" included visits to Prague, Georgia, and Romania, during which she met with researchers Dr. Helena Eliašová, Prof. Nina S. Bendukidze, and Dr. Aurelia Bărbulescu. She was then able to explore coral outcrops in Bohemia and Moravia, the Caucasus, and Dobrudža. With the aid of an extensive introduction to the geology of Lower Dobrudža by Dr. Bărbulescu, Roniewicz used collected corals to create a monographic study of Oxfordian and Kimmeridgian coral fauna in the area.

Roniewicz's coral research expanded to include the Triassic period in the 1970s. She received funding to study both the Late Jurassic and Late Triassic coral collections of the Pamir region near Dushanbe, Tajikistan for two months in 1974. There she established ongoing cooperation with Dr. Galina Melnikova from the Tajik Academy of Sciences. She was later contacted by Dr. Dragica Turnšek from the Slovenian Academy of Sciences and Arts, and traveled to Ljubljana in 1979 in order to study Slovenian Triassic coral Collections.

Every few years between 1977 and 1995, Roniewicz was invited to study the large collections of Rhaetian corals at the Natural History Museum in Vienna by Prof. Helmuth Zapfe at the Österreichische Akademie der Wissenschaften. She supplemented this collection review with expeditions into the Triassic coral-bearing formations of the Gosaukamm area near Adnet, Austria. She also studied the Triassic corals of the Dachstein massif in collaboration with geologists Dr. Harald Lobitzer and Dr. Gerhard W. Mandl from the Geologische Bundesanstalt in Vienna.

In order to complete a collection of Triassic corals for study, Dr. Roniewicz made several returns to the Museum für Naturkunde der Humboldt-Universitaet in Berlin and the Martin-Luther-Universität Halle-Wittenberg in the years 1975, 1996, and 2005.

Since she began the process of developing entries on fossil and extant corals for the Encyclopedy of Life in 2009, Dr. Roniewicz has continued to contribute entries for an offline taxonomic compendium of Scleractinia corals, Corallosphere.org.

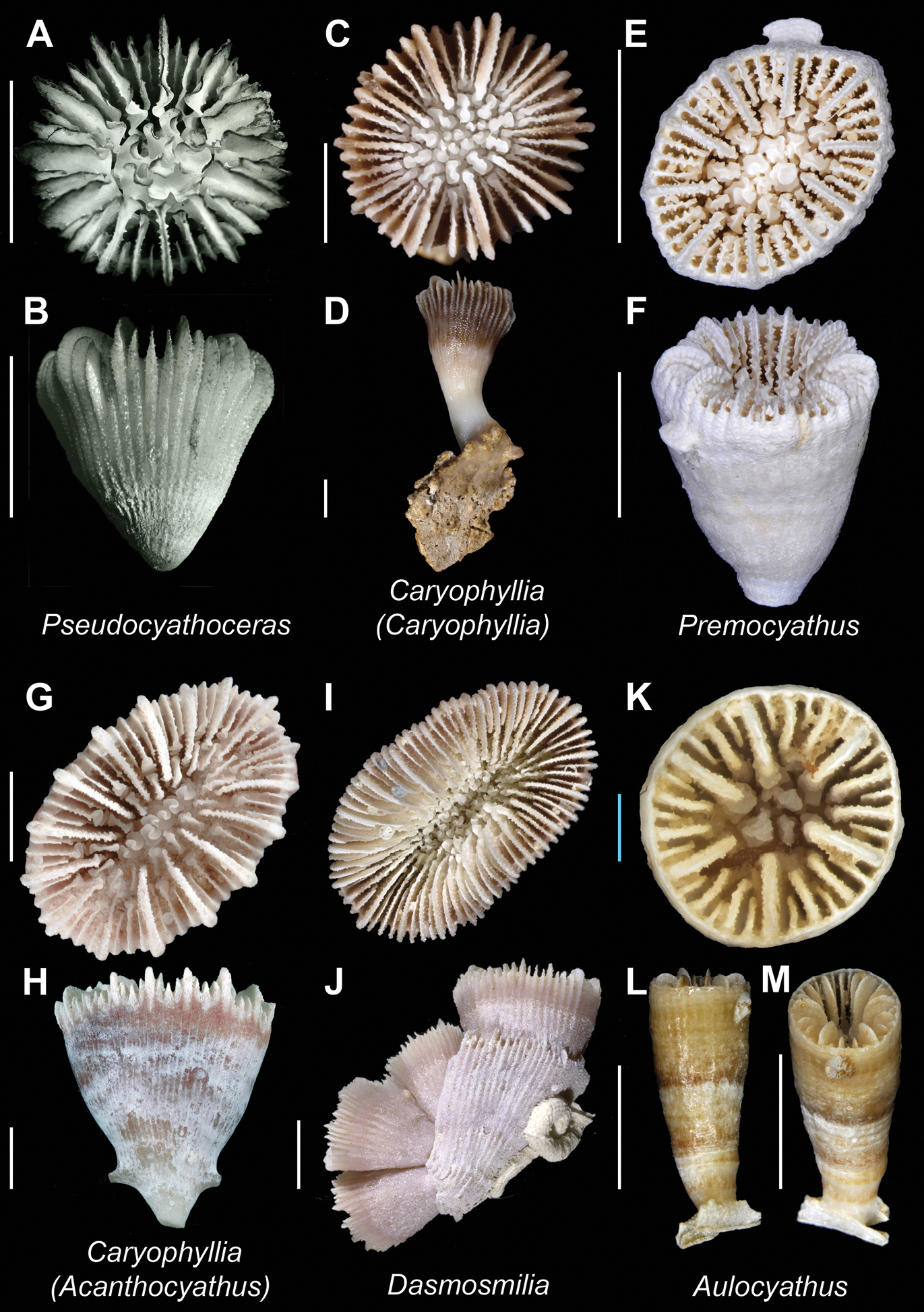
Recent azooxanthellate Scleractinia; these corals are solitary and were commonly thought to be incapable of photosymbiosis.

=== Breakthroughs in Understanding Coral Photosymbiosis ===
Ewa Roniewicz's study on "Photosymbiosis in Late Triassic scleractinian corals from the Italian Dolomites" was written in partnership with Katarzyna Frankowiak and Jarosław Stolarski in March 2021. Roniewicz and her colleagues examined the symbiotic relationship between scleractinian corals and dinoflagellate algae in Late Triassic corals from the Alpe di Specie locality. Their findings challenged the traditional classification of corals in symbiotic (zooxanthellate) corals—those which inhabit shallow, well-lit waters and form integrated colonies—and asymbiotic (azooxanthellate) corals—those which live in deeper, light-limited waters and form solitary or phaceloid colonies.

Roniewicz, Frankowiak and Stolarski's research demonstrated that certain corals with solitary or phaceloid growth forms from the Carnian period exhibited isotopic patterns typical of modern zooxanthellate corals. This suggested that photosymbiosis was present across a broader range of morphologies than previously thought, and was not limited to complex growth forms. The study indicated that symbiotic relationships between corals and algae predated the Norian-Rhaetian reef expansions, implicating the evolution of this adaptation to have occurred earlier in coral evolution than the previous field consensus assumed. Rather, the growth banding in these corals likely resulted from light-controlled responses, typical of photo-symbiotic corals. Carbon isotopic differences supported the presence of photosynthetic activity in symbiotic corals, while oxygen isotopic signatures reflected vital effects but were not directly influenced by symbiosis.

== Selected publications ==
- Osmólska, H.; Roniewicz, E. (1970). "Deinocheiridae, a new family of theropod dinosaurs". Palaeontologica Polonica. 21: 5–19. S2CID 195322354.
- Charlton, T. R.; Barber, A. J.; McGowan, A. J.; Nicoll, R. S.; Roniewicz, E.; Cook, S. E.; Barkham, S. T.; Bird, P. R. (2009). "The Triassic of Timor: lithostratigraphy, chronostratigraphy and palaeogeography". Journal of Asian Earth Sciences. 36 (4–5): 341–363. Bibcode:2009JAESc..36..341C. doi:10.1016/j.jseaes.2009.06.004.
- Carter, Nicholas. "The Weird Dinosaurs Saga: Deinocheirus." https://dinomuseum.ca/2020/01/the-weird-dinosaurs-saga-deinocheirus.
- "Early Norian (Triassic) Corals from the Northern Calcareous Alps, Austria, and the Intra-Norian Faunal Turnover." Acta Palaeontologica Polonica, 2011, p. 56, https://www.researchgate.net/publication/267256040_Early_Norian_Triassic_Corals_from_the_Northern_Calcareous_Alps_Austria_and_the_Intra-Norian_Faunal_Turnover
