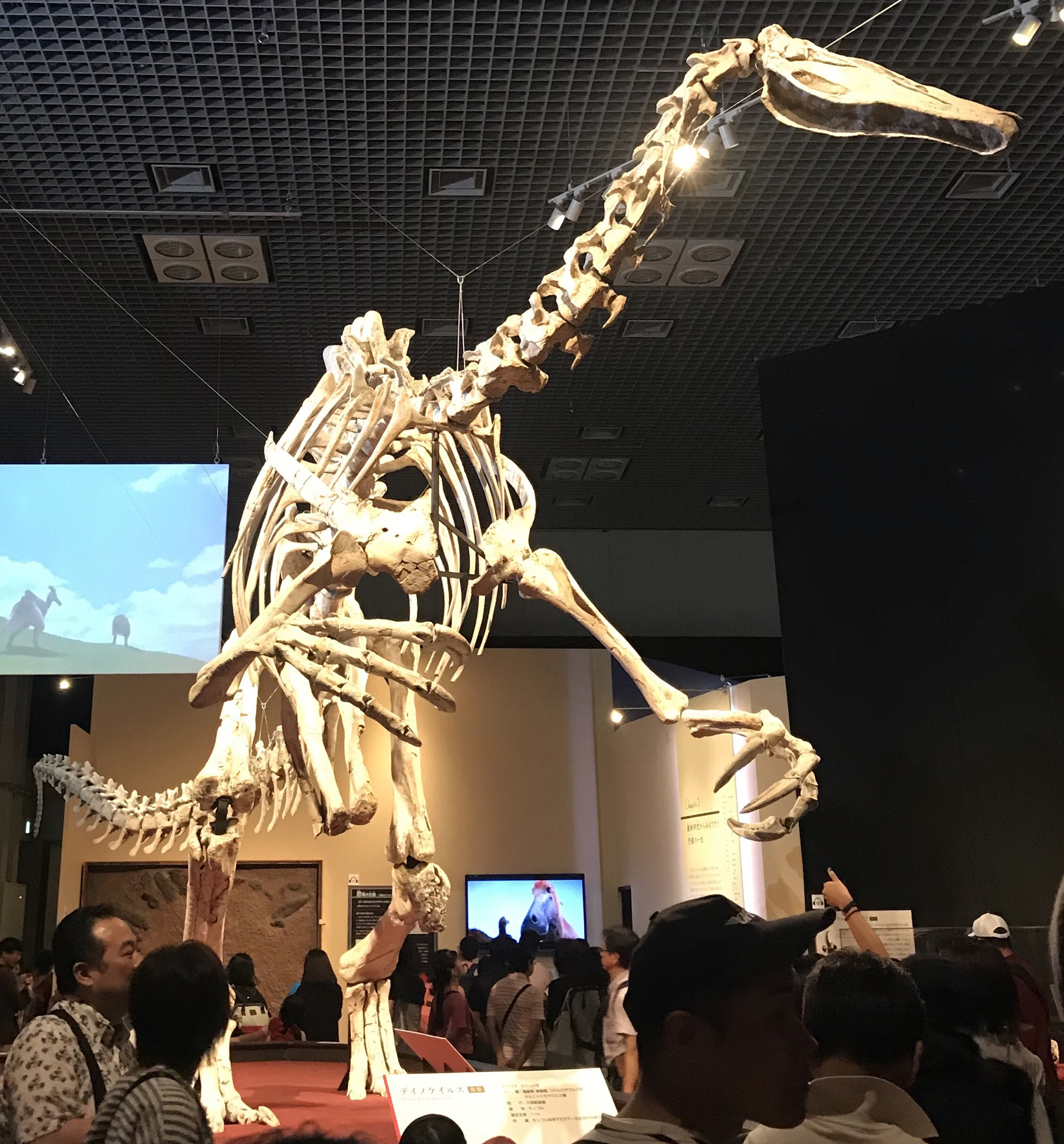
- Reconstructed skeleton in Japan

Scientific classification
- Kingdom: Animalia
- Phylum: Chordata
- Class: Reptilia
- Clade: Dinosauria
- Clade: Saurischia
- Clade: Theropoda
- Clade: †Ornithomimosauria
- Family: †Deinocheiridae
- Genus: †Deinocheirus; Osmólska & Roniewicz, 1970
- Species: †D. mirificus

Binomial name
- †Deinocheirus mirificus Osmólska & Roniewicz, 1970

= Deinocheirus =

Deinocheirus Temporal range: Late Cretaceous, Maastrichtian

Genus of theropod dinosaurs

Deinocheirus (/ˌdaɪnoʊˈkaɪrəs/ DY-no-KY-rəs) is a genus of large ornithomimosaur that lived during the Late Cretaceous around 70 million years ago. In 1965, a pair of large arms, shoulder girdles, and a few other bones of a new dinosaur were first discovered in the Nemegt Formation of Mongolia. In 1970, this specimen became the holotype of the only species within the genus, Deinocheirus mirificus; the genus name is Greek for "horrible hand". No further remains were discovered for almost fifty years, and its nature remained a mystery. Two more complete specimens were described in 2014, which shed light on many aspects of the animal. Parts of these new specimens had been looted from Mongolia some years before, but were repatriated in 2014.

Deinocheirus was an unusual ornithomimosaur, the largest of the clade at 11 m (36 ft) long, and weighing 6.5 t (7.2 short tons). Though it was a bulky animal, it had many hollow bones which saved weight. The arms were among the largest of any bipedal dinosaur at 2.4 m (7.9 ft) long, with large, blunt claws on its three-fingered hands. The legs were relatively short, and bore blunt claws. Its vertebrae had tall neural spines that formed a "sail" along its back. Most of the vertebrae and some other bones were highly pneumatised by invading air sacs. The tail ended in pygostyle-like vertebrae, which indicate the presence of a fan of feathers. The skull was 1.024 m (3.36 ft) long, with a wide bill and a deep lower jaw, similar to those of hadrosaurs.

The classification of Deinocheirus was long uncertain, and it was initially placed in the theropod group Carnosauria, but similarities with ornithomimosaurians were soon noted. After more complete remains were found, Deinocheirus was shown to be a primitive ornithomimosaurian, most closely related to the smaller genera Garudimimus and Beishanlong, together forming the family Deinocheiridae. Members of this group were not adapted for speed, unlike other ornithomimosaurs. Deinocheirus is thought to have been omnivorous; its skull shape indicates a diet of plants, fish scales were found in association with one specimen and gastroliths were also present in the stomach region of the specimen. The large claws may have been used for digging and gathering plants. Bite marks on Deinocheirus bones have been attributed to the tyrannosaurid Tarbosaurus.

== Discovery ==
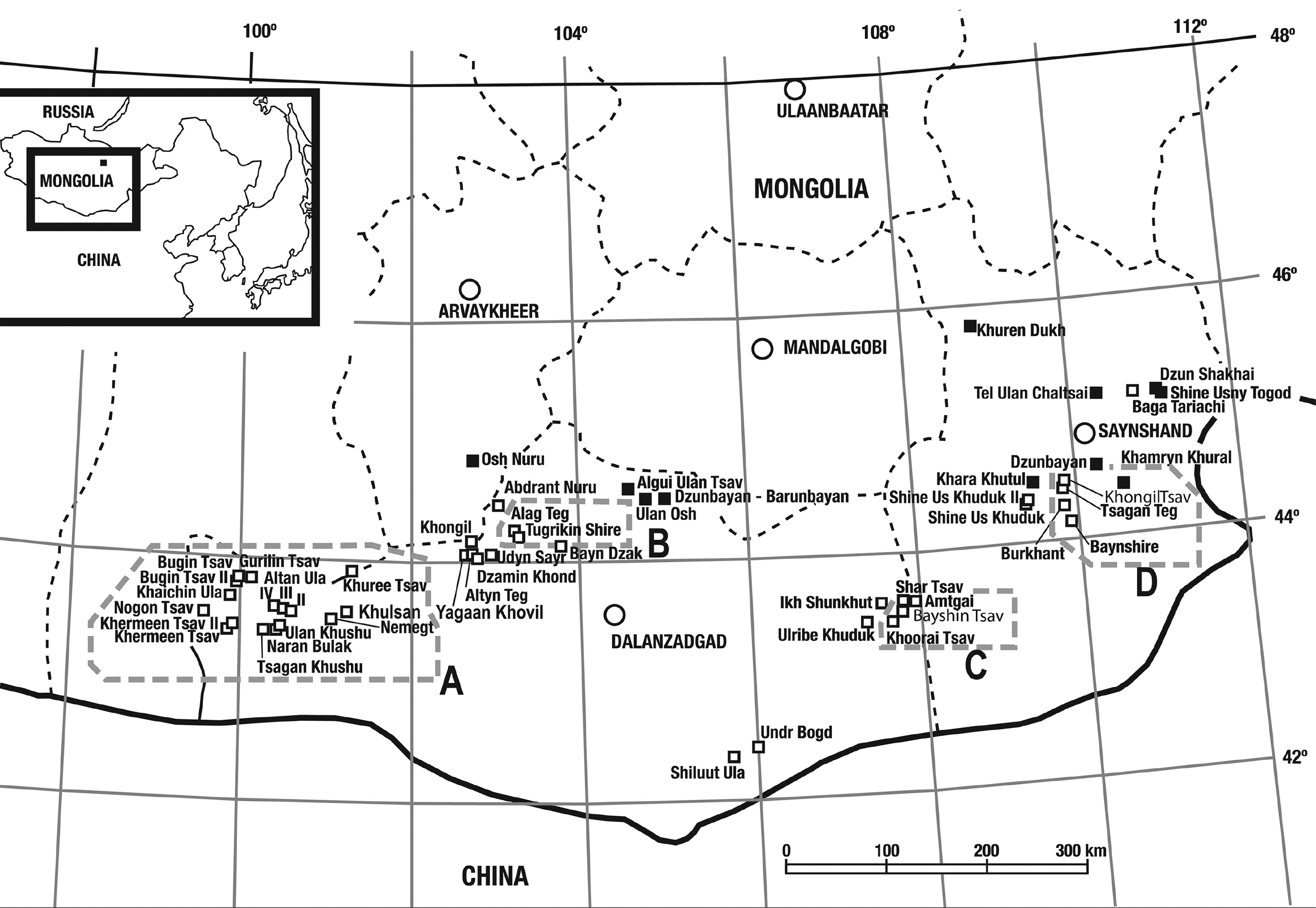
Cretaceous-aged dinosaur fossil localities of Mongolia; Deinocheirus fossils have been collected in the Altan Ula III, IV, and Bugiin Tsav localities of area A (left)

The first known fossil remains of Deinocheirus were discovered by Polish palaeontologist Zofia Kielan-Jaworowska on July 9, 1965, at the Altan Ula III site (coordinates: 43°33.987′N 100°28.959′E) in the Nemegt Basin of the Gobi Desert. She was part of a Polish group accompanied by Mongolian palaeontologist Rinchen Barsbold during the 1963–1965 Polish-Mongolian palaeontological expeditions, which were organised by the Polish Academy of Sciences and the Mongolian Academy of Sciences. The crew spent July 9–11 excavating the specimen and loading it onto a vehicle. A 1968 report by Kielan-Jaworowska and Naydin Dovchin, which summarised the accomplishments of the expeditions, announced that the remains represented a new family of theropod dinosaur.

The specimen was discovered on a small hill in sandstone, and consists of a partial, disarticulated skeleton, most parts of which had probably eroded away at the time of discovery. The specimen consisted of both forelimbs, excluding the claws of the right hand, the complete shoulder girdle, centra of three dorsal vertebrae, five ribs, gastralia (belly ribs), and two ceratobranchialia. The specimen was made the holotype of Deinocheirus mirificus, named by Halszka Osmólska and Ewa Roniewicz in 1970. The generic name is derived from Greek deinos (δεινός), meaning "horrible", and cheir (χείρ), meaning "hand", due to the size and strong claws of the forelimbs. The specific name comes from Latin and means "unusual" or "peculiar", chosen for the unusual structure of the forelimbs. The Polish-Mongolian expeditions were notable for being led by women, among the first to name new dinosaurs. The original specimen number of the holotype was ZPal MgD-I/6, but it has since been re-catalogued as MPC-D 100/18.

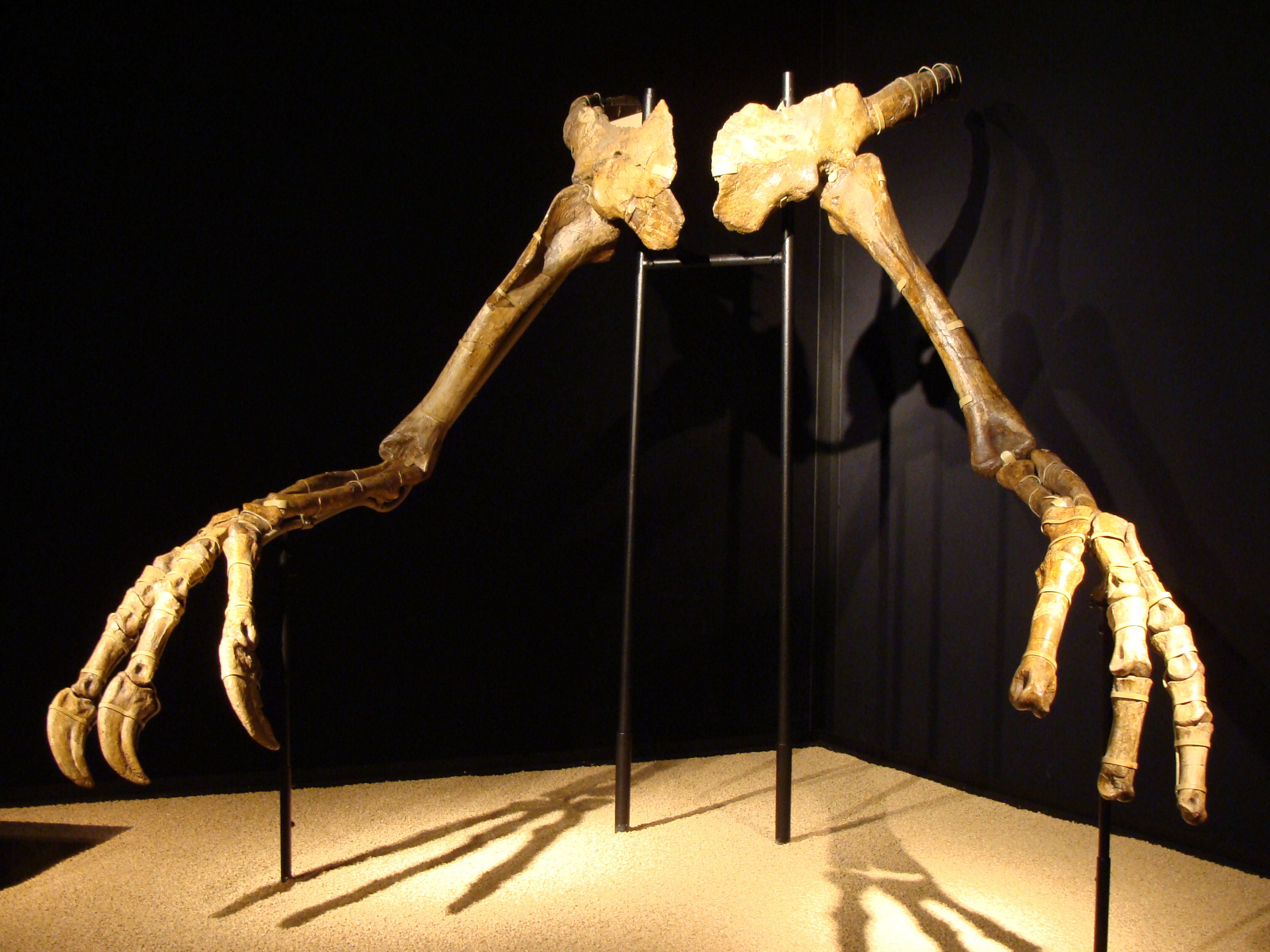
Forelimbs and shoulder girdles of holotype specimen MPC-D 100/18 on temporary exhibit in CosmoCaixa

The paucity of known Deinocheirus remains inhibited a thorough understanding of the animal for almost half a century onwards, and the scientific literature often described it as among the most "enigmatic", "mysterious", and "bizarre" of dinosaurs. The holotype arms became part of a traveling exhibit of Mongolian dinosaur fossils, touring various countries. In 2012, Phil R. Bell, Philip J. Currie, and Yuong-Nam Lee announced the discovery of additional elements of the holotype specimen, including fragments of gastralia, found by a Korean-Mongolian team which re-located the original quarry in 2008. Bite marks on two gastralia were identified as belonging to Tarbosaurus, and it was proposed that this accounted for the scattered, disassociated state of the holotype specimen.

=== Additional specimens ===
In 2013, the discovery of two new Deinocheirus specimens were announced before the annual Society of Vertebrate Paleontology (SVP) conference by Lee, Barsbold, Currie, and colleagues. Housed at the Mongolian Academy of Sciences, these two headless individuals were given the specimen numbers MPC-D 100/127 and MPC-D 100/128. MPC-D 100/128, a subadult specimen, was found by scientists in the Altan Ula IV locality (coordinates: 43°36.091′N 100°27.066′E) of the Nemegt Formation during the Korea-Mongolia International Dinosaur Expedition in 2006, but had already been damaged by fossil poachers. The second specimen, MPC-D 100/127, was found by scientists in the Bugiin Tsav locality (coordinates: 43°54.025′N 99°58.359′E) in 2009. It is slightly larger than the holotype, and it could be clearly identified as Deinocheirus by its left forelimb, and therefore helped identify the earlier collected specimen as Deinocheirus. The specimen had also been excavated by poachers, who had removed the skull, hands and feet, but left behind a single toe bone. It had probably been looted after 2002, based on money left in the quarry. Skulls, claw bones and teeth are often selectively targeted by poachers on the expense of the rest of the skeletons (which are often vandalized), due to their saleability. Currie stated in an interview that it was a policy of their team to investigate quarries after they had been looted and recover anything of significance, and that finding any new Deinocheirus fossils was cause for celebration, even without the poached parts. A virtual model of Deinocheirus revealed at the SVP presentation brought applause from the crowd of attending palaeontologists, and the American palaeontologist Stephen L. Brusatte stated he had never been as surprised by a SVP talk, though new fossils are routinely presented at the conference.

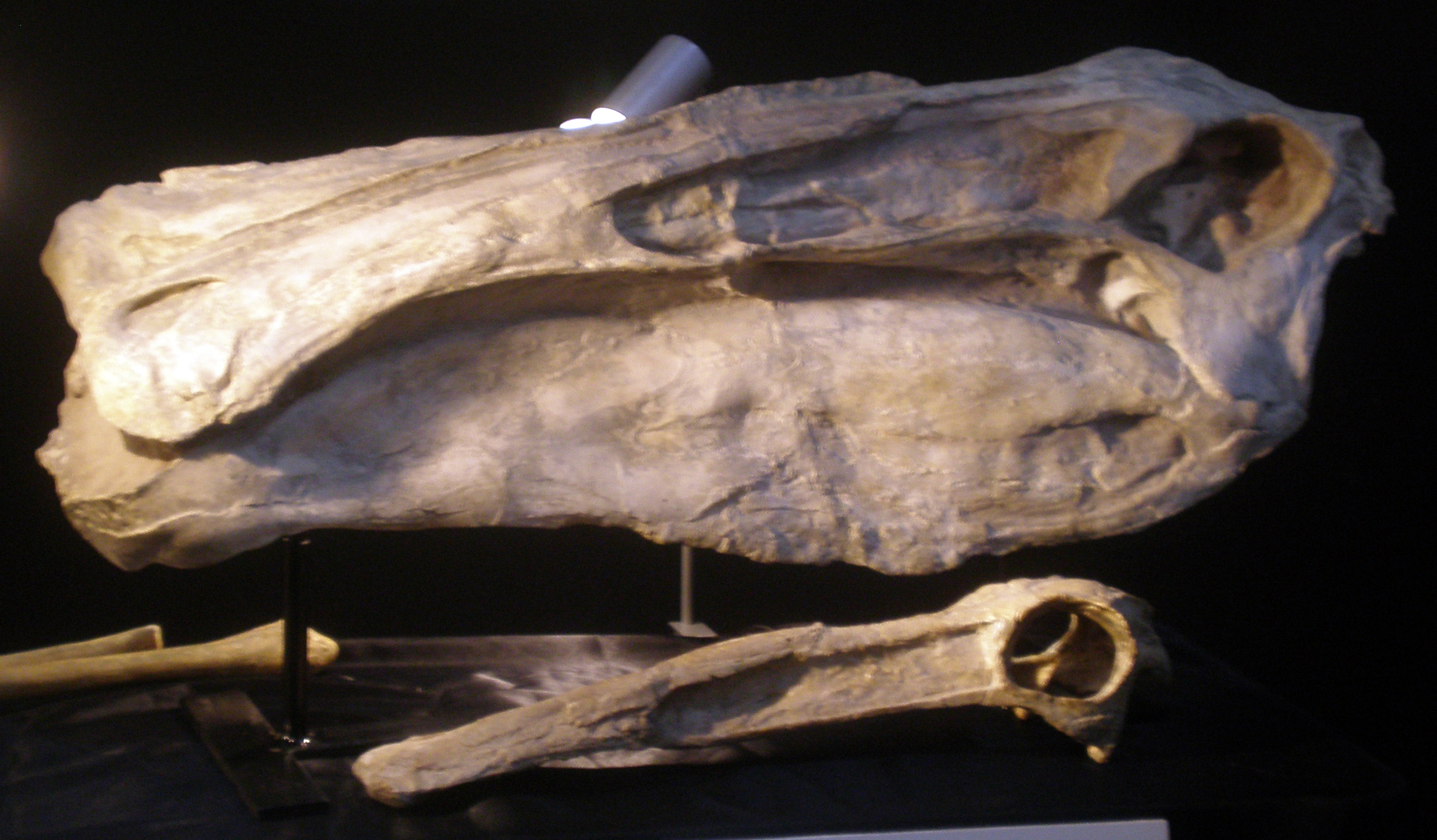
Cast of specimen MPC-D 100/127's skull (the first known skull of this genus), on exhibit at Munich Fossil Show

After the new specimens were announced, it was rumoured that a looted skull had found its way to a European museum through the black market. The poached elements were spotted in a private European collection by the French fossil trader François Escuillé, who notified Belgian palaeontologist Pascal Godefroit about them in 2011. They suspected the remains belonged to Deinocheirus, and contacted the Korean-Mongolian team. Escuillé subsequently acquired the fossils and donated them to the Royal Belgian Institute of Natural Sciences. The recovered material consisted of a skull, a left hand, and feet, which had been collected in Mongolia, sold to a Japanese buyer, and resold to a German party (the fossils also passed through China and France). The team concluded that these elements belonged to specimen MPC-D 100/127, as the single leftover toe bone fit perfectly into the unprepared matrix of a poached foot, the bone and matrix matched in colour, and because the elements belonged to an individual of the same size, with no overlap in skeletal elements. On May 1, 2014, the fossils were repatriated to Mongolia by a delegation from the Belgian Museum, during a ceremony held at the Mongolian Academy of Sciences. The reunited skeleton was deposited at the Central Museum of Mongolian Dinosaurs in Ulaanbaatar, along with a Tarbosaurus skeleton which had also been brought back after being stolen. American palaeontologist Thomas R. Holtz stated in an interview that the new Deinocheirus remains looked like the "product of a secret love affair between a hadrosaur and Gallimimus".

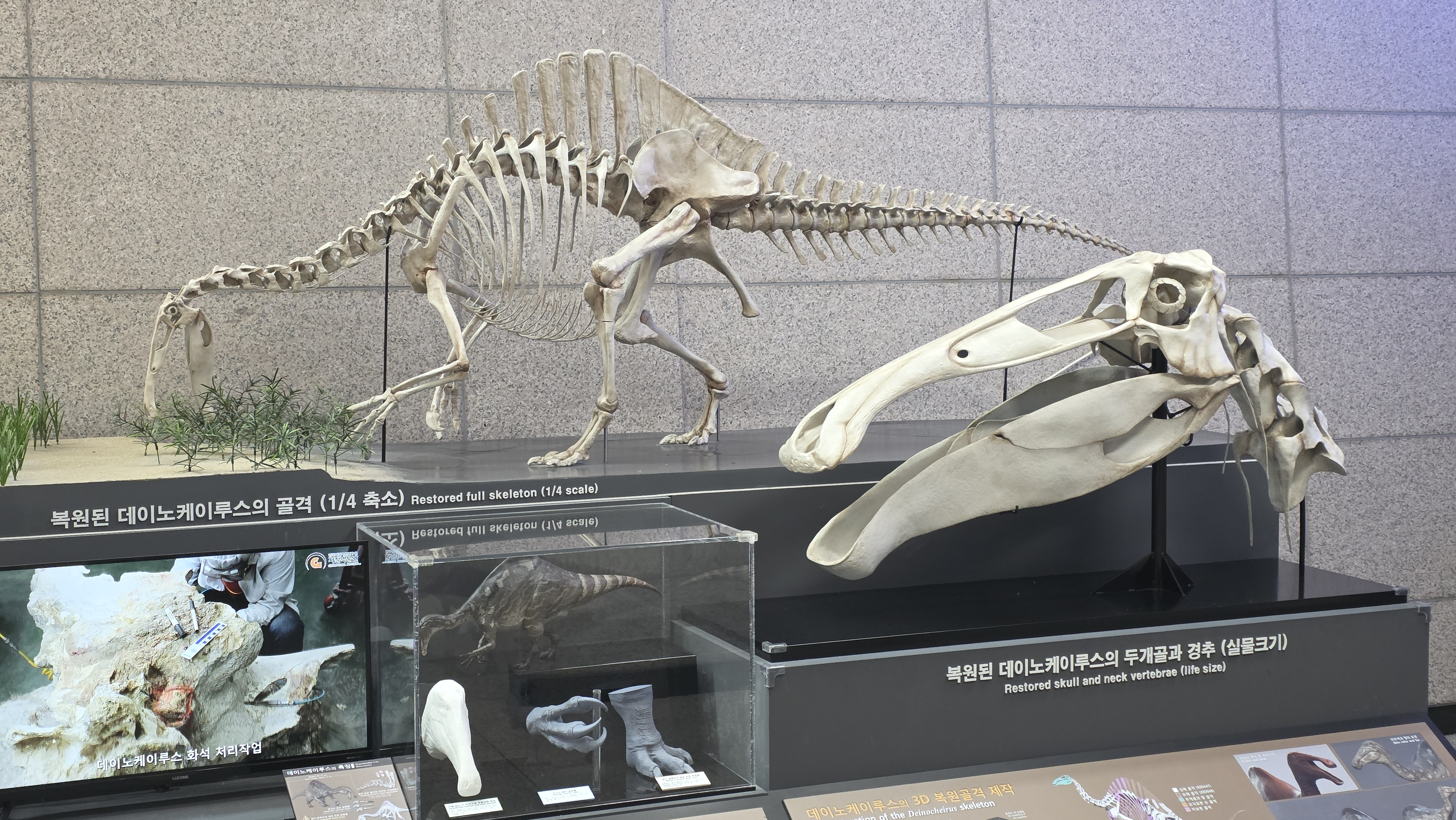
3D-printed 1/4 sized skeleton and life sized skull replica, on exhibit at Geological Museum, Korea Institute of Geoscience and Mineral Resources

Combined with the poached elements, both new specimens represent almost the entire skeleton of Deinocheirus, as MPC-D 100/127 includes all material apart from the middle dorsal vertebrae, most caudal vertebrae, and the right forelimb; MPC-D 100/128 fills in most gaps of the other skeleton, with nearly all dorsal and caudal vertebrae, the ilium, a partial ischium, and most of the left hindlimb. In 2014, the specimens were described by Lee, Barsbold, Currie, Yoshitsugu Kobayashi, Hang-Jae Lee Lee, Godefroit, Escuillié, and Tsogtbaatar Chinzorig. A similar series of events was reported earlier in 2014 with Spinosaurus, another sail-backed theropod which had only been known from few remains since 1912. Poached remains were reunited with specimens obtained by scientists, and Spinosaurus was shown to have been quite different from other spinosaurids. The two cases showed that the lifestyle and appearance of incompletely known extinct animals cannot always be safely inferred from close relatives. By 2017, the Mongolian government had increased its effort to seize poached fossils from collectors and repatriate them, but proving their provenance had become a scientific and political concern. Therefore, a study tested the possibility of identifying poached fossils by geochemical methods, using Deinocheirus and other Nemegt dinosaurs as examples. In 2018, numerous large, tridactyl (three-toed) tracks were reported from the Nemegt locality (discovered in 2007 alongside sauropod tracks). Though the tracks were similar to those of hadrosaurs, no tracks of hadrosaur hands were identified, and since the feet of Deinocheirus are now known to have been similar to those of hadrosaurs, it cannot be ruled out that the tracks were made by this genus.

== Description ==
Size of three specimens (holotype in green) compared to a human

Deinocheirus is the largest ornithomimosaurian (ostrich dinosaur) discovered; according to the 2014 description, the largest known specimen measured about 11 m (36 ft) long, with an estimated weight of 6.36 t (7.01 short tons). The two other known specimens are smaller, the holotype being 94% as big while the smallest, a subadult, is only 74% as big. In 2016, Gregory S. Paul presented a higher length estimate of 11.5 m (38 ft) but a lower mass estimate of 5 t (5.5 short tons). Holtz estimated the length of Deinocheirus at 12 metres (39 ft) in 2012. In 2020, Campione and Evans gave a body mass estimate of approximately 6.5 t (7.2 short tons) or 7.3 t (8.0 short tons) depending on calculation method they used. When only the incomplete holotype arms were known, various sizes were extrapolated from them by different methods. A 2010 study estimated the hip height of Deinocheirus to be 3.3–3.6 m (11–12 ft). The weight had previously been estimated between 2 tonnes (2.2 short tons) and 12 metric tons (13 short tons). Enormous sizes were also suggested by comparing the arms with those of tyrannosaurs, even though members of that group did not have large arms in proportion to their body size.

=== Skull ===
3D-printed skull replica, KIGAM

The only known skull, belonging to the largest specimen, measures 1.024 m (3.36 ft) from the premaxilla at the front to the back of the occipital condyle. The widest part of the skull behind the eyes is only 23 cm (9.1 in) wide in comparison. The skull was similar to those of other ornithomimosaurs in being low and narrow, but differed in that the snout was more elongated. The skull bone walls were rather thin, about 6 mm (0.24 in). It had a rounded, flattened beak, which would have been covered by keratin in life. The nostrils were turned upwards, and the nasal bone was a narrow strap that extended up above the eye sockets. The outer diameter of the scleral rings in the eyes was small, 8.4 cm (3.3 in), compared to the size of the skull. The lower temporal fenestrae, openings behind the eyes, were partially closed off by the jugal bones, similar to Gallimimus. The jaws were toothless and down-turned, and the lower jaw was very massive and deep compared to the slender and low upper jaw. The relative size of the lower jaw was closer to that of tyrannosaurids than to other ornithomimosaurs. The snout was spatulate (flared outwards to the sides) and 25 cm (9.8 in) wide, which is wider than the skull roof. This shape was similar to the snout of duck-billed hadrosaurids.

=== Postcranial skeleton ===
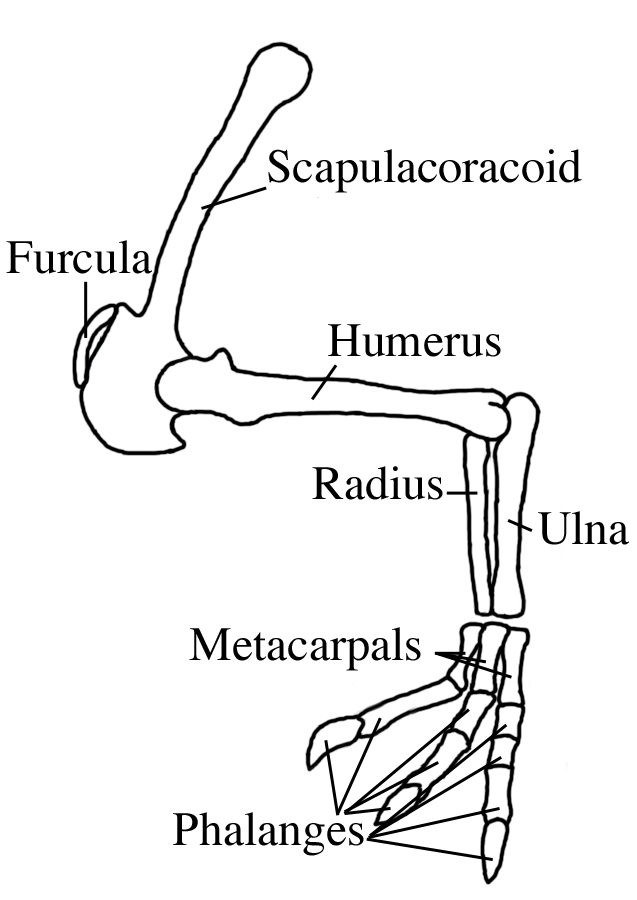
Labelled diagram of the left arm and shoulder blade of Deinocheirus

Deinocheirus and Therizinosaurus possessed the longest forelimbs known for any bipedal dinosaurs. The holotype forelimbs measure 2.4 m (7.9 ft) long – the humerus (upper arm bone) is 93.8 cm (36.9 in), the ulna 68.8 cm (27.1 in), and the hand is 77 cm (30 in) – including the 19.6-centimeter-long (7.7 in) recurved claws. Each scapulocoracoid of the shoulder girdle has a length of 1.53 m (5 ft). Each half of the paired ceratobranchialia measure 42 cm (17 in). The shoulder-blade was long and narrow, and the deltopectoralis crest was pronounced and triangular. The upper arm (humerus) was relatively slender, and only slightly longer than the hand. The ulna and radius (lower arm bones) were elongate and not firmly connected to each other in a syndesmosis. The metacarpus was long compared to the fingers. The three fingers were about equal in length, the first being the stoutest and the second the longest. Various rough areas and impressions on the forelimbs indicate the presence of powerful muscles. Most articular surfaces of the arm bones were deeply furrowed, indicating that the animal had thick pads of cartilage between the joints. Though the arms of Deinocheirus were large, the ratio between them and the shoulder girdle was less than that of the smaller ornithomimosaur Ornithomimus. The arm bones of Deinocheirus were similar in proportions to those of the small theropod Compsognathus.

Though Deinocheirus was a bulky animal, its dorsal ribs were tall and relatively straight, indicating that the body was narrow. The ten neck vertebrae were low and long, and progressively shorter backwards from the skull. This resulted in a more S-curved neck than seen in other ornithomimosaurs, due to the larger skull. The neural spines of the twelve back vertebrae became increasingly longer from front to back, the last one being 8.5 times the height of the centrum part. This is almost the same as the highest ratio in the neural spines of the theropod Spinosaurus. The neural spines had a system of interconnecting ligaments, which stiffened the vertebral column allowing it to support the abdomen while transmitting the stress to the hips and hindlimbs. Together, the neural spines formed a tall "sail" along the lower back, hips, and base of the tail, somewhat similar to that of Spinosaurus.

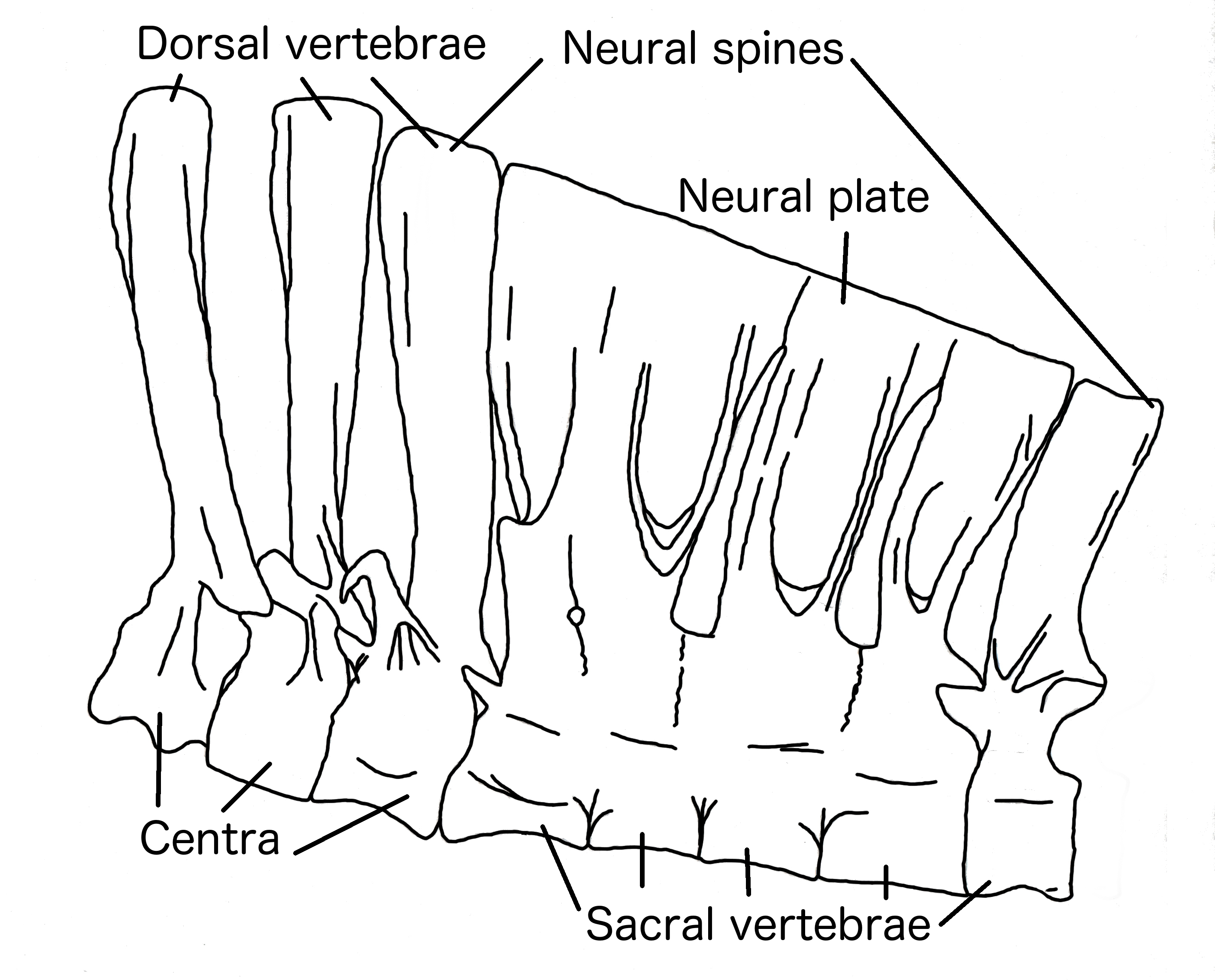
Labeled diagram of some of the vertebrae that form a "sail"

All the vertebrae were highly pneumatized by invading air sacs, except for the atlas bone and the hindmost tail-vertebrae, and were thereby connected to the respiratory system. The back vertebrae were as pneumatised as those of sauropod dinosaurs, and had an extensive system of depressions. These adaptations may be correlated with gigantism, as they reduce weight. The six vertebrae of the sacrum were also tall and pneumatised, and all but the first one were fused together at the top, their neural spines forming a neural plate. The ilium, the top hip bone, was also partially pneumatised close to the sacral vertebrae. Part of the pelvis was hypertrophied (enlarged) compared to other ornithomimosaurs, to support the weight of the animal with strong muscle attachments. The front hip bones tilted upwards in life. The tail of Deinocheirus ended in at least two fused vertebrae, which were described as similar to the pygostyle of oviraptorosaurian and therizinosauroid theropods. Ornithomimosaurs are known to have had pennaceous feathers, so this feature suggests that they might have had a fan of feathers at the tail end.

The wishbone (furcula), an element not known from any other ornithomimosaurs, was U-shaped. The hindlimbs were relatively short, and the thigh bone (femur) was longer than the shin bone (tibia), as is common for large animals. The metatarsus was short and not arctometatarsalian (a condition among ornithomimosaurs where the third metatarsal was wedged between the two on each of its sides), as in most other theropods. The claw bones of the feet were blunt and broad-tipped instead of tapered, unlike other theropods, but resembled the unguals of large ornithischian dinosaurs. The proportions of the toe bones resembled those of tyrannosaurs, due to the large weight they had to bear.

== Classification ==
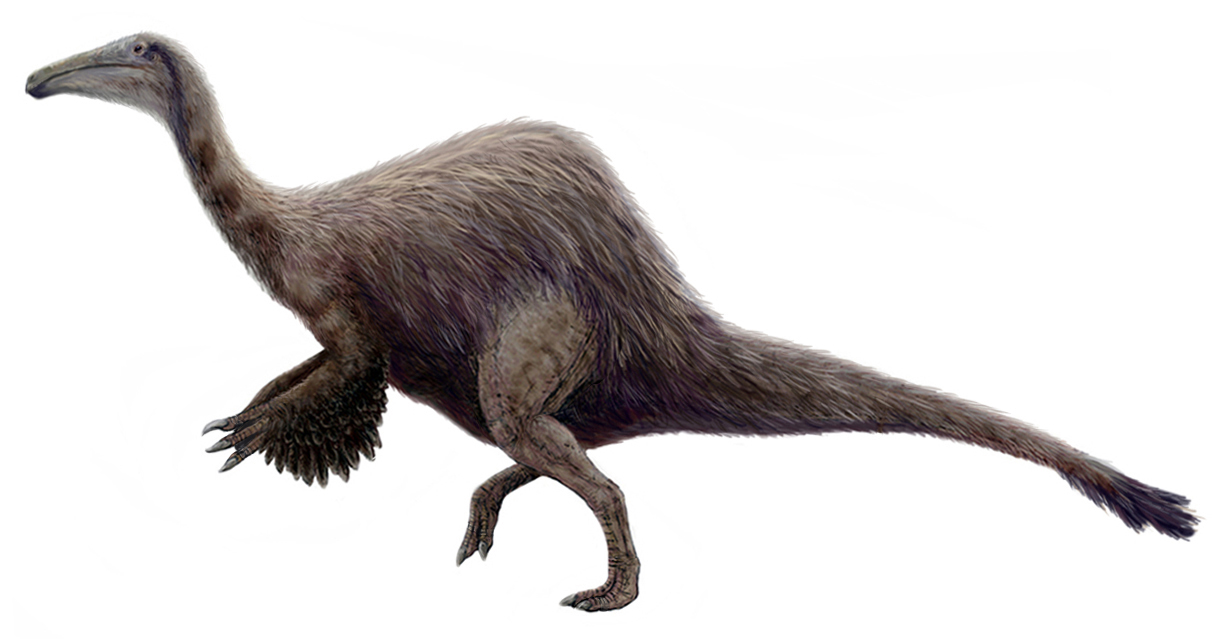
Hypothetical life restoration

When Deinocheirus was only known from the original forelimbs, its taxonomic relationship was difficult to determine, and several hypotheses were proposed. Osmólska and Roniewicz initially concluded that Deinocheirus did not belong in any already named theropod family, so they created a new, monotypic family Deinocheiridae, placed in the infraorder Carnosauria. This was due to the large size and thick-walled limb bones, but they also found some similarities with Ornithomimus, and, to a lesser extent, Allosaurus. In 1971, John Ostrom first proposed that Deinocheirus belonged with the Ornithomimosauria, while noting that it contained both ornithomimosaurian and non-ornithomimosaurian characters. In 1976, Rhinchen Barsbold named the order Deinocheirosauria, which was to include the supposedly related genera Deinocheirus and Therizinosaurus. A relationship between Deinocheirus and the long-armed therizinosaurs was supported by some later writers, but they are not considered to be closely related today.

In 2004, Peter Makovicky, Kobayashi and Currie pointed out that Deinocheirus was likely a primitive ornithomimosaurian, since it lacked some of the features typical of the Ornithomimidae family. Primitive traits include its recurved claws, the low humerus-to-scapula ratio, and the lack of a syndesmosis. A 2006 study by Kobayashi and Barsbold found Deinocheirus to be possibly the most primitive ornithomimosaur, but was unable to further resolve its affinities, due to the lack of skull and hindlimb elements. A cladistic analysis accompanying the 2014 description of the two much more complete specimens found that Deinocheirus formed a clade with Garudimimus and Beishanlong, which were therefore included in the Deinocheiridae. The resulting cladogram follows below:

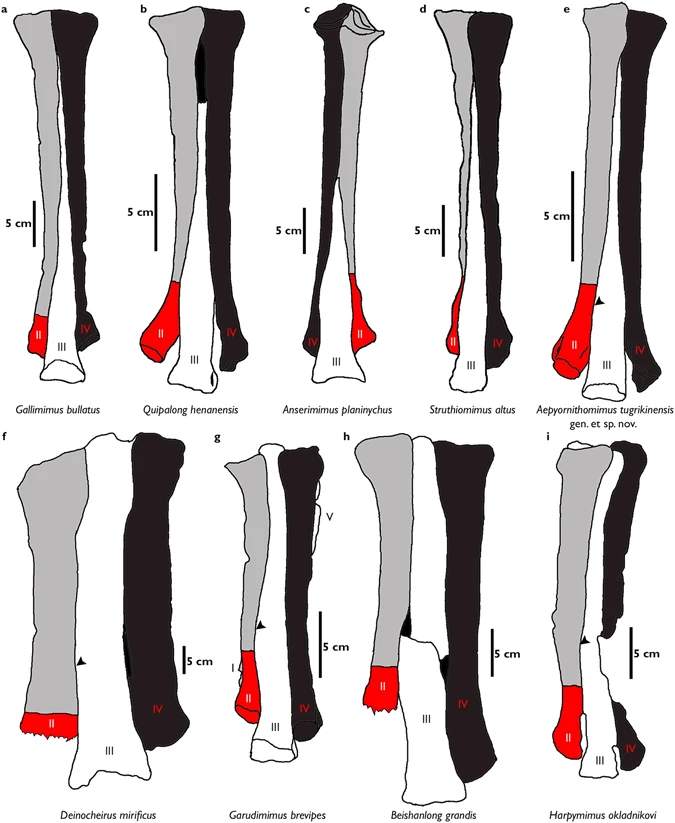
Metatarsal footbones of ornithomimosaurs; the foot of Deinocheirus (lower left) was not arctometatarsalian (see middle bone in white), unlike many relatives

- Ornithomimosauria
  - Nqwebasaurus
  - unnamed
    - Pelecanimimus
    - unnamed
      - Shenzhousaurus
      - unnamed
        - Harpymimus
        - unnamed
          - Deinocheiridae
            - Beishanlong
            - unnamed
              - Garudimimus
              - Deinocheirus
          - Ornithomimidae
            - Anserimimus
            - unnamed
              - Gallimimus
              - unnamed
                - Ornithomimus
                - Struthiomimus

The 2014 study defined Deinocheiridae as a clade including all taxa with a more recent common ancestor with Deinocheirus mirificus than with Ornithomimus velox. The three members share various anatomical features in the limbs. The 2014 cladogram suggested that ornithomimosaurians diverged into two major lineages in the Early Cretaceous: Deinocheiridae and Ornithomimidae. Unlike other ornithomimosaurians, deinocheirids were not built for running. The anatomical peculiarities of Deinocheirus when compared to other, much smaller ornithomimosaurs, can largely be explained by its much larger size and weight. Deinocheirids and the smaller ornithomimids did not have teeth, unlike more primitive ornithomimosaurs. In 2020, the deinocheirid Paraxenisaurus from Mexico was named, making it the first member of the group known from North America. Its describers suggested deinocheirids originated in Laurasia (the northern supercontinent of the time) or that they dispersed across polar regions in the Northern Hemisphere, and a similar interchange is also known to have occurred in other dinosaur groups with Asian affinities during the Campanian–Maastrichtian ages. This study also found Harpymimus to be a basal deinocheirid, while placing Beishanlong just outside the group, as a basal ornithomimosaur.

== Palaeobiology ==
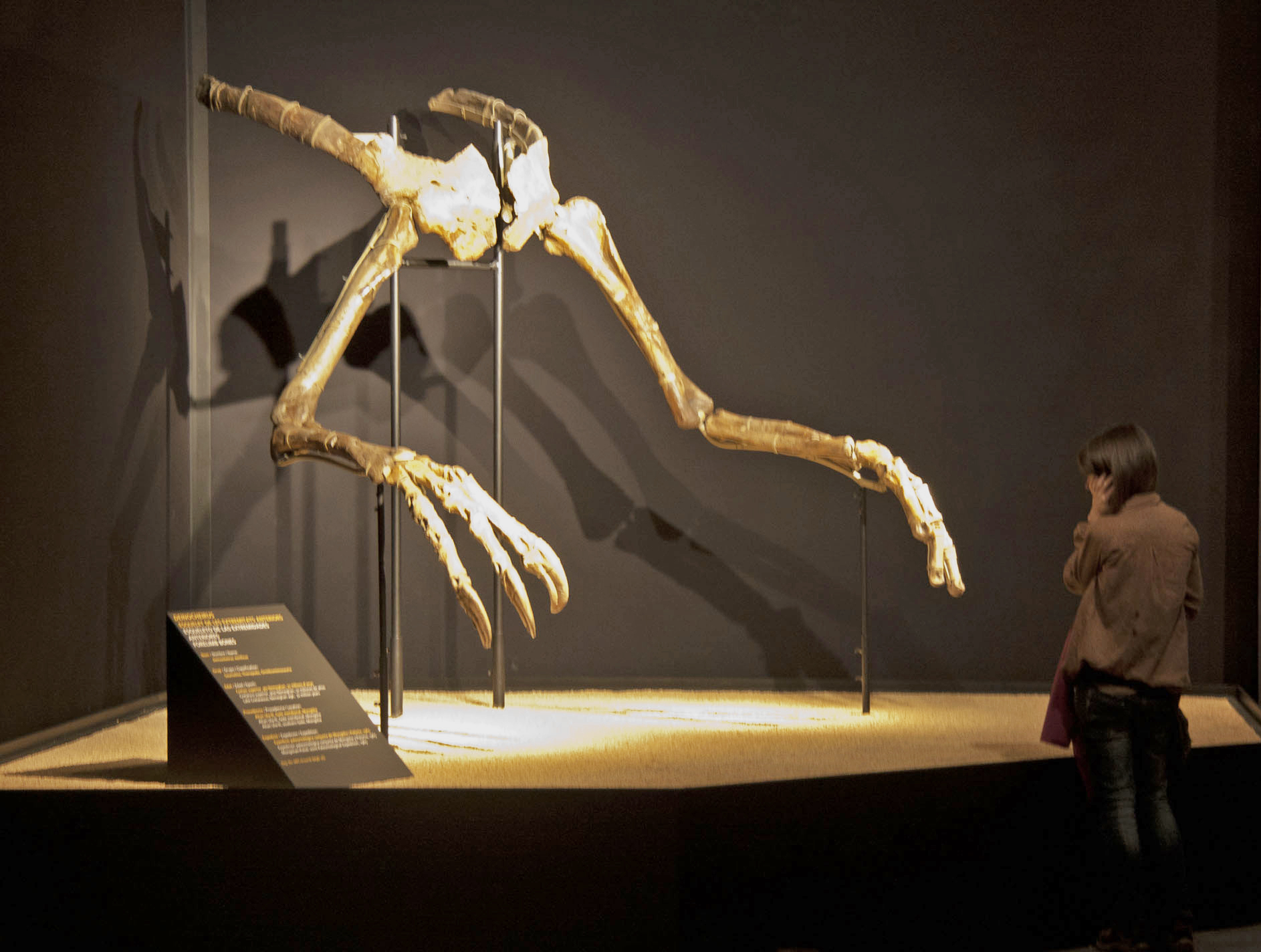
Holotype specimen MPC-D 100/18 on exhibit in CosmoCaixa

The blunt and short hand-claws of Deinocheirus were similar to those of the therizinosaur Alxasaurus, which indicates the long arms and claws were used for digging and gathering plants. The blunt claws of the feet could have helped the animal from sinking into substrate when wading. The robust hind limbs and hip region indicates the animal moved slowly. The large size of the animal may have protected it against predators such as Tarbosaurus, but in turn it lost the running ability of other ornithomimosaurs. The long neural spines and possible tail fan may have been used for display behaviour. Deinocheirus was likely diurnal (active during the day), since the scleral rings of the eyes were relatively small in comparison with its skull length. The hand had good mobility relative to the lower arm, but was capable of only a limited flexing motion, unable to close in grasping.

The brain of Deinocheirus was reconstructed through CT scans and presented at the 2014 Society of Vertebrate Paleontology conference. The brain was globular and similar in shape to that of birds and troodontid theropods, the cerebrum was expanded in a way similar to most theropods, and the olfactory tracts were relatively large. The brain was proportionally small and compact, and its reptile encephalization quotient (brain-body ratio) was estimated at 0.69, which is low for theropods, and similar to sauropods. Other ornithomimosaurs have proportionally large brains, and the small brain of Deinocheirus may reflect its social behaviour or diet. Its coordination and balance would not have been as important as for carnivorous theropods.

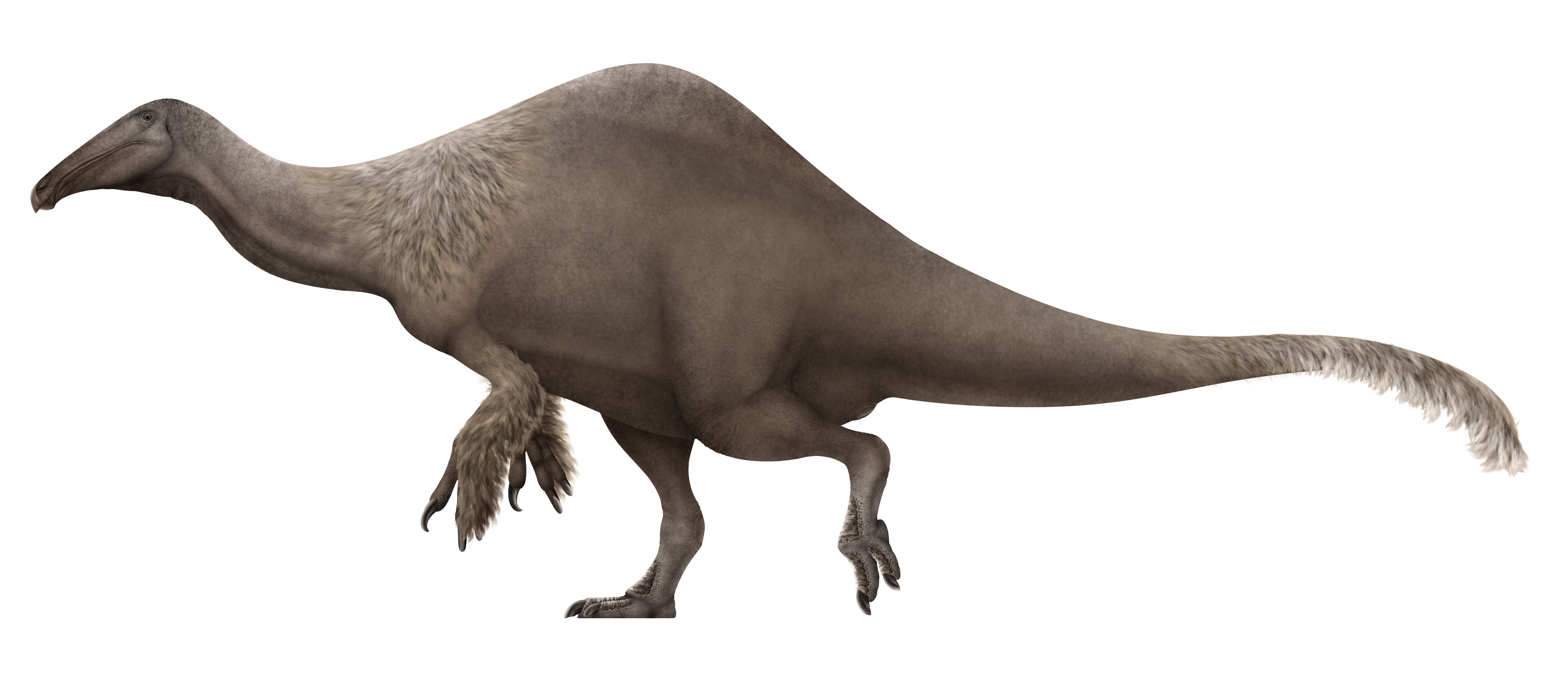
Hypothetical life restoration showing sparse feathering

In 2015, Akinobu Watanabe and colleagues found that together with Archaeornithomimus and Gallimimus, Deinocheirus had the most pneumatised skeleton among ornithomimosaurs. Pneumatisation is thought to be advantageous for flight in modern birds, but its function in non-avian dinosaurs is not known with certainty. It has been proposed that pneumatisation was used to reduce the mass of large bones (associated with gigantic size in the case of Deinocheirus), that it was related to high metabolism, balance during locomotion, or used for thermoregulation.

A bone microstructure study presented at the European Association of Vertebrate Palaeontologists in 2015 showed that Deinocheirus probably had a high metabolic rate, and grew rapidly before reaching sexual maturity. A histological study of a gastralia fragment from the holotype presented at a 2018 conference showed that its internal structure was similar to that of ossified tendons of other theropods. The osteons contained possible canaliculi, which would be the first-known occurrence of such structures in a basal ornithomimosaur. The structure of the periosteum and lack of growth arrest lines suggests that the holotype was a fully grown adult.

=== Diet ===
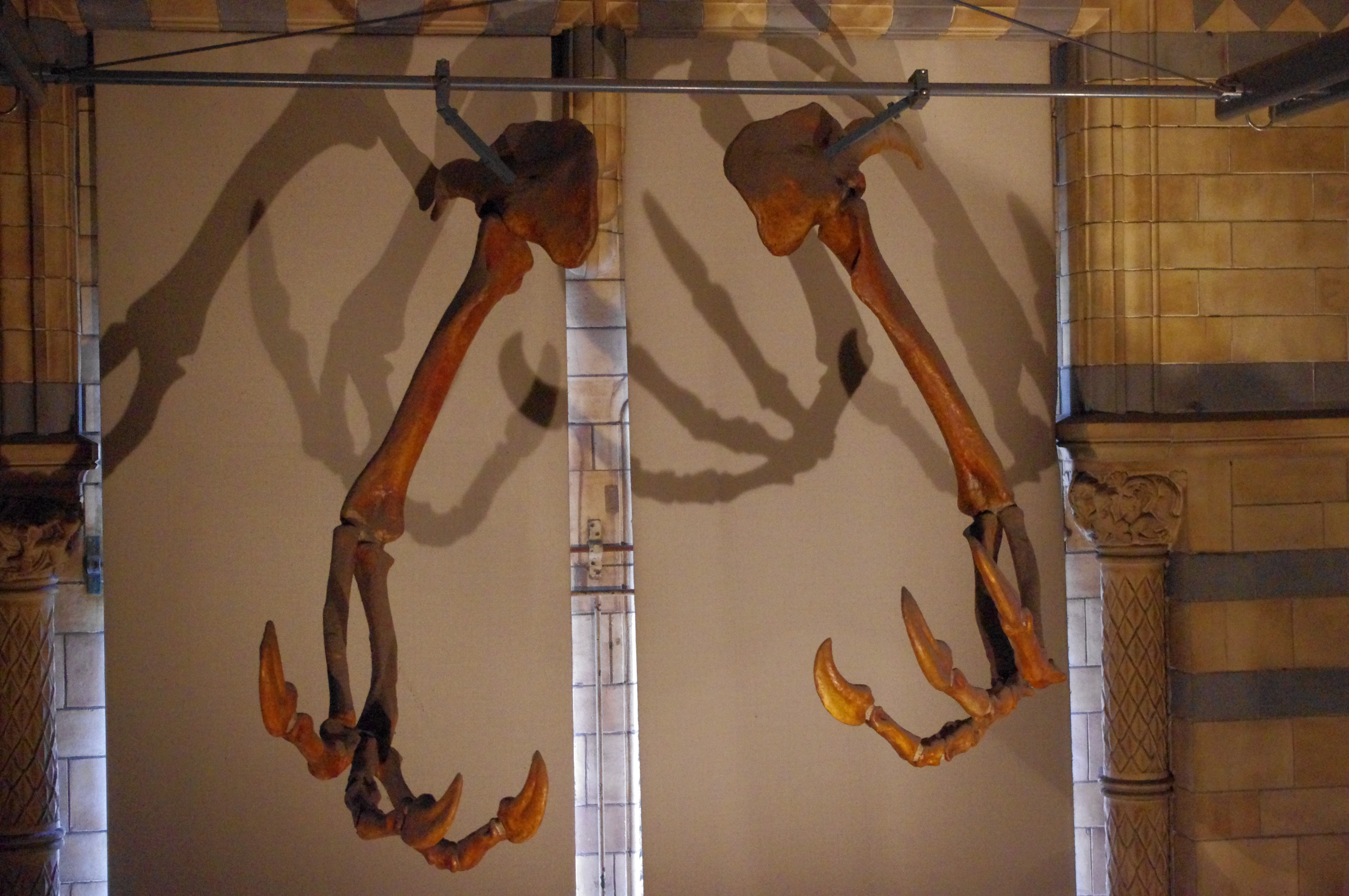
Reconstructed cast of the holotype arms in Natural History Museum

The distinct shape of the skull shows that Deinocheirus had a more specialised diet than other ornithomimosaurs. The beak was similar to that of ducks, which indicates it may have likewise foraged in water, or browsed near the ground like some sauropods and hadrosaurs. The attachment sites for the muscles that open and close the jaws were very small in comparison to the size of the skull, which indicates Deinocheirus had a weak bite force. The skull was likely adapted for cropping soft understorey or water vegetation. The depth of the lower jaw indicates the presence of a large tongue, which could have assisted the animal in sucking in food material obtained with the broad beak when foraging on the bottom of freshwater bodies.

More than 1,400 gastroliths (stomach stones, 8 to 87mm in size) were found among the ribs and gastralia of specimen MPC-D100/127. The ratio of gastrolith mass to total weight, 0.0022, supports the theory that these gastroliths helped the toothless animals in grinding their food. Features such as the presence of a beak and a U-shaped, downturned jaw, are indicators of facultative (optional) herbivory among coelurosaurian theropods. In spite of these features, fish vertebrae and scales were also found among the gastroliths, which suggests that it was an omnivore. Ornithomimosaurs in general are thought to have fed on both plants and small animals.

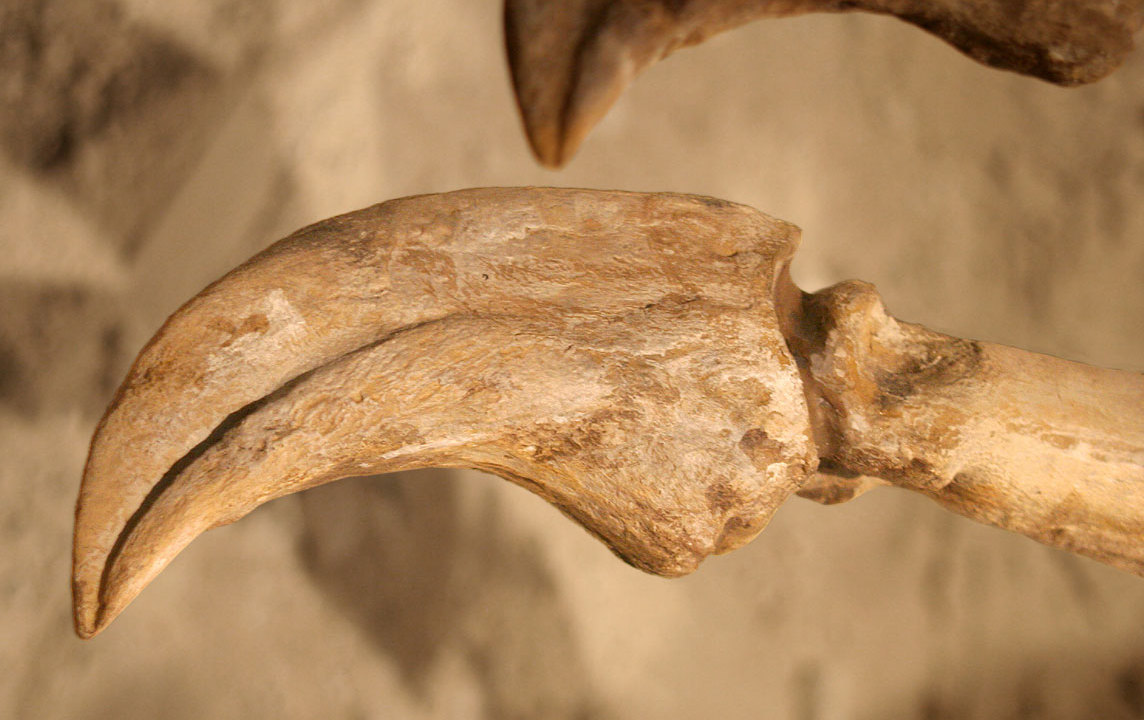
Cast of a hand-claw, showing its blunt, recurved shape

David J. Button and Zanno found in 2019 herbivorous dinosaurs mainly followed two distinct modes of feeding, either processing food in the gut – characterized by gracile skulls and low bite forces – or the mouth, characterized by features associated with extensive processing. Deinocheirus, along with ornithomimid ornithomimosaurs, diplodocoid and titanosaur sauropods, Segnosaurus, and caenagnathids, was found to be in the former category. These researchers suggested that deinocheirids and ornithomimid ornithomimosaurians such as Gallimimus had invaded these niches separately, convergently achieving relatively large sizes. Advantages from large body mass in herbivores include increased intake rate of food and fasting resistance, and these trends may therefore indicate that deinocheirids and ornithomimids were more herbivorous than other ornithomimosaurians. They cautioned that the correlations between body mass and body mass were not simple, and that there was no directional trend toward increased mass seen in the clade. Furthermore, the diet of most ornithomimosaurians is poorly-known, and Deinocheirus appears to have been at least opportunistically omnivorous.

A 2022 article by Waisum Ma and colleagues examined how feeding mechanics varied between different non-bird coelurosaurian groups through finite element analysis, revealing that they all underwent reduction of feeding-related stress in their jaws. They found that Deinocheirus showed different patterns of stress and strain distribution than other ornithomimisaurs, indicating it was a specialized feeder. They suspected Deinocheirus may have reverted to omnivory/carnivory.

Various feeding behaviours were proposed before more complete remains of Deinocheirus were known, and it was early on envisioned as a predatory, allosaur-like animal with giant arms. In their original description, Osmólska and Roniewicz found that the hands of Deinocheirus were unsuited for grasping, but could instead have been used to tear prey apart. In 1970, the Russian paleontologist Anatoly Konstantinovich Rozhdestvensky compared the forelimbs of Deinocheirus to sloths, leading him to hypothesise that Deinocheirus was a specialised climbing dinosaur, that fed on plants and animals found in trees. In 1988, Paul instead suggested that the claws were too blunt for predatory purposes, but would have been good defensive weapons. While attempting to determine the ecological niches for Deinocheirus and Therizinosaurus in 2010, Phil Senter and James H. Robins suggested that Deinocheirus had the largest vertical feeding range due to its hip height, and specialised in eating high foliage. In 2017, it was suggested that the claws of Deinocheirus were adapted for pulling large quantities of herbaceous plants out of water, and to decrease the resistance of water.

=== Palaeopathology ===
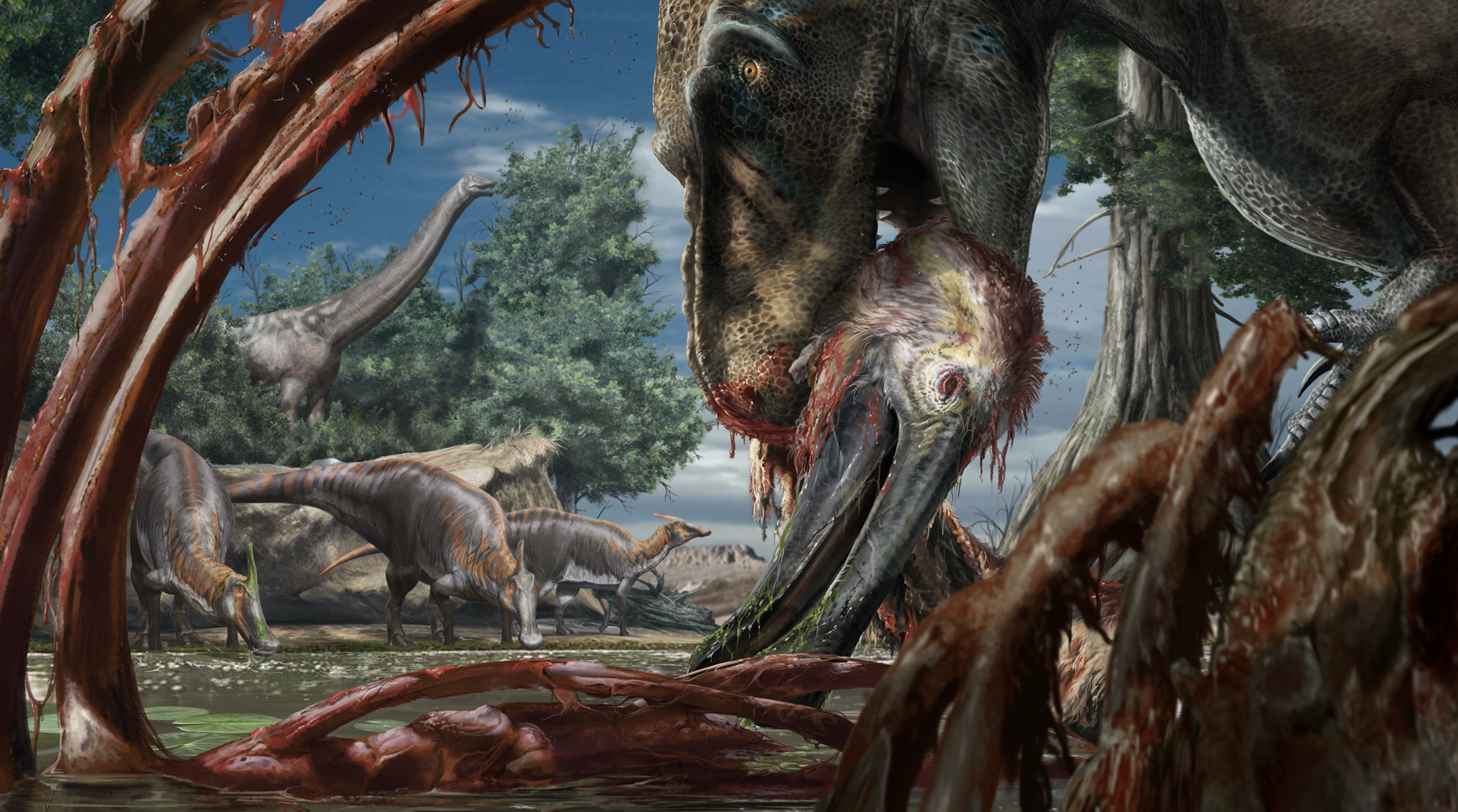
Restoration of Tarbosaurus feeding on Deinocheirus; bite marks of this tyrannosaur have been identified on Deinocheirus bones

Osmólska and Roniewicz reported palaeopathologies in the holotype specimen such as abnormal pits, grooves and tubercles on the first and second phalanx of the left second finger that may have been the result of injuries to the joint between the two bones. The damage may have caused changes to the arrangement of ligaments of muscles. The two coracoids are also differently developed. A rib of specimen MPC-D 100/127 shows a healed trauma which has remodelled the bone.

In 2012, bite marks on two gastralia of the holotype specimen were reported. The size and shape of the bite marks match the teeth of Tarbosaurus, the largest known predator from the Nemegt Formation. Various types of feeding traces were identified; punctures, gouges, striae, fragmentary teeth, and combinations of the above marks. The bite marks probably represent feeding behaviour instead of aggression between the species, and the fact that bite marks were not found elsewhere on the body indicates the predator focused on internal organs. Tarbosaurus bite marks have also been identified on hadrosaur and sauropod fossils, but theropod bite marks on bones of other theropods are very rare in the fossil record.

== Palaeoenvironment ==
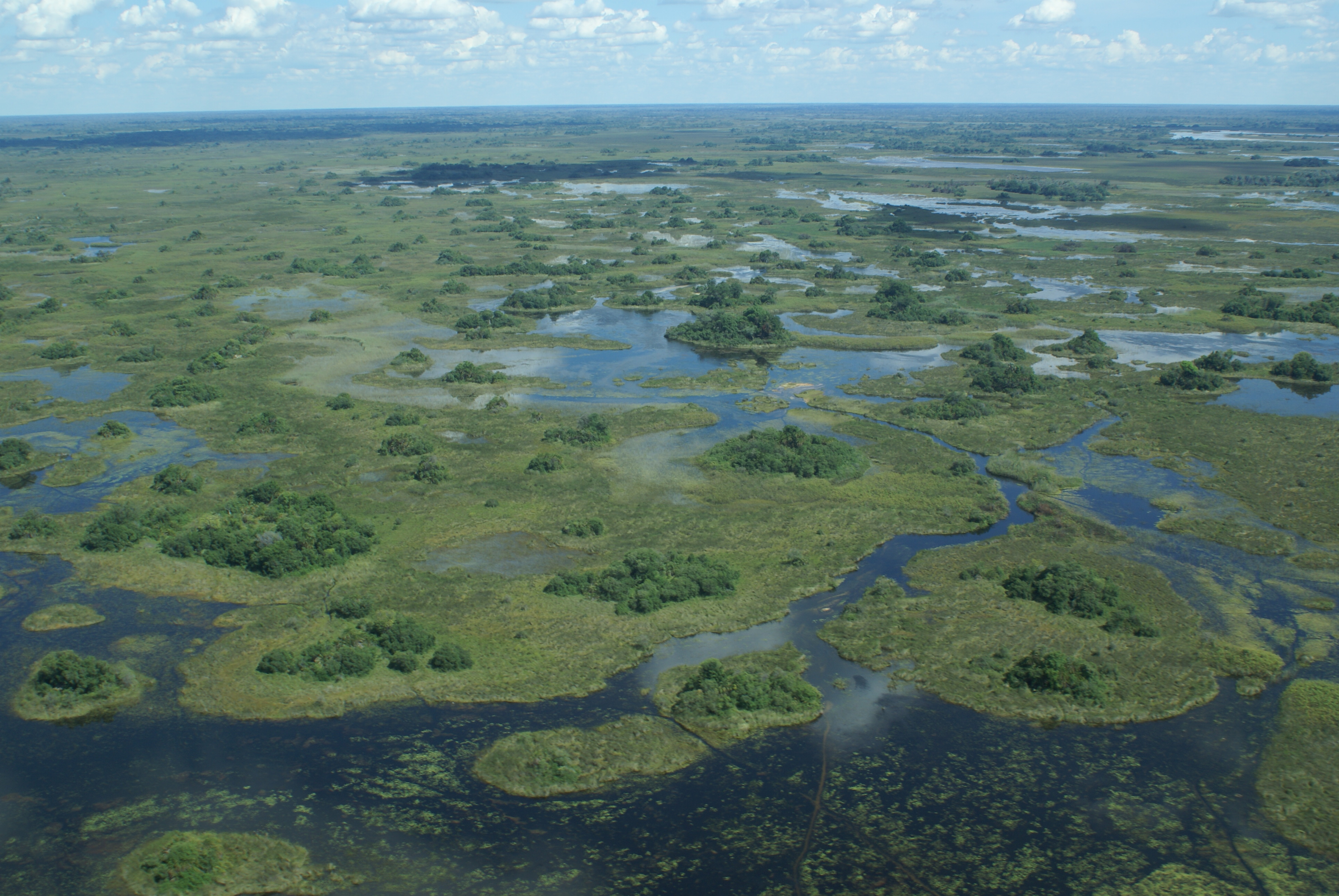
The Okavango Delta, which is similar to the environment Deinocheirus inhabited

The three known Deinocheirus specimens were recovered from the Nemegt Formation in the Gobi Desert of southern Mongolia. The Barun Goyot, Djadochta and Nemegt are stratigraphically 'jumbled'. This geologic formation has never been dated radiometrically, but the fauna present in the fossil record indicate it was probably deposited during the early Maastrichtian age, at the end of the Late Cretaceous about 70 million years ago. The rock facies of the Nemegt Formation suggest the presence of stream and river channels, mudflats, and shallow lakes. Such large river channels and soil deposits are evidence of a far more humid climate than those found in the older Barun Goyot and Djadochta formations. However, caliche deposits indicate at least periodic droughts occurred. Sediment was deposited in the channels and floodplains of large rivers.

Deinocheirus is thought to have been widely distributed within the Nemegt Formation, as the only three specimens found have been 50 km (31 mi) apart. The river systems of the Nemegt Formation provided a suitable niche for Deinocheirus with its omnivorous habits. The environment was similar to the Okavango Delta of present-day Botswana. Within this ecosystem, Deinocheirus would have eaten plants and small animals, including fish. It may have competed for trees with other large herbivorous dinosaurs such as the long-necked theropod Therizinosaurus, various titanosaurian sauropods, and the smaller hadrosaurid Saurolophus. Deinocheirus may have competed with those herbivores for higher foliage such as trees, but was also able to feed on material that they could not. Along with Deinocheirus, the discoveries of Therizinosaurus and Gigantoraptor show that three groups of herbivorous theropods (ornithomimosaurs, therizinosaurs and oviraptorosaurs), independently reached their maximum sizes in the late Cretaceous of Asia.

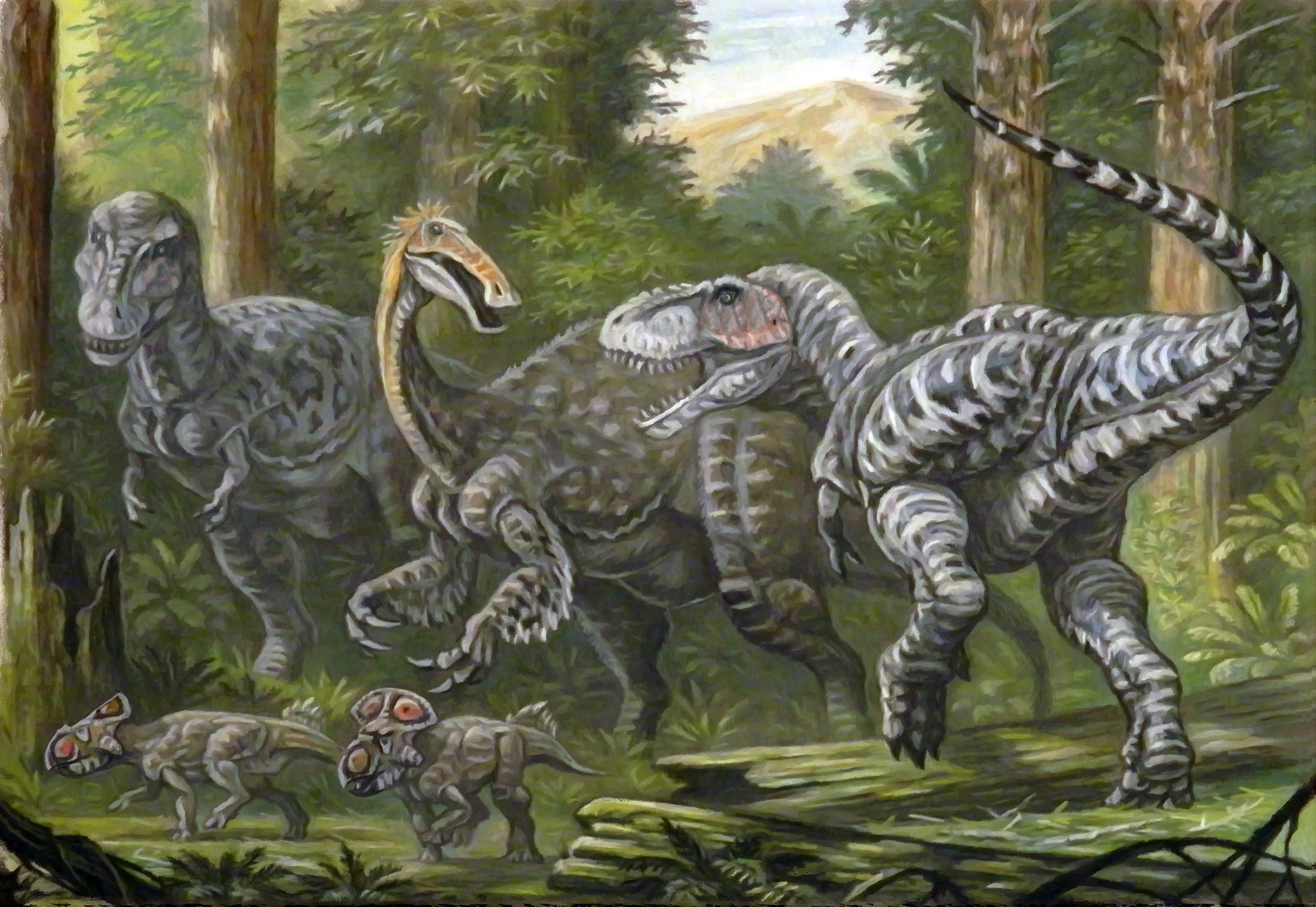
Restoration of two Tarbosaurus attacking a Deinocheirus

The habitats in and around the Nemegt rivers where Deinocheirus lived provided a home for a wide array of organisms. Occasional mollusc fossils are found, as well as a variety of other aquatic animals like fish and turtles, and the crocodylomorph Paralligator. Mammal fossils are rare in the Nemegt Formation, but many birds have been found, including the enantiornithine Gurilynia, the hesperornithiform Judinornis, as well as Teviornis, a possible Anseriform. Herbivorous dinosaurs of the Nemegt Formation include ankylosaurids such as Tarchia, the pachycephalosaurian Prenocephale, large hadrosaurids such as Saurolophus and Barsboldia, and sauropods such as Nemegtosaurus, and Opisthocoelicaudia. Predatory theropods that lived alongside Deinocheirus include tyrannosauroids such as Tarbosaurus, Alioramus, and Bagaraatan, and troodontids such as Borogovia, Tochisaurus, and Zanabazar. Theropod groups with both omnivorous and herbivorous members include therizinosaurs, such as Therizinosaurus, oviraptorosaurians, such as Elmisaurus, Nemegtomaia, and Rinchenia, and other ornithomimosaurians, such as Anserimimus and Gallimimus.

== See also ==
- Timeline of ornithomimosaur research
