= 1970 in paleontology =

Paleontology or palaeontology is the study of prehistoric life forms on Earth through the examination of plant and animal fossils. This includes the study of body fossils, tracks (ichnites), burrows, cast-off parts, fossilised feces (coprolites), palynomorphs and chemical residues. Because humans have encountered fossils for millennia, paleontology has a long history both before and after becoming formalized as a science. This article records significant discoveries and events related to paleontology that occurred or were published in the year 1970.

== Arthropods ==
=== Newly named insects ===
Name	Novelty	Status	Authors	Age	Unit	Location	Notes	Images
Aphaenogaster avita	Sp nov	Valid	Fujiyama	early - middle Miocene	Chojabaru Formation	Japan	A myrmicin ant Moved to Paraphaenogaster avita (2016)	
"Holcorpidae"	Fam nov	nomen nudum	Zherikhin	Priabonian	Florissant Formation	USA	A scorpionfly family, type sp. H. maculosa No formal description provided	

== Archosauromorphs ==
=== Newly named diapsids ===
Name	Novelty	Status	Authors	Age	Location	Notes	Images
Longisquama	fam et gen et sp nov	valid	Sharov	Middle to Late Triassic	Kyrgyzstan	possible gliding reptile covered with Feather-like Scales.	Longisquama insignis

=== Newly named dinosaurs ===
Data courtesy of George Olshevsky's dinosaur genera list.

Name	Novelty	Status	Authors	Age	Unit	Location	Notes	Images
Daspletosaurus	gen et sp nov	Valid	Russell	Late Cretaceous	Oldman Formation	Canada (Alberta); USA (Montana	A tyrannosaurine tyrannosaurid.	Daspletosaurus
Deinocheirus	fam, gen et sp nov	Valid	Osmólska & Roniewicz	late Cretaceous	Nemegt Formation	Mongolia		Deinocheirus
Dilophosaurus	gen nov	Valid	Welles	Early Jurassic	Kayenta formation	USA (Arizona)	A Two-crested Dilophosaur.	Dilophosaurus
"Likhoelesaurus"	gen et sp nov	Nomen nudum.	Ellenberger	Late Triassic	Lower Elliot Formation	South Africa	Misidentified non-dinosaurian archosaur.	
"Megadontosaurus"	gen et sp nov	Nomen nudum	Brown vide: Ostrom	Early Cretaceous	Cloverly Formation		Chimera of Deinonychus and Microvenator.	
Microvenator	gen et sp nov	Valid	Ostrom	Early Cretaceous	Cloverly Formation	USA (Montana		Microvenator celer
Sauropelta	gen et sp nov	Valid	Ostrom	Early Cretaceous	Cloverly Formation	USA (Montana, Utah and Wyoming)	a nodosaurid	Sauropelta
Staurikosaurus	gen et sp nov	Valid	Colbert	Late Triassic	Santa Maria Formation	Brazil	a herrerasaurid	Staurikosaurus
Tenontosaurus	gen et sp nov	Valid	Ostrom	Early Cretaceous	Cloverly Formation	USA (Arizona, Idaho, Maryland, Montana, Oklahoma, Texas, Utah and Wyoming)	an ornithopod. with a Long Tail.	Tenontosaurus

=== Newly named birds ===
Name	Novelty	Status	Authors	Age	Unit	Location	Notes	Images
Anabernicula robusta	Sp. nov.	jr synonym	Short	Early Pleistocene	Yarmouth Intergalcial	USA	An Anatidae, jr synonym of Brantadorna robusta	
Aquila borrasi	Sp. nov.	jr synonym	Arredondo	Pleistocene	Cave deposits	Cuba	An Accipitridae, jr synonym of Buteogallus borrasi.	
Chubutodyptes biloculata	Gen. nov. et Sp. nov.	valid	George G. Simpson	Early Miocene	Patagonian	Argentina	A Spheniscidae, this is the type species of the new genus, Carolina Acosta Hospitaleche, 2007 transferred the species to the genus Palaeospheniscus Moreno et Mercerat, 1891.	
Heterochen pratensis	Gen. nov. et Sp. nov.	valid	Lester L. Short	Early Pliocene	Valentine Formation	USA (Nebraska)	An Anatidae, this is the type species of the new genus.	
Mancalla milleri	Sp. nov.	valid	Hildegarde Howard	Middle Pliocene	Blancan, San Diego Formation	USA (California)	An Alcidae, Mancallinae.	
Primobucco mcgrewi	Gen. nov. et Sp. nov.	valid	Pierce Brodkorb	Early Eocene	Green River Formation	USA (Wyoming)	Described as a Bucconidae, Feduccia et Martin, 1976 erected the family Primobucconidae for it, this is the type species of the new genus.	
Proagriocharis kimballensis	Gen. nov. et Sp. nov.	valid	Larry D. Martin James Tate, Jr.	Late Pliocene	Kimball Formation	USA (Nebraska)	A Meleagridae, this is the type species of the new genus.	
Pseudaptenodytes macraei	Gen. nov. et Sp. nov.	valid	George G. Simpson	Late Miocene	Cheltenhamian	Australia	A Spheniscidae, this is the type species of the new genus.	
Pseudaptenodytes minor	Sp. nov.	valid	George G. Simpson	Late Miocene	Cheltenhamian	Australia	A Spheniscidae.	
Tringa antiqua	Sp. nov.	valid	J. Alan Feduccia	Late Pliocene	Hemphillian	USA (Kansas)	A Scolopacidae.	
Zonotrichia robusta	Sp. nov.	valid	Eduardo P. Tonni	Middle Pleistocene	Miramar	Argentina	A Passerellidae.	

=== Newly named Pterosaurs ===
Name	Novelty	Status	Authors	Age	Unit	Location	Notes	Images
Pterodaustro	gen et sp nov	Valid	Bonaparte	early Cretaceous	Lagarcito Formation	Argentina	a Ctenochasmatid pterodactyloid. with a Flamingo-like feeding style.	Pterodaustro guinazui
