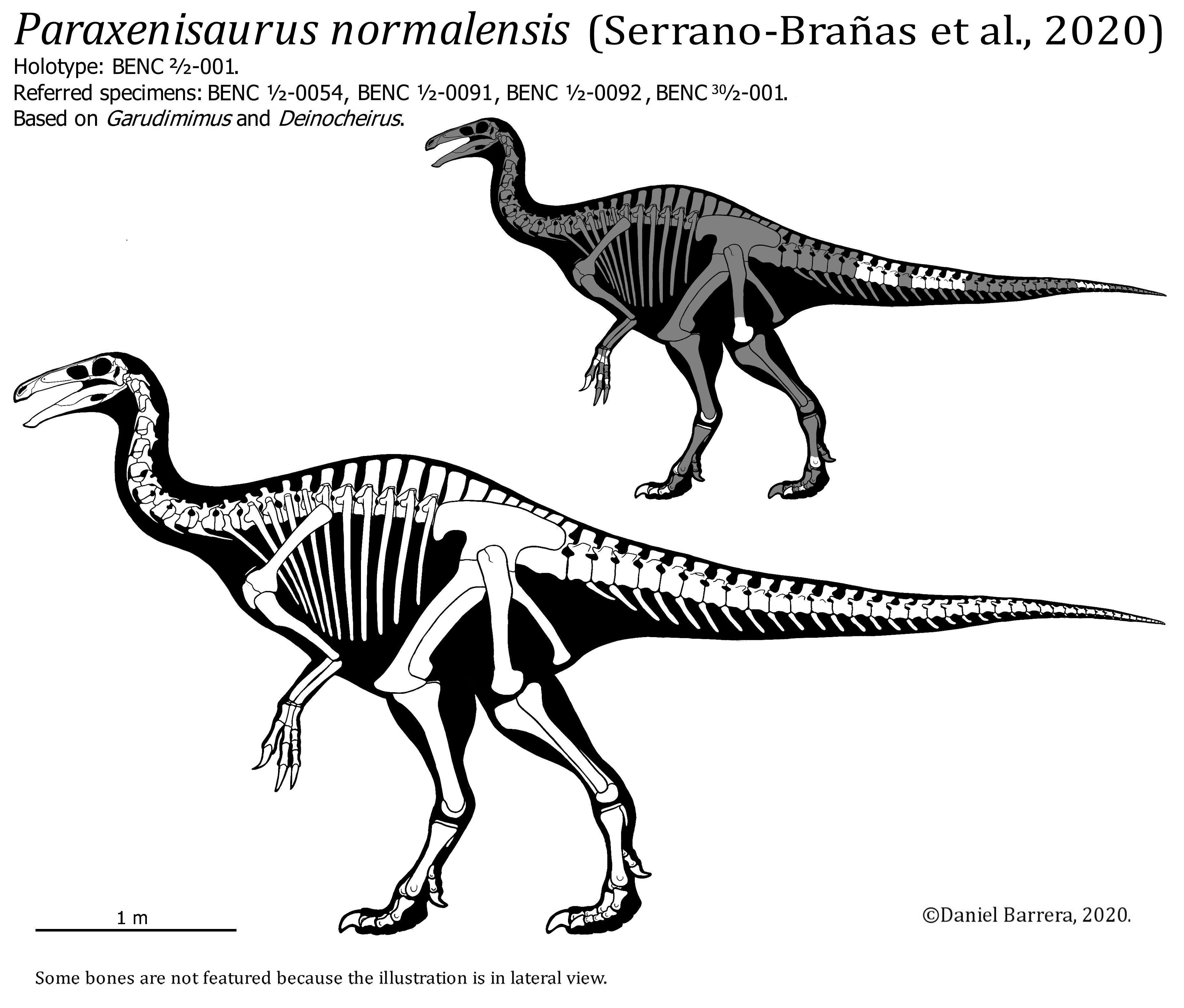
- Skeletal diagram of the holotype (top) with a hypothetical complete skeleton (bottom)

Scientific classification
- Kingdom: Animalia
- Phylum: Chordata
- Class: Reptilia
- Clade: Dinosauria
- Clade: Saurischia
- Clade: Theropoda
- Clade: †Ornithomimosauria
- Family: †Deinocheiridae
- Genus: †Paraxenisaurus; Serrano-Brañas et al., 2020

Type species
- †Paraxenisaurus normalensis Serrano-Brañas et al., 2020

= Paraxenisaurus =

Paraxenisaurus Temporal range: Late Cretaceous ~74 to 73 Ma - Upper Campanian

Genus of deinocheirid dinosaur (fossil)

Paraxenisaurus (/pɛərəkˌsɪniːˈsɔːrəs/, meaning "strange lizard") is an extinct genus of ornithomimosaurian theropod from the Late Cretaceous Cerro del Pueblo Formation of Coahuila in Mexico. The genus contains a single species, P. normalensis, which is known from a few bones of tail, hips, hands, and feet. The specific epithet was given in honor of the Benemérita Normal School of Coahuila, a teacher training institution, where the fossils were reposited. It is a member of the family Deinocheiridae and is the only member of that clade known from Laramidia.

== Discovery ==
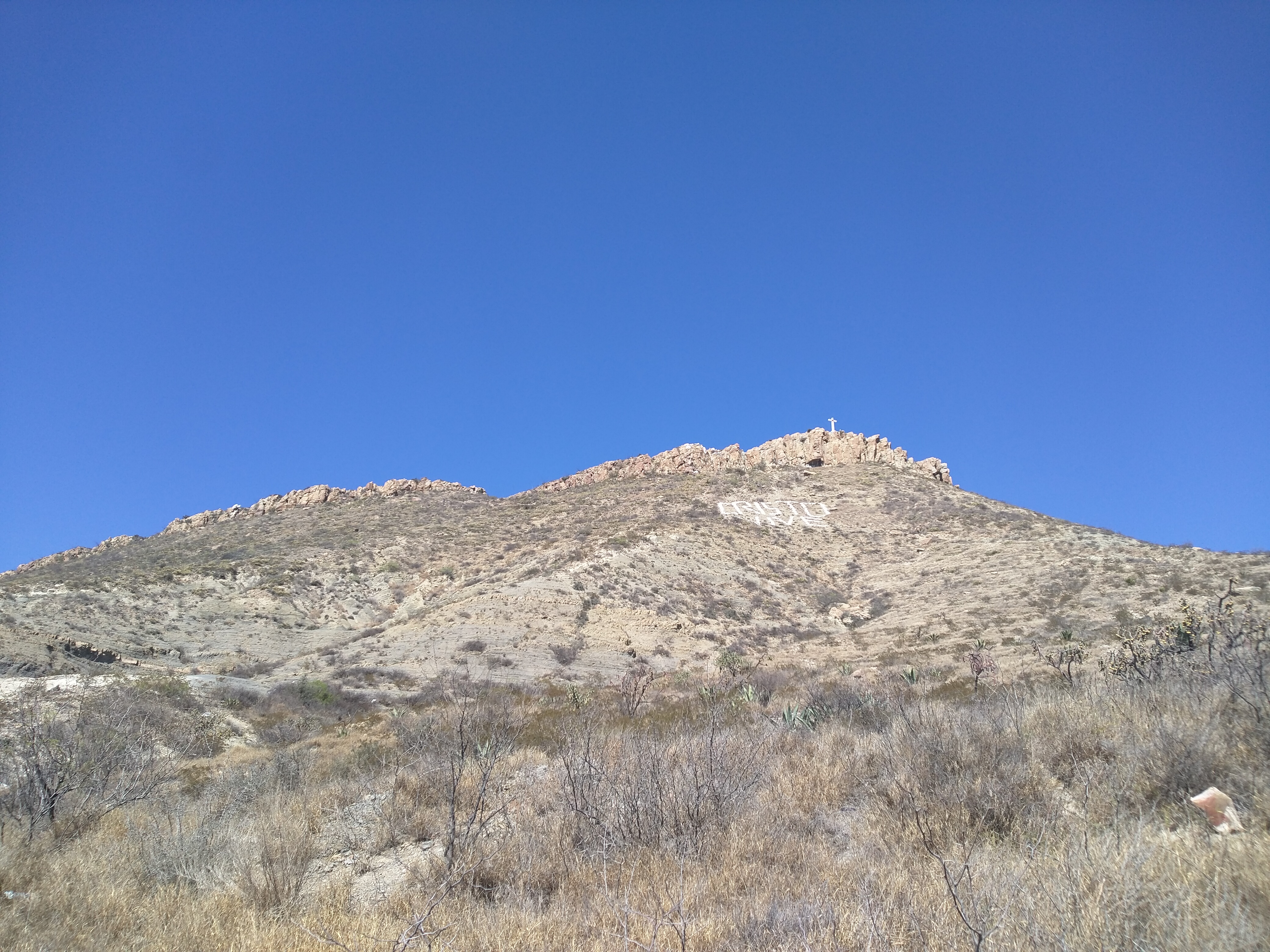
An outcrop of the Cerro del Pueblo Formation, where Paraxenisaurus was found

During the 1990s, ornithomimosaur fossils were discovered at three sites in the Cerro del Pueblo Formation of Coahuila state. The known specimens of Paraxenisaurus were collected from three different localities near the towns of Parras de la Fuente and General Cepeda. Two decades later, these remains were identified as belonging to a distinct North American ornithomimosaur taxon. In 2020, they were named and described by Mexican paleontologists Claudia Inés Serrano-Brañas, Belinda Espinosa-Chávez, Sarah Augusta Maccracken, Cirene Gutiérrez-Blando, Claudio de León-Dávila and José Flores Ventura.

The holotype specimen of Paraxenisaurus was given the designation BENC ^{2}/_{2}-001 and was stored at the Normal School of Coahuila. It consists of a manual phalanx, an astragalus, a calcaneum, and several bones of the feet including a partial metatarsal, several pedal phalanges, and unguals. Four additional specimens were referred to the genus and consist of various partial bones of the hands and feet in addition to a partial femur, and several caudal vertebrae. Each named specimen consists of several bones that were disarticulated when they were found. However, the authors of the description stated that all the bones of each specimen were found in association with one another and were almost certainly from the same animal.

== Description ==
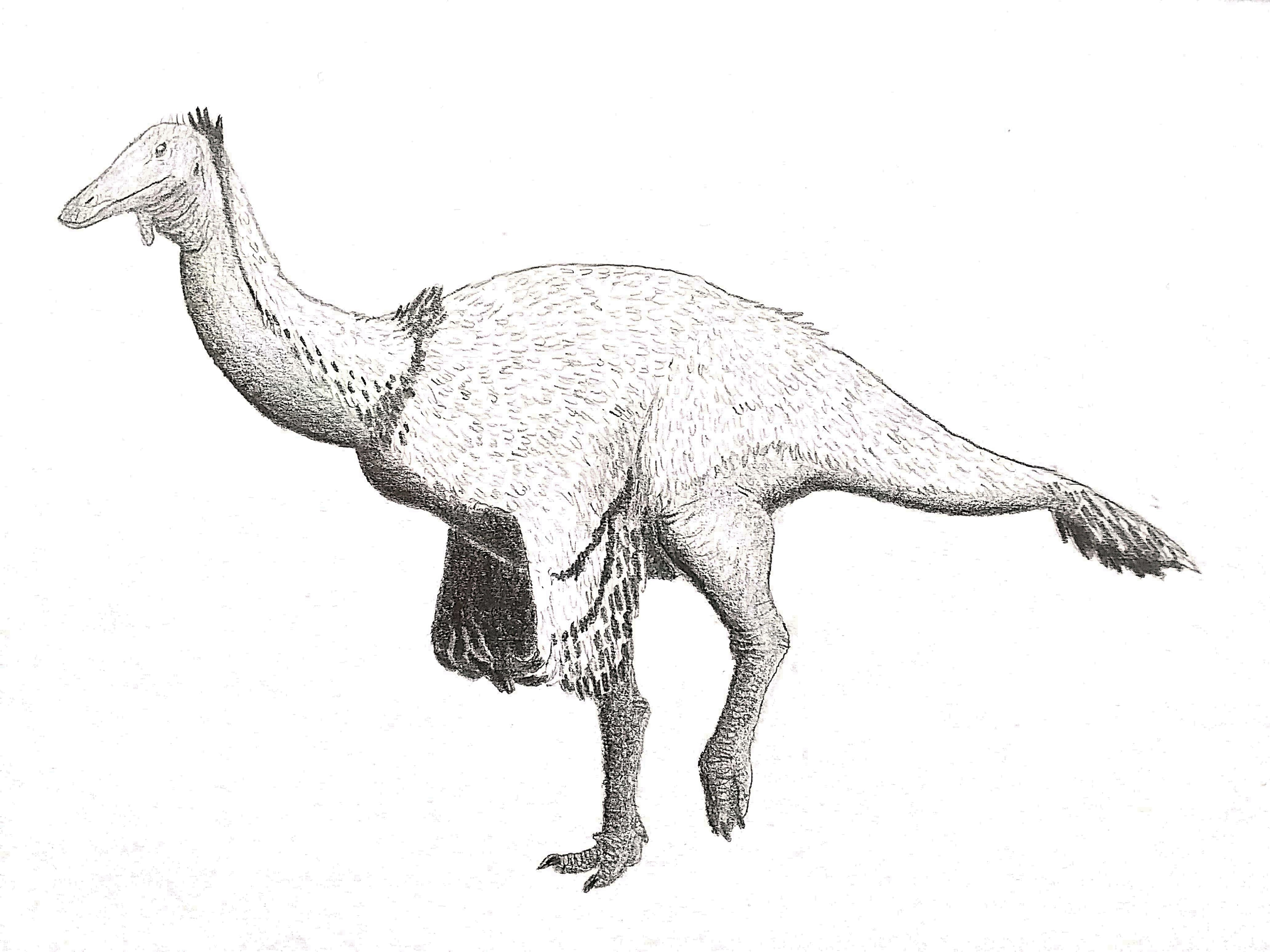
Hypothetical life reconstruction of Paraxenisaurus based on Deinocheirus and Beishanlong

The known remains of Paraxenisaurus are highly incomplete, and it is not known how ontogenetically old the known specimens were when they died and became fossilized, so making an accurate estimate of their full size in life is very difficult. The authors who described the fossils estimated that Paraxenisaurus was about 5.7 metres (19 ft) long and weighed about 600 kilograms (1,300 lb). They suggested this based on the size estimates for the similarly-sized and more completely known genus Beishanlong, which is believed to be a close relative.

The holotype specimen, BENC ^{2}/_{2}-001, is relatively fragmentary, but it preserves enough detail to identify Paraxenisaurus as a genus of deinocheirid. Serrano-Brañas and colleagues diagnosed the genus by the following autapomorphies: a deep, concave, elliptical surface on the articular surface of the claw on the first finger, vertically-oriented articulations between the prezygapophyses on the anterior caudal vertebrae, ventromedially-oriented prezygapophyses on the caudal vertebrae, a large flared condyle of the second metatarsal, and a rounded foramen on the medial surface of the toe claws. Paraxenisaurus also lacks the arctometatarsalian condition seen in many other ornithomimosaurs. They also noticed several apomorphic features which are not unique to Paraxenisaurus itself. These synapomorphies include: laterally-compressed hand claws with a deep sulcus along the flexor tubercle, a proximally-expanded articular surface of the third metacarpal, the presence of a first pedal digit, a semi-ginglymoid distal articular surface of the third metatarsal, and broad, strongly curved toe claws with enlarged and vertical proximodorsal processes.

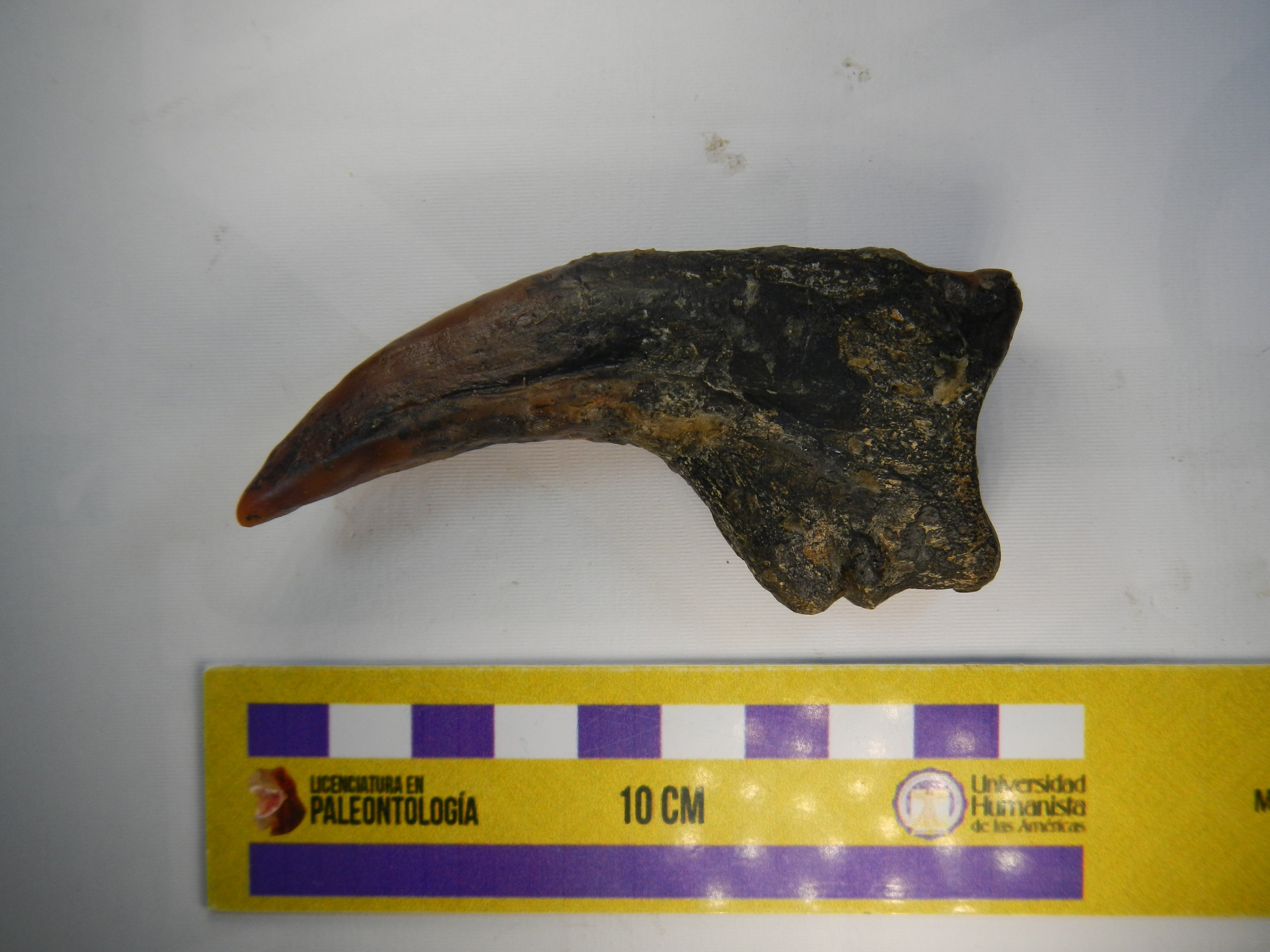
One of the manual claws of Paraxenisaurus with a ruler for scale

Several other specimens were found at nearby localities. These include BENC ^{1}/_{2}-0054 (a few metacarpal and phalanx elements), BENC ^{1}/_{2}-0091 (part of a femur, several toe fragments, and vertebrae), BENC ^{1}/_{2}-0092 (caudal vertebrae), BENC ^{30}/_{2}-001 (two pedal unguals). The quality of their preservation varies considerably between the specimens. While these elements were described in detail by Serrano-Brañas and colleagues, they were not used to diagnose the genus.

Paraxenisaurus had distinct morphology from many other ornithomimosaurs in several regards. Their caudal vertebrae were highly elongated in comparison with most other ornithomimosaurs, with only Gallimimus and Beishanlong exhibiting a similar condition. The anterior portion of the tail of Paraxenisaurus was also likely quite stiff and rod-like in comparison with related taxa and it likely had very little dorsoventral mobility based on the articulation of the zygapophyses. The metatarsals of Paraxenisaurus are also distinct from most of its relatives due to the full articulation of the third metatarsal with the tibia. This is the plesiomorphic condition for coelurosaurs, but most ornithomimosaurs possess an arctometatarsus. The only ones which do not, besides Paraxenisaurus, are Deinocheirus, Nqwebasaurus, and Beishanlong. Paraxenisaurus also retains the first pedal digit, which is also seen in Nqwebasaurus, Garudimimus, and Beishanlong. Serrano-Brañas and colleagues also noted that Paraxenisaurus has numerous morphological similarities to an unnamed taxon from the Dinosaur Park Formation, known only as TMP 1967.19.14.

== Classification ==
In their 2020 description of Paraxenisaurus, Serrano-Brañas and colleagues conducted a phylogenetic analysis of ornithomimosaurs using the data set developed by Jonah Choiniere and colleagues in 2012 combined with character information compiled by Hans Dieter-Sues and Alexander Averianov in 2016. Their analysis included 103 taxa coded for 568 characters, including most named ornithomimosaur taxa.

In their analysis, they were able to assign Paraxenisaurus to ornithomimosauria based on the following synapomorphies: an expanded medial surface on the distal and of the third metatarsal, a dorsoventrally thick shaft of the fourth metatarsal, a small flexor tubercle of the hand claws, shallow extensor pits for ligaments on the dorsal surface of the phalanges, toe claws with a triangular cross-section, and a pronounced fossa on the ventral surface of the toe claws. They also recovered the new genus within a monophyletic Deinocheiridae. They made this assignment based on several similarities in the morphology of the pedal unguals and phalanges between Paraxenisaurus, Deinocheirus, and Garudimimus. Their analysis differed from previous analyses such as that from Yuong-Nam Lee and colleagues in 2014 in that they recovered Beishanlong as a basal ornithomimosaur outside Deinocheiridae in a polytomy with Pelecanimimus and Shenzhousaurus. They also recovered Harpymimus as a deinocheirid, in a more basal position than Deinocheirus, Paraxenisaurus, and Garudimimus. This was consistent with the results of Dieter-Sues and Averianov (2016). An abbreviated version of the consensus tree they provide can be seen below.

- Maniraptoriformes
  - Maniraptora
    - Alvarezsauroidea
    - - Paraves
      - - Oviraptorosauria
        - Therizinosauroidea
  - Ornithomimosauria
    - Nqwebasaurus
    - - Beishanlong
      - Pelecanimimus
      - Shenzhousaurus
      - - Deinocheiridae
          - Harpymimus
          - - Deinocheirus
            - Garudimimus
            - Paraxenisaurus
        - Ornithomimidae
          - Archaeornithomimus asiaticus
          - - Dzharacursor
            - - Sinornithomimus
              - - Gallimimus
                - - Struthiomimus
                  - - Qiupalong
                    - - Anserimimus
                      - Ornithomimus

The most recent phylogenetic analysis to be conducted which included Paraxenisaurus was the one published by Soki Hattori and colleagues in 2023 in their description of the new genus Tyrannomimus. Their analysis was compiled from most of the same data, and they obtained the same results with respect to Deinocheiridae. They found Harpymimus as being basal to a polytomy which included Deinocheirus, Garudimimus, and Paraxenisaurus, but not Beishanlong, which has been previously recovered as a member of Deinocheiridae.

== Paleoecology ==
=== Coexistence with other ornithomimosaurs ===
Paraxenisaurus is the first ornithomimosaur to be named from the Cerro del Pueblo Formation, but several specimens from the area are known which are believed to be distinct taxa. Most ornithomimosaur material is only known from individual pedal unguals or fragments of femora or caudal vertebrae. A large portion of this material is more slender or lightweight than the holotype or referred specimens of Paraxenisaurus. It is difficult to determine if these elements are from unique taxa or juvenile Paraxenisaurus individuals, so the precise ecological diversity of the ornithomimosaur fauna of the Cerro del Pueblo Formation remains uncertain pending further study. However, several of the morphological differences between the unnamed specimens and referred specimens of Paraxenisaurus are believed to relate to characteristics which are not a result of ontogeny, such as the proximal processes on the unguals.

=== Paleoenvironment ===
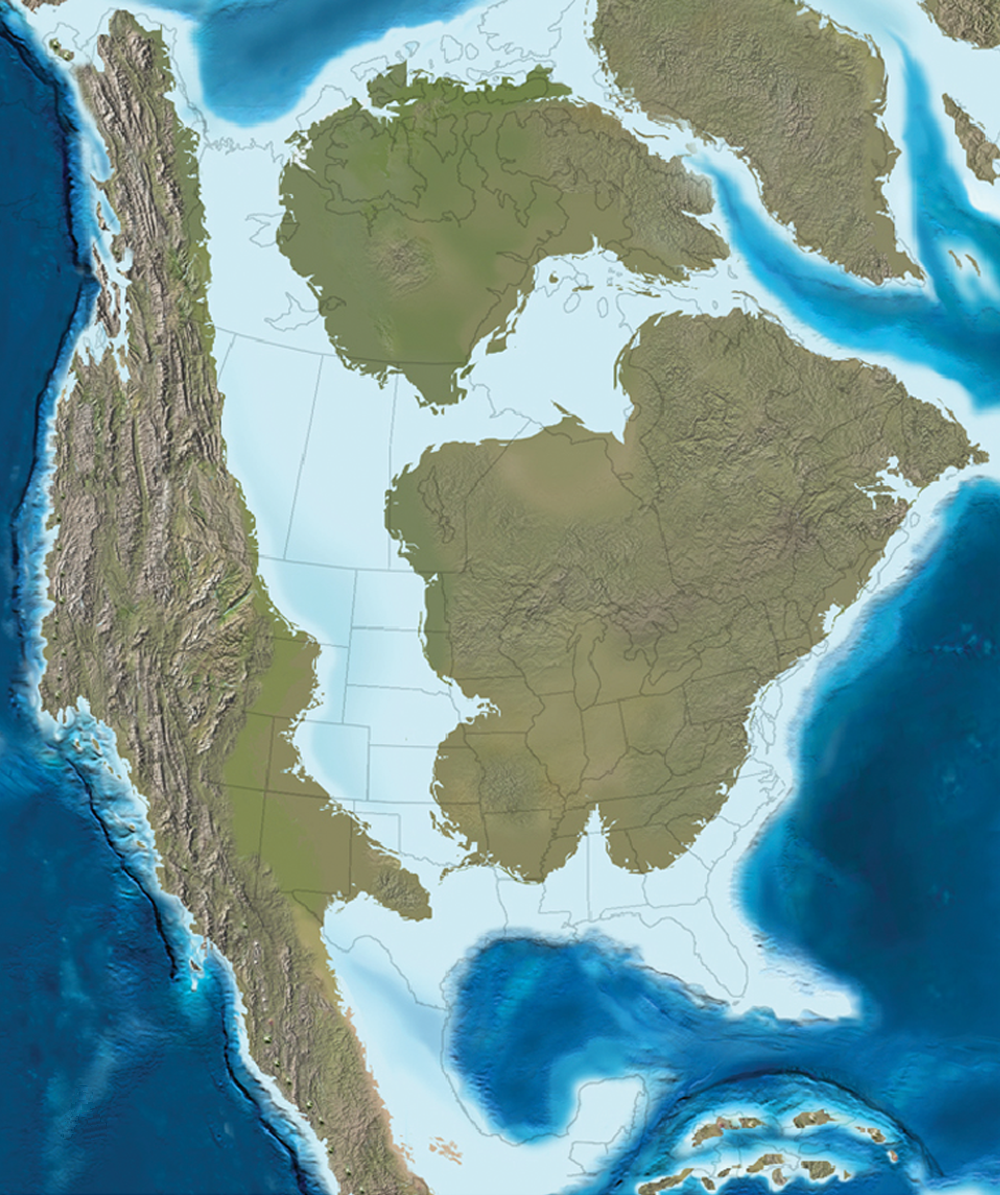
A reconstruction of North America during the Campanian

The Cerro del Pueblo Formation is the oldest member of the Difunta Group, which is believed to have been deposited in the Campanian. It is primarily made up of alternating layers of siltstones, sandstones, and gray shales. These rocks preserve fluvial, lacustrine, coastal, and shallow marine ecosystems. The shale layers primarily preserve marine invertebrates such as ammonites and gastropods and they interbedded with sandstone and siltstone layers, suggesting that sea levels were fluctuating over the time that the formation was deposited. The terrestrial deposits, in which Paraxenisaurus was found, are believed to represent a coastal floodplain on the margin of an estuary. The presence of a diverse array of crocodiles, turtles, and freshwater bivalves suggests a heavily vegetated riverine ecosystem. The abundance of dinosaur teeth and bone fragments also suggests that the region was replete with vegetation and supported a diverse assemblage of megafauna.

=== Contemporary fauna ===
Dinosaur remains are abundant in the Cerro del Pueblo Formation, but most of the known remains are very incomplete. Many of these dinosaurs are known only from teeth, and are therefore very difficult to assign to any specific genera. Teeth from theropods are very common and have shown that tyrannosaurids, dromaeosaurids, troodontids, and caenagnathids lived in this environment in addition to the above mentioned ornithomimosaurs.

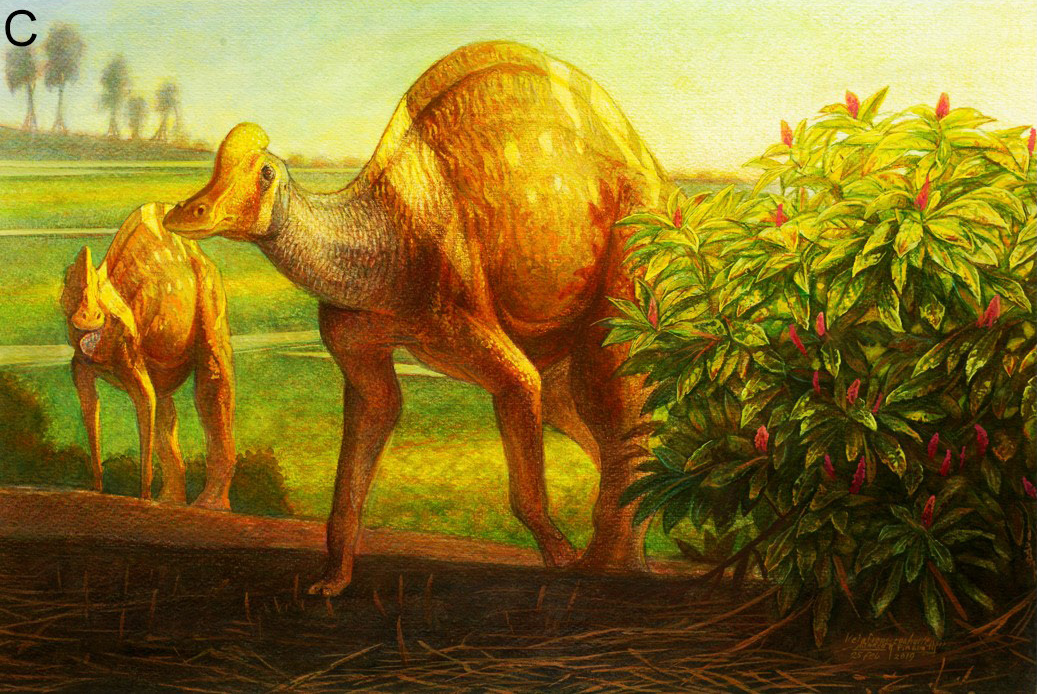
A reconstruction of Velafrons in the environment of the Cerro del Pueblo Formation

Ornithischians were also common and diverse in the ecosystem, much like the contemporaneous Dinosaur Park, Two Medicine, Kaiparowits, and Kirtland formations. Hadrosaur remains are the most common dinosaur fossil material found in the Cerro del Pueblo, being known from vertebrae, limb bones, jawbones, teeth, and shoulder bones. Some of these taxa have been named and described, such as Tlatolophus, Velafrons, and Latirhinus, but most remains have yet to be formally named or described, and additional species may have existed. For example, some hadrosaur specimens have been referred to the genus Kritosaurus, which is also known from Texas and New Mexico around the same time. Ankylosaurs are represented by several unnamed taxa, and ceratopsids like Coahuilaceratops are known to have coexisted with both chasmosaurines and centrosaurines. Fossilized footprints from some kind of pterosaur are also known from this formation.

Like most fluvial sediments from the Campanian of Laramidia, the Cerro del Pueblo Formation was home to a wide array of turtles including pleurodires, paracryptodires, cheloniids, kinosternids, and trionychids. These would have coexisted with both goniopholids and eusuchian crocodyliformes in both freshwater and saltwater environments. There is also some evidence of snakes from this environment. Microfossils have also preserved gastropods, ammonites, bivalves, and other invertebrates.

== See also ==
- 2020 in archosaur paleontology
- Appalachia and Laramidia
- North American land vertebrate ages
- Timeline of ornithomimosaur research
