= EAVP =

The European Association of Vertebrate Palaeontologists (EAVP) is a society for the advancement of vertebrate palaeontology in Europe.

== EAVP ==
The European Association of Vertebrate Palaeontologists (EAVP) was founded in 2003 for individuals with an interest in vertebrate palaeontology. EAVP currently has over 100 members, the vast majority of them professional vertebrate palaeontologists. EAVP understands itself as a forum for palaeontologists in a traditionally multilingual and multicultural area, defining "Europe" not in a political, but in a geographical and cultural meaning. EAVP is legally based in Germany.

== Aims ==
EAVP's aim are to

- launch and support international projects in the field of vertebrate palaeontology with a European contribution
- encourage and assist students to take part in such projects to create an improved source of future vertebrate palaeontologists
- set up or organise funds from European foundations and other sponsors
- maintain a plurality of methods
- encourage contacts and collaboration between European vertebrate palaeontologists by supporting each year the organisation of the Workshop of the EAVP in a different European country, in a historical continuity of the European Workshop on Vertebrate Palaeontology.

== Workshops and annual meetings ==
EAVP hosts a yearly workshop in different European locations. For the 200th birthday of Charles Darwin EAVP additionally hosted an Extraordinary Meeting at the Royal Belgian Institute of Natural Sciences.

Annual Meetings of the European Association of Vertebrate Palaeontologists:

- 16th: Caparica, Portugal, 26 June – 1 July 2018
- 15th: Munich, Germany: 31 July – 5 August 2017
- 14th: Haarlem, The Netherlands: 6–10 July 2016
- 13th: Opole, Poland: 8–12 July 2015
- 12th: Torino, northwest Italy: 24–28 June 2014
- 11th: Villers-sur-Mer, France: 10–15 June 2013
- 10th: Teruel, Spain: 19–24 June 2012
- 9th: Heraklion, Crete, Greece: 14–19 June 2011
- 8th: Aix-en-Provence, France: 7–12 June 2010
- 7th: Berlin, Germany: 20–24 July 2009
- 6th: Spiská Nová Ves, Slovakia: 30 June – 5 July 2008
- 5th: Carcassonne, France: 15–19 May 2007
- 4th: Budapest, Hungary: 10–15 July 2006
- 3rd: Darmstadt, Germany: 18–23 July 2005
- 2nd: Brno, Czech Republic: 19–24 July 2004
- 1st: Basel, Switzerland: 15–19 July 2003

Annual meeting of the European Workshop of Vertebrate Paleontology

- 7th: Sibiu, Romania: 2–7 July 2002
- 6th: Firenze, Italy: 19–22 September 2001
- 5th: Karlsruhe, Germany: 27 June – 1 July 2000
- 4th: Albarracín, Spain: 8–12 June 1999
- 3rd: Maastricht, The Netherlands: 6–9 May
- 2nd: Espéranza, France: 7–10 May 1997
- 1st: Copenhagen, Denmark: 1–4 May 1996

== Publications ==
EAVP's official journal is the peer-reviewed palaeontological journal Oryctos, which publishes French or English peer-reviewed original contributions on all aspects of Vertebrate Palaeontology and Comparative anatomy, as well as papers dealing with the history of those scientific disciplines.

For each EAVP workshop an abstract volume is published.

== Funds ==
With the Raymonde Rivoallan Fund EAVP has established a fund that contributes travel funding for two students each year for participation in the EAVP workshops.
