= Halszka Osmólska =

Polish paleontologist (1930–2008)

- Born: 15 September 1930; Poznań, Poland
- Died: 31 March 2008 (aged 77); Poland
- Education: University of Warsaw; Adam Mickiewicz University
- Occupation: Paleontologist
- Scientific career
- Author abbrev. (zoology): Osmólska

Halszka Osmólska (15 September 1930 – 31 March 2008) was a Polish paleontologist who specialised in Mongolian dinosaurs.

== Early life, family and education ==
Osmólska was born in 1930 in Poznań. In 1949, she began to study biology at Faculty of Biology and Earth Sciences of the University of Poznań. Thereafter, she studied at the University of Warsaw, graduating in 1955.

== Career ==
Osmólska worked at the Institute of Paleobiology of the Polish Academy of Sciences (PAN). Between 1983 and 1988, she served as the institute's director.

She was a member of the Polish–Mongolian expeditions to the Gobi Desert (1963–1965, 1967–1971), and she described many finds from these rocks, often with Teresa Maryańska.

Among the dinosaurs she described:

- Deinocheirus (1967), with Ewa Roniewicz
- Gallimimus (1972), with Roniewicz and Rinchen Barsbold
- Pachycephalosauria (1974), with Maryańska
- Bagaceratops (1975), with Maryańska
- Barsboldia (1981), with Maryańska
- Elmisaurus (and Elmisauridae) (1981)
- Hulsanpes (1982)
- Borogovia (1987)
- Bagaraatan (1996)
- Homalocephale, with Maryańska
- Prenocephale, with Maryańska
- Tylocephale, with Maryańska
- Goyocephale (1982), with Maryańska and Altangerel Perle
- Tochisaurus (1991), with Kurzanov
- Nomingia (2000), with several others

Her other work included discussions of the paleobiology of hadrosaurids, and co-editing the two editions of The Dinosauria.

She is recognised for her work in the names of the Mongolian oviraptorid Citipati osmolskae, the Chinese dromaeosaurid Velociraptor osmolskae, the Mongolian dromaeosaurid Halszkaraptor escuilliei, the archosauriform reptile Osmolskina czatkowicensis, and the Polish Pliocene lagomorph Prolagus osmolskae.

Osmólska was, in recognition of her scientific work, a recipient of a number of awards including the Polish Cross of Merit.

== Selected publications ==
- H. Osmólska and E. Roniewicz (1970). Deinocheiridae, a new family of theropod dinosaurs. Palaeontologica Polonica 21:5-19.
- H. Osmólska, E. Roniewicz, and R. Barsbold (1972). A new dinosaur, Gallimimus bullatus n. gen., n. sp. (Ornithomimidae) from the Upper Cretaceous of Mongolia. Palaeontologia Polonica 27:103-143.
- H. Osmólska (1972). Preliminary note on a crocodilian from the Upper Cretaceous of Mongolia. Palaeontologia Polonica 27:43-47.
- T. Maryańska and H. Osmólska (1974). Pachycephalosauria, a new suborder of ornithischian dinosaurs. Palaeontologia Polonica 30:45-102.
- T. Maryańska and H. Osmólska (1975). Protoceratopsidae (Dinosauria) of Asia. Palaeontologica Polonica 33:133-181.
- H. Osmólska (1976). New light on the skull anatomy and systematic position of Oviraptor. Nature 262:683-684.
- H. Osmólska (1981). Coossified tarsometatarsi in theropod dinosaurs and their bearing on the problem of bird origins. Palaeontologica Polonica 42:79-95.
- T. Maryańska and H. Osmólska (1981). First lambeosaurine dinosaur from the Nemegt Formation, Upper Cretaceous, Mongolia. Acta Palaeontologica Polonica 26(3-1):243-255.
- T. Maryańska and H. Osmólska (1981). Cranial anatomy of Saurolophus angustirostris with comments on the Asian Hadrosauridae (Dinosauria). Palaeontologia Polonica 42:5-24.
- H. Osmólska (1982). Hulsanpes perlei n.g. n.sp. (Deinonychosauria, Saurischia, Dinosauria) from the Upper Cretaceous Barun Goyot Formation of Mongolia. Neues Jahrbuch für Geologie und Paläontologie - Monatshefte 1982(7):440-448.
- A. Perle, T. Maryańska, and H. Osmólska (1982). Goyocephale lattimorei gen. et sp. n., a new flat-headed pachycephalosaur (Ornithischia, Dinosauria) from the Upper Cretaceous of Mongolia. Acta Palaeontologica Polonica 27(1-4):115-127.
- T. Maryańska and H. Osmólska (1984). Postcranial anatomy of Saurolophus angustirostris with comments on other hadrosaurs. Palaeontologia Polonica 46:119-141.
- T. Maryańska and H. Osmólska (1985). On ornithischian phylogeny. Acta Palaeontologica Polonica 30(3-4):137-149.
- H. Osmólska (1987). Borogovia gracilicrus gen. et sp. n., a new troodontid dinosaur from the Late Cretaceous of Mongolia. Acta Palaeontologica Polonica 32(1-2):133-150.
- R. Barsbold, H. Osmólska, and S.M. Kurzanov (1987). On a new troodontid (Dinosauria, Theropoda) from the Early Cretaceous of Mongolia. Acta Palaeontologica Polonica 32(1-2):121-132.
- S. M. Kurzanov and H. Osmólska (1991). Tochisaurus nemegtensis gen. et sp. n., a new troodontid dinosaur (Dinosauria, Theropoda) from Mongolia. Acta Palaeontologica Polonica 36(1):69-76.
- H. Osmólska (1996). An unusual theropod dinosaur from the Late Cretaceous Nemegt Formation of Mongolia. Acta Palaeontologica Polonica 41(1):1-38.
- R. Barsbold and H. Osmólska (1999). The skull of Velociraptor (Theropoda) from the Late Cretaceous of Mongolia. Acta Palaeontologica Polonica 44(2):189-219.
- R. Barsbold, H. Osmólska, M. Watabe, P.J. Currie, and K. Tsogtbaatar (2000). A new oviraptorosaur (Dinosauria, Theropoda) from Mongolia: the first dinosaur with a pygostyle. Acta Palaeontologica Polonica 45(2):97-106.
- T. Maryańska, H. Osmólska, and M. Wolsan (2002). Avialan status for Oviraptorosauria. Acta Palaeontologica Polonica 47(1):97-116.
- H. Osmólska, P.J. Currie, and R. Barsbold (2004). Oviraptorosauria. In: D.B. Weishampel, P. Dodson, and H. Osmólska (eds.), The Dinosauria (second edition). University of California Press, Berkeley 165-183.
