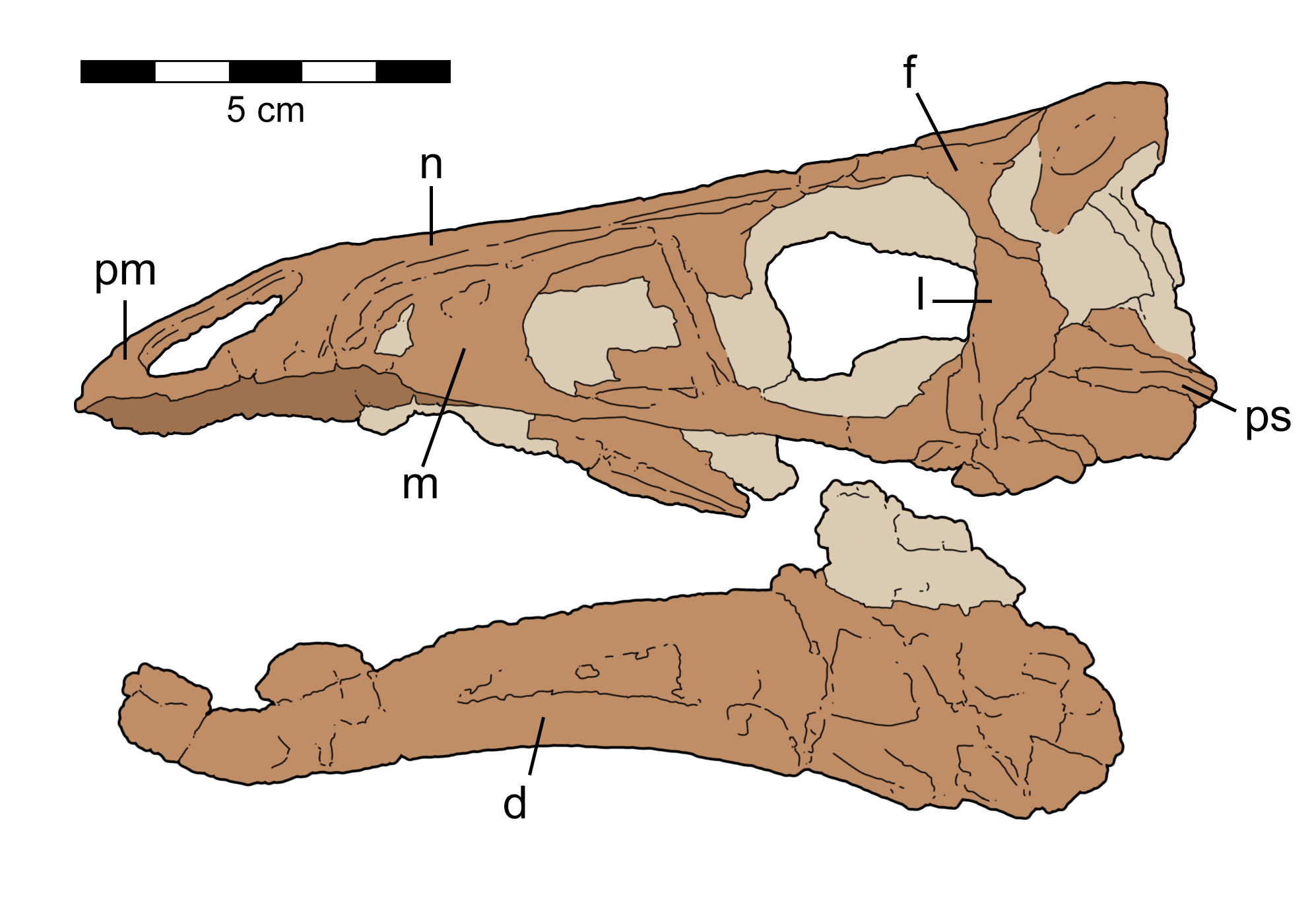
- Skull diagram of ROM 1790

Scientific classification
- Kingdom: Animalia
- Phylum: Chordata
- Class: Reptilia
- Clade: Dinosauria
- Clade: Saurischia
- Clade: Theropoda
- Clade: †Ornithomimosauria
- Family: †Ornithomimidae
- Genus: †Rativates; McFeeters et al., 2016

Type species
- †Rativates evadens McFeeters et al., 2016

= Rativates =

Rativates Temporal range: Late Cretaceous, 77–75 Ma

Extinct genus of dinosaurs

Rativates is a genus of ornithomimid theropod dinosaur from the Campanian-aged (Late Cretaceous) Dinosaur Park Formation of Alberta, Canada. The type species is Rativates evadens.

== Discovery and naming ==
In 1934, Levi Sternberg discovered the skeleton of a small ornithomimid at Quarry N° 028 near the Red Deer River in the area of the present Dinosaur Provincial Park in Canada. In 1950, he considered it a specimen of Struthiomimus. In 1972, Dale Alan Russell formally referred this specimen to Struthiomimus altus; he partly based his reconstruction of S. altus on the skull of the specimen. The remainder of the skeleton was not described until 2016.

In 2016, the type species Rativates evadens was named and described by Bradley McFeeters, Michael J. Ryan, Claudia Schröder-Adams and Thomas M. Cullen. The generic name is derived from the Latin ratis, "raft", in reference to the bird group ratites, and vates, "seer", as the ornithomimids seemingly foretold the future existence of the ratites they resembled. The specific name evadens means "evading" in Latin, referring to the ability of the swift-running animal to evade predators and to its eighty year evasion of being recognised as a separate species.

The holotype, ROM 1790, was found in a layer of the lower Dinosaur Park Formation, dating to the late Campanian. It consists of a partial skeleton, including the snout, the front lower jaws, the last back vertebra, six sacral vertebrae, sixteen front tail vertebrae that may or may not have formed a natural series, the complete pelvis, and the hindlimbs (minus the right toes). Many of the bones are damaged and compressed. It is part of the collection of the Royal Ontario Museum.

== Description ==
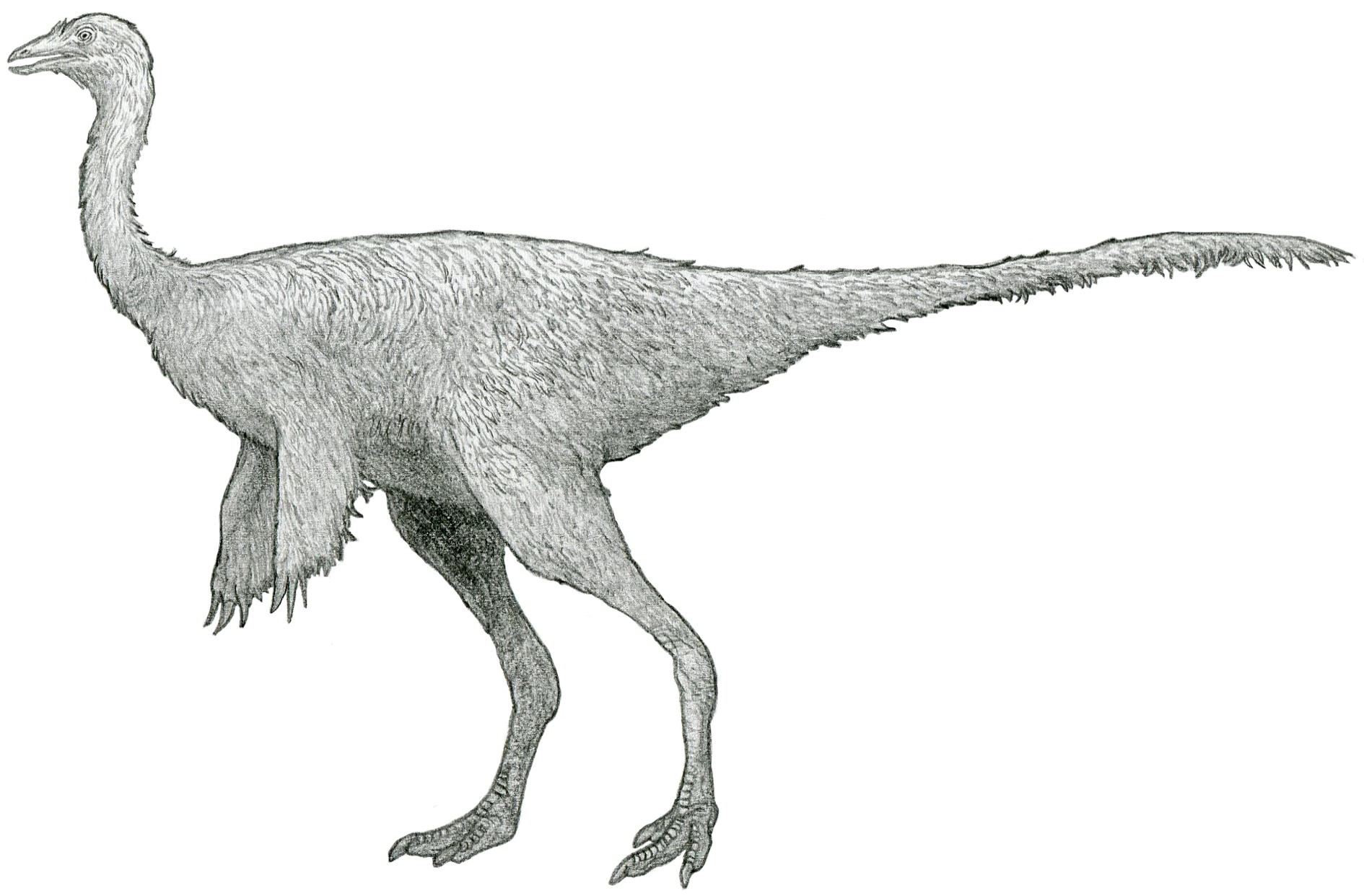
Life restoration

The known specimen of Rativates was a subadult or adult individual of at least eight years in age, as demonstrated through lines of arrested growth in a thin section of the right femur. It was small for an ornithomimid, being about 50% of the size of the largest individuals of Struthiomimus.

The authors identified four autapomorphies, unique derived traits, that distinguish Rativates from all other ornithomimids: the part of the maxilla contacting the jugal is relatively short and posteroventrally located; the tail vertebrae in front of the transition point (where the tail vertebrae become abruptly thinner and more elongated) have unusually horizontally short, mound-like neural spines; the left and right shafts of the ischia are entirely fused together on their back surfaces, with no vertical cleft between them; and the flexor edge of the third metatarsal is straight, not concave as in other ornithomimids.

In addition, the authors also noted other traits that distinguished it from the contemporary ornithomimids it shared its habitat with. Unlike Struthiomimus, the anterior portion of the ilium reaches as far forward as the end of the pubic shaft, and the medial (inner) edge of the third metatarsal is straighter as well. Compared to Ornithomimus, the antorbital fenestra is proportionally shorter. Finally, Rativates is smaller than the large Dinosaur Park ornithomimid (still unnamed as of 2016), and also differs in the anatomy of its unguals (foot claws).

== Classification ==
A phylogenetic analysis was conducted based on the dataset used in the description of the Bissekty Formation ornithomimid (subsequently named Dzharacursor). The analysis recovered Rativates in a polytomy of derived ornithomimids, consistent with a single radiation of ornithomimids in Laramidia during the Campanian.

- Ornithomimidae
  - Archaeornithomimus asiaticus
  - - Dzharacursor bissektensis
    - - Sinornithomimus dongi
      - Gallimimus bullatus
      - - Rativates evadens
        - Struthiomimus altus
        - Qiupalong henanensis
        - Anserimimus planinychus
        - Ornithomimus edmontonicus

== See also ==
- 2016 in paleontology
- Timeline of ornithomimosaur research
