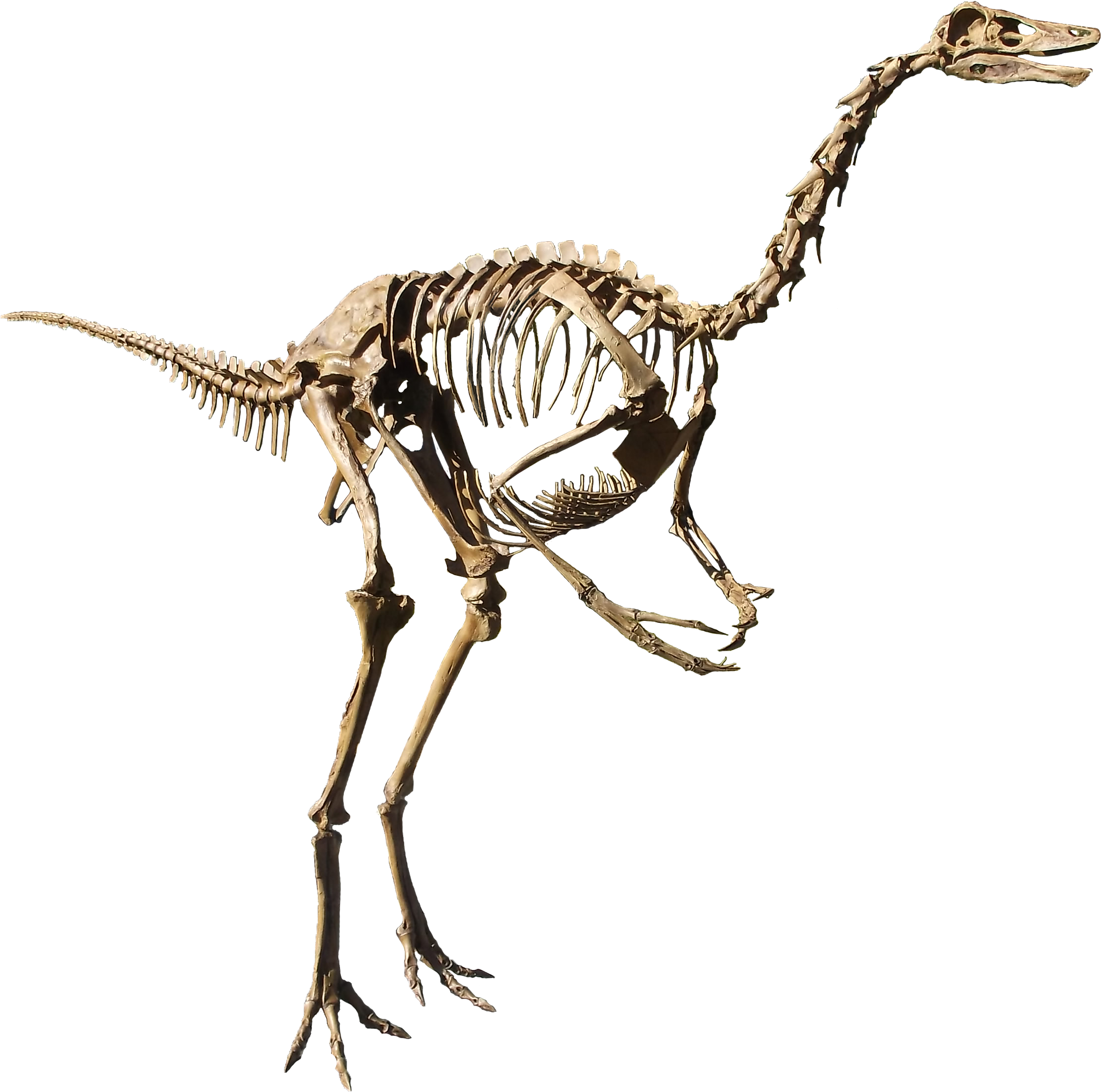
- Cast of an S. altus skeleton, Rocky Mountain Dinosaur Resource Center

Scientific classification
- Kingdom: Animalia
- Phylum: Chordata
- Class: Reptilia
- Clade: Dinosauria
- Clade: Saurischia
- Clade: Theropoda
- Clade: †Ornithomimosauria
- Family: †Ornithomimidae
- Genus: †Struthiomimus; Osborn, 1917

Type species
- Struthiomimus altus (Lambe, 1902)

Other species
- S. sedens?

Synonyms
- Ornithomimus altus Lambe, 1902

= Struthiomimus =

Struthiomimus Temporal range: Late Cretaceous, 77–66 Ma

Extinct genus of dinosaur

Struthiomimus (meaning "ostrich mimic", from the Ancient Greek στρούθειος/stroutheios, meaning "of the ostrich", and μῖμος/mimos, meaning "mimic" or "imitator") is a genus of ornithomimid dinosaurs from the Late Cretaceous of what is now western North America. They were long-legged, bipedal, ostrich-like dinosaurs with toothless beaks. The type species, Struthiomimus altus, is one of the more common, smaller dinosaurs found in Dinosaur Provincial Park. Their overall abundance, in addition to their toothless beak, suggests that these animals were mainly herbivorous or (more likely) omnivorous, rather than purely carnivorous. Similar to the modern ostriches, emus, and rheas (among other birds), these dinosaurs likely lived as opportunistic omnivores, supplementing a largely plant-based diet with a variety of small mammals, reptiles, amphibians, insects, invertebrates, and anything else they could fit into their mouth, as they foraged.

== History of discovery ==
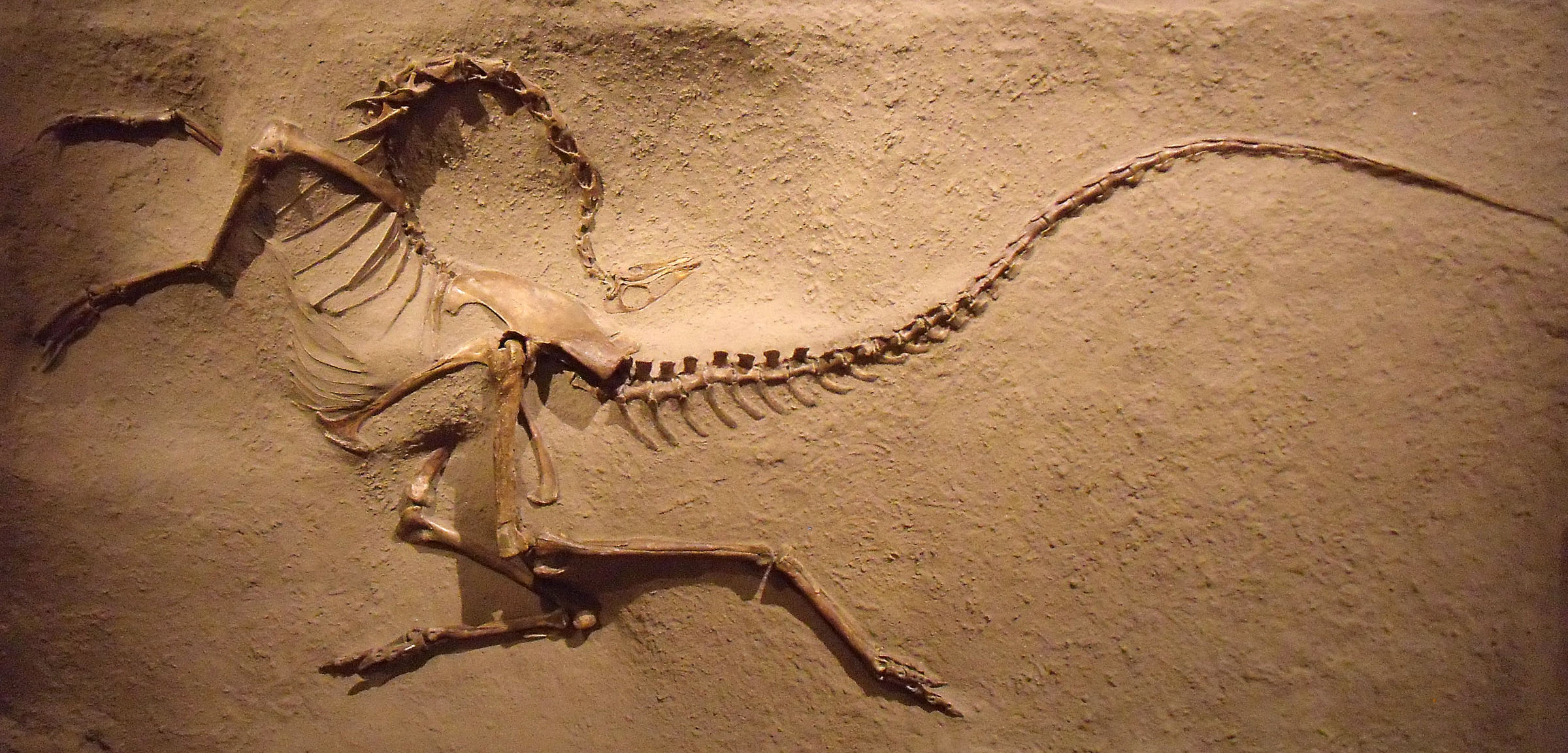
Cast of S. altus skeleton (specimen AMNH 5339), found in 1914

In 1901, Lawrence Lambe found some incomplete remains, holotype CMN 930, and named them Ornithomimus altus, placing them in the same genus as material earlier described by Othniel Charles Marsh in 1890. The specific name altus is from Latin, meaning "lofty" or "noble". However, in 1914, a nearly complete skeleton (AMNH 5339) was discovered by Barnum Brown at the Red Deer River site in Alberta, prompting O. altus to be described as the type species of a new genus, Struthiomimus, by Henry Fairfield Osborn in 1917. Dale Russell (1972) referred several additional specimens to S. altus: AMNH 5375, AMNH 5385, AMNH 5421, CMN 8897, CMN 8902 and ROM 1790, all partial skeletons. The type species, S. altus, is known from several skeletons and skulls, In 1917 Osborn also renamed Ornithomimus tenuis Marsh 1890 into Struthiomimus tenuis. This is today considered a nomen dubium. In 2016, ROM 1790 was made the holotype of a new genus and species, Rativates evadens.

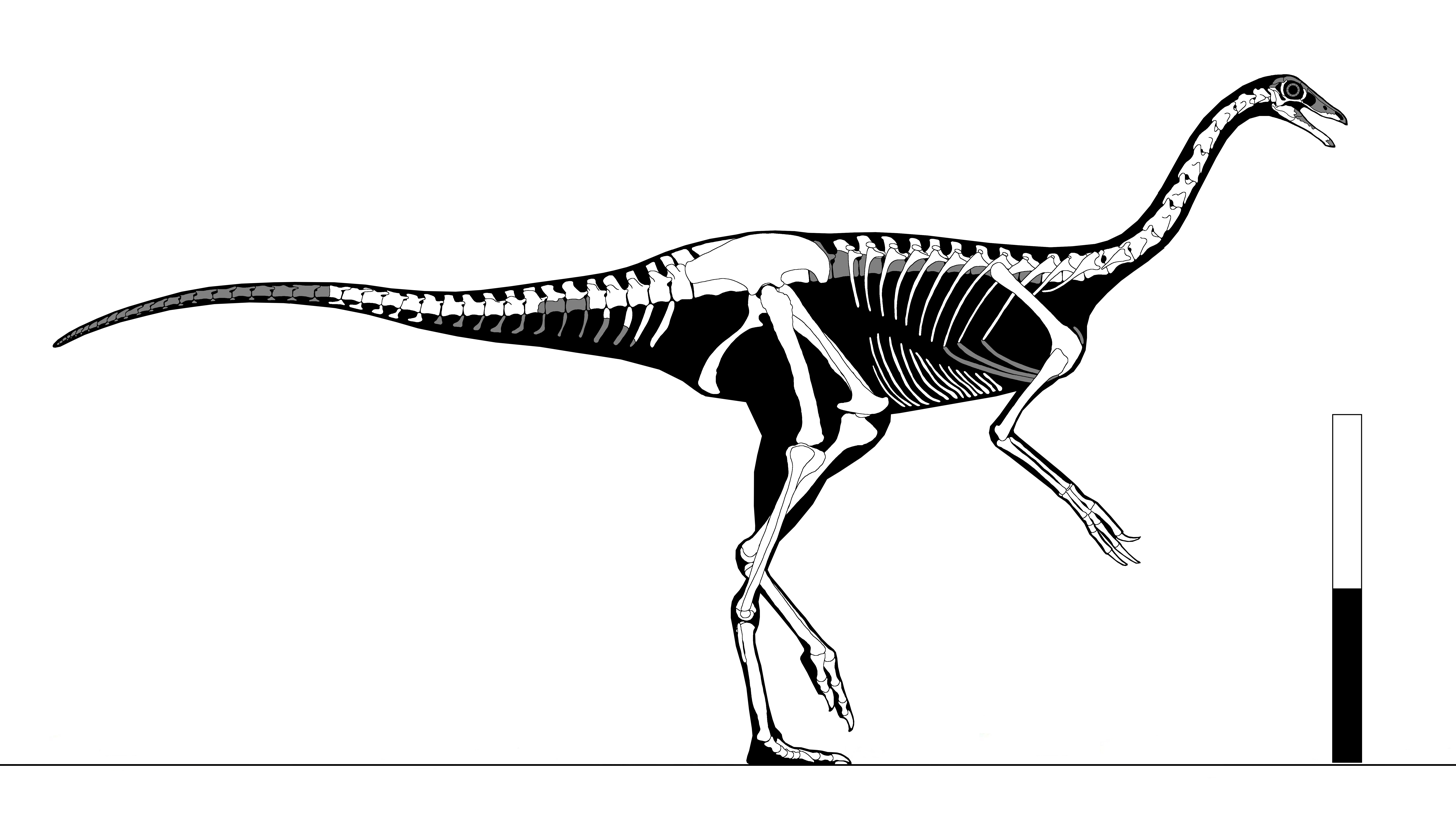
Skeletal diagram of S. altus specimen AMNH 5339

In subsequent years William Arthur Parks named four other species of Struthiomimus: Struthiomimus brevetertius Parks 1926, Struthiomimus samueli Parks 1928, Struthiomimus currellii Parks 1933 and Struthiomimus ingens Parks 1933. These are today seen as either belonging to Dromiceiomimus or to Ornithomimus.

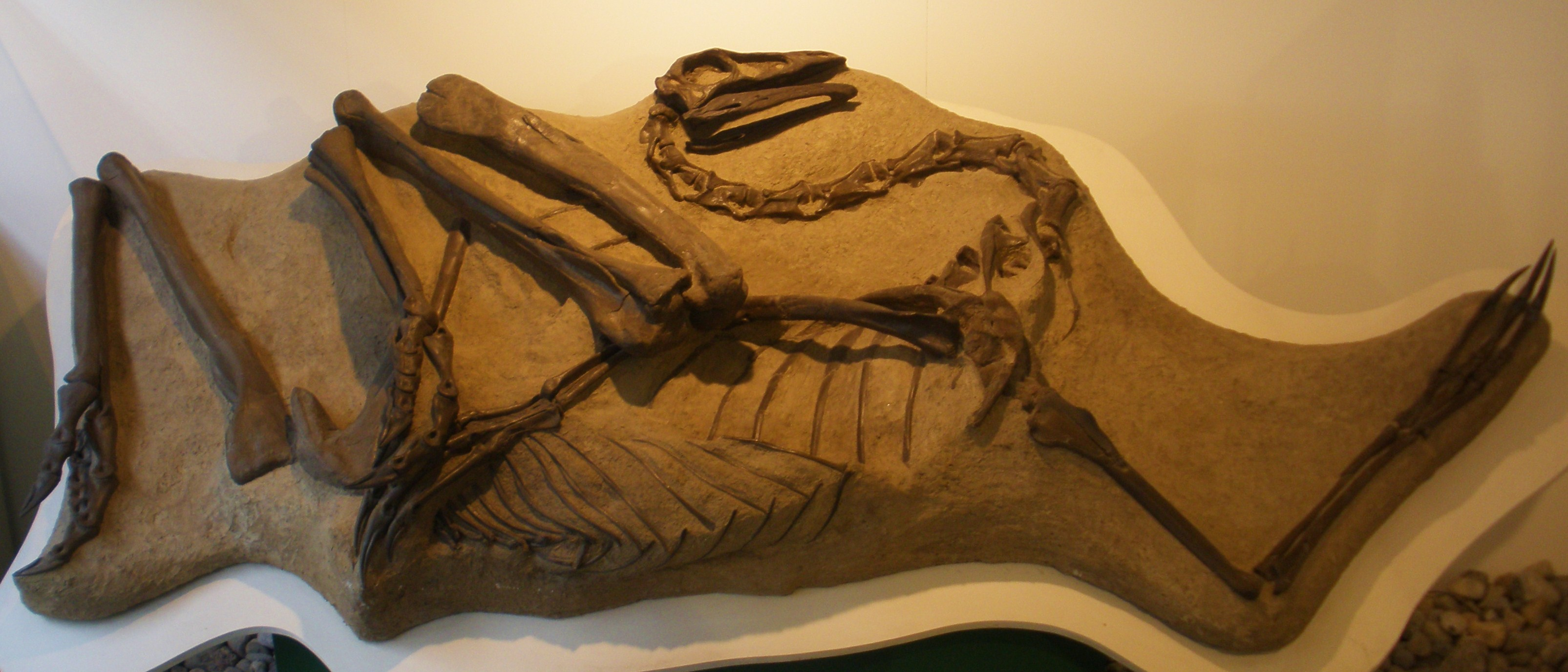
Cast of BHI 1266, which may be a Struthiomimus sedens specimen

In 1997 Donald Glut mentioned the name Struthiomimus lonzeensis. This was probably a lapsus calami, a mistake for Ornithomimus lonzeensis (Dollo 1903) Kuhn 1965. Struthiomimus altus comes from the Late Campanian (Judithian age) Oldman Formation.

A possible second species of Struthiomimus is known from the early Maastrichtian (Edmontonian age) Horseshoe Canyon Formation. Because dinosaur fauna show rapid turnover, it is likely that these younger Struthiomimus specimens represent a species distinct from S. altus, though no new name has been given to them.

Additional Struthiomimus specimens from the lower Lance Formation and equivalents are larger (similar to Gallimimus in size) and tend to have straighter and more elongate hand claws, similar to those seen in Ornithomimus. One relatively complete Lance Formation specimen, BHI 1266, was originally referred to Ornithomimus sedens (named by Marsh in 1892) and later classified as Struthiomimus sedens. One 2015 paper by van der Reest et al. listed BHI 1266 as Ornithomimus sp., while another paper the same year considered the specimen Struthiomimus sp. pending a re-evaluation of both genera.

== Description ==
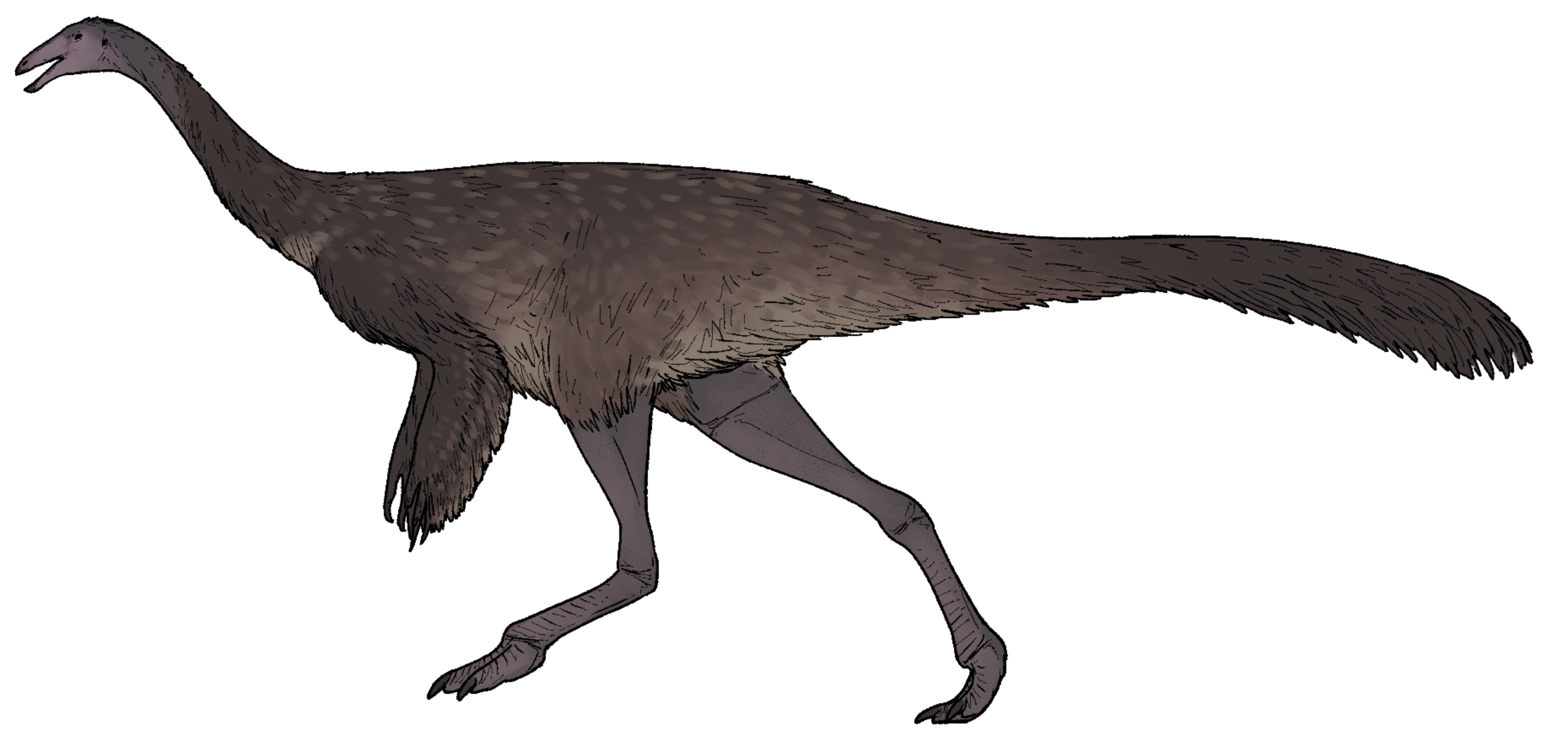
Life restoration of S. altus

The size of S. altus is estimated as about 4.3 metres (14 ft 1 in) long and 1.4 m (4 ft 7 in) tall at the hips, with a weight of around 150 kilograms (330 lb). A larger specimen of S. altus is estimated to weigh about 233.8 kilograms (515 lb). The specimens belonging to "S." sedens measured 4.8 metres (16 ft) long and weighed 350 kilograms (770 lb). Struthiomimus had a build and skeletal structure typical of ornithomimids, differing from closely related genera like Ornithomimus and Gallimimus in proportions and anatomical details.

Size comparison between S. altus and "S." sedens

As with other ornithomimids, they had small slender heads on long necks (which made up about 40% of the length of the body in front of the hips). Their eyes were large and their jaws were toothless. Their vertebral columns consisted of ten neck vertebrae, thirteen back vertebrae, six hip vertebrae, and about thirty-five tail vertebrae. Their tails were relatively stiff and probably used for balance. They had long slender arms and hands, with immobile forearm bones and limited opposability between the first finger and the other two. As in other ornithomimids but unusually among theropods, the three fingers were roughly the same length, and the claws were only slightly curved; Henry Fairfield Osborn, describing a skeleton of S. altus in 1917, compared the arm to that of a sloth. These might have been adaptations to support wing feathers. It is likely it had feathers all over its body. Struthiomimus differed from close relatives only in subtle aspects of anatomy. The edge of the upper beak was concave in Struthiomimus, unlike Ornithomimus, which had straight beak edges. Struthiomimus had longer hands relative to the humerus than other ornithomimids, with particularly long claws. Their forelimbs were more robust than Ornithomimus.

== Classification ==
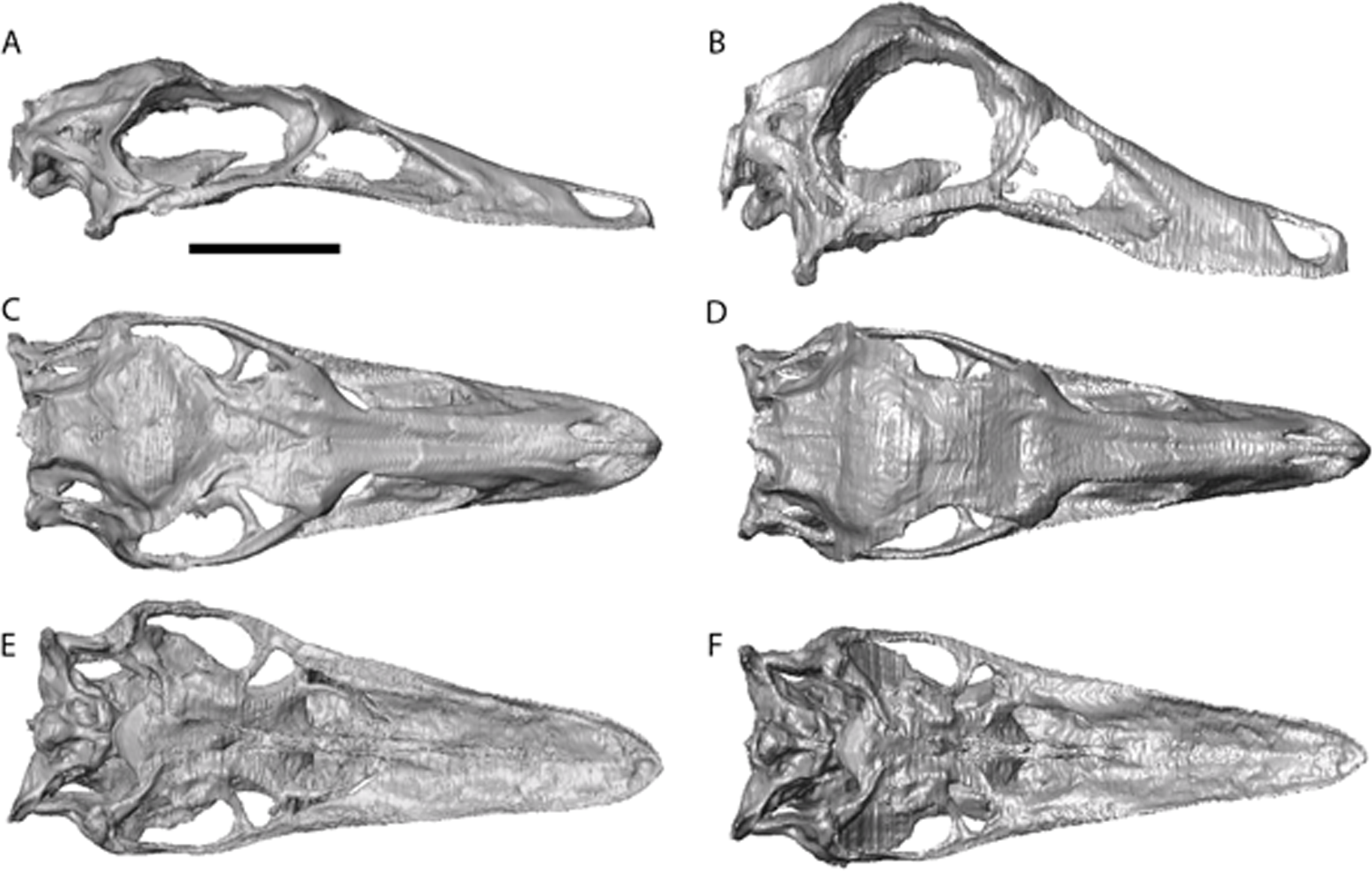
Original skull of RTMP 1990.026.0001 in A, C and E and restored in B, D and F

Struthiomimus is a member of the family Ornithomimidae, a group which also includes Anserimimus, Archaeornithomimus, Dromiceiomimus, Gallimimus, Ornithomimus, and Sinornithomimus.

Just as the fossil remains of Struthiomimus were incorrectly assigned to Ornithomimus, the larger group that Struthiomimus belongs to, the Ornithomimosauria, also underwent many changes over the years. For example, O.C. Marsh initially included Struthiomimus in the Ornithopoda, a large clade of dinosaurs not closely related to theropods. Five years later, Marsh classified Struthiomimus in the Ceratosauria. In 1891, Baur placed the genus within Iguanodontia. As late as 1993, Struthiomimus was referred to Oviraptorosauria. However, by the 1990s, there were numerous studies that placed Struthiomimus within Coelurosauria.

Recognizing the difference between ornithomimids and other theropods, Rinchen Barsbold placed ornithomimids within their own infraorder, Ornithomimosauria, in 1976. The constituency of Ornithomimidae and Ornithomimosauria varied with different authors. Paul Sereno, for example, used Ornithomimidae to include all ornithomimosaurians in 1998, but subsequently changed to a more exclusive definition (advanced ornithomimosaurs) within Ornithomimosauria, a classification scheme that was adopted by other authors at the beginning of the current century.

The cladogram follows the 2011 analysis by Xu et al.:

- Ornithomimidae
  - Archaeornithomimus
  - unnamed
    - Sinornithomimus
    - unnamed
      - - Anserimimus
        - Gallimimus
      - unnamed
        - Qiupalong
        - unnamed
          - Struthiomimus
          - Ornithomimus

== Paleobiology ==
In a 2001 study conducted by Bruce Rothschild and other paleontologists, fifty foot bones referred to Struthiomimus were examined for signs of stress fracture, but none were found.

Struthiomimus was one of the first theropods envisioned from the outset as having a horizontal posture. Osborn in 1916 let the animal intentionally be depicted with an elevated tail. This newer view created an image much more reminiscent of modern flightless birds, such as the ostrich to which this dinosaur's name refers, but would only much later be accepted for all theropods.

=== Diet ===
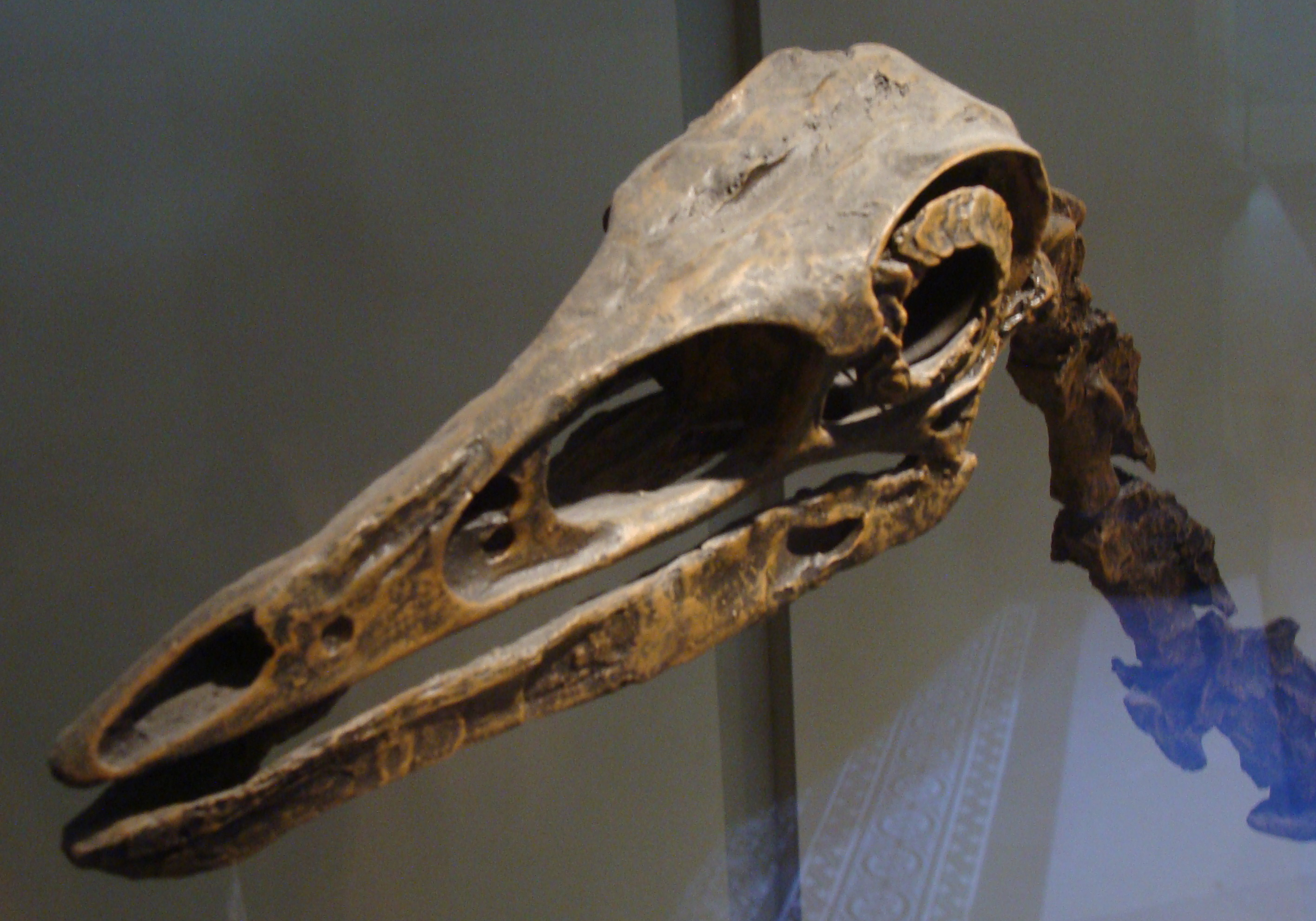
Reconstructed skull, Royal Belgian Institute of Natural Sciences, Brussels

There has been much discussion about the feeding habits of Struthiomimus. Because of its straight-edged beak, Struthiomimus may have been an omnivore. Some theories suggest that it may have been a shore-dweller and may have been a filter feeder. Some paleontologists noted that it was more likely to be a carnivore because it is classified within the otherwise carnivorous theropod group. This theory has never been discounted, but Osborn, who described and named the dinosaur, proposed that it probably ate buds and shoots from trees, shrubs and other plants, using its forelimbs to grasp branches and its long neck to enable it accurately to select particular items. This herbivorous diet is further supported by the unusual structure of its hands. The second and third fingers were of equal length, could not function independently, and were probably bound together by skin as a single unit. The structure of the shoulder girdle did not allow a high elevation of the arm nor was optimised for a low reach. The hand could not be fully flexed for a grasping motion or spread for raking. This indicates that the hand was used as a "hook" or "clamp", for bringing branches or fern fronds at shoulder height within reach. However, these adaptations might have been used for wing feather support instead.

=== Speed ===
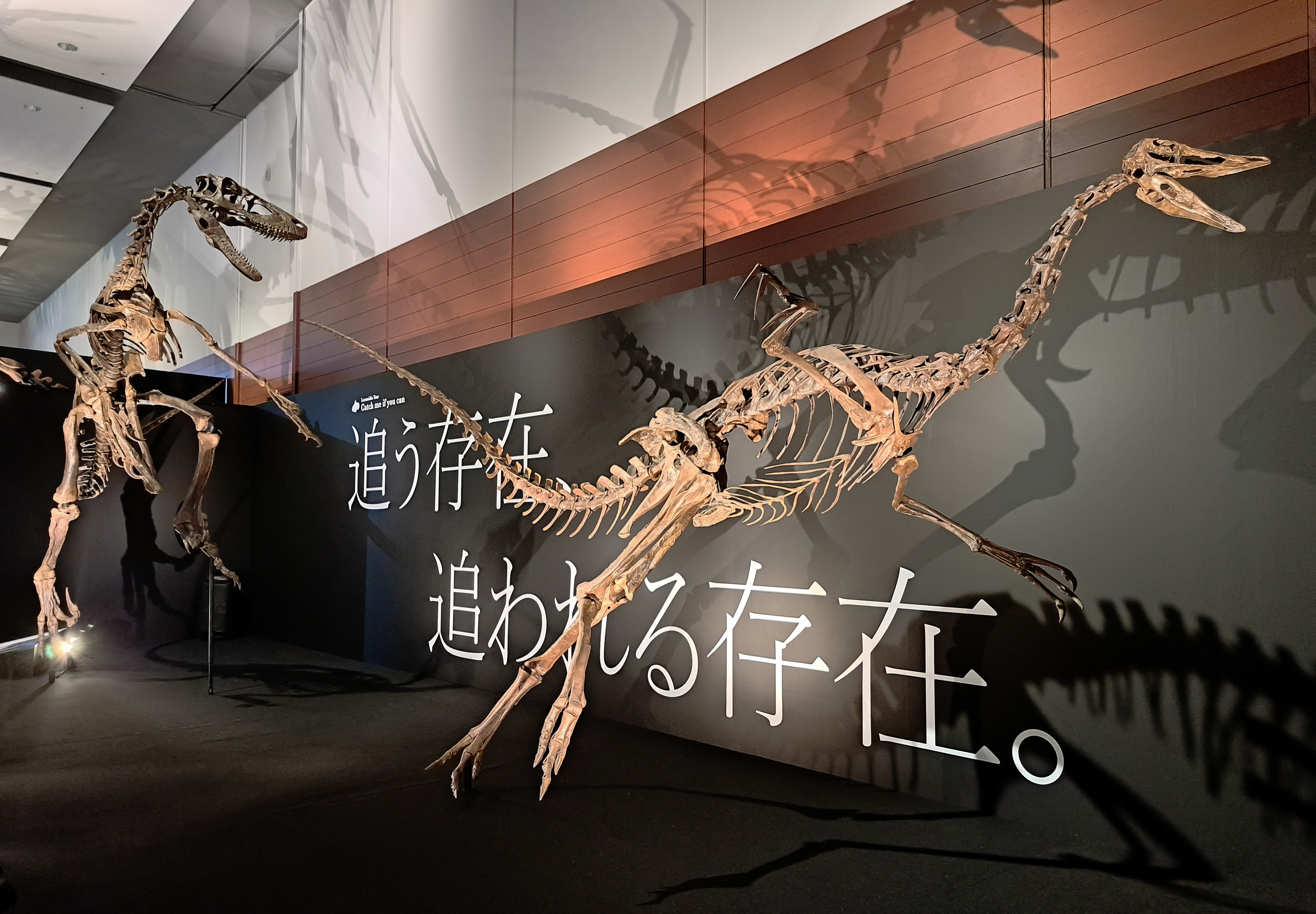
Mounted reconstructed skeletons depicting the scene of a Struthiomimus being chased by a Dakotaraptor

The legs (hind limbs) of Struthiomimus were long, powerful and seemingly well-suited to rapid running, much like an ostrich. The supposed speed of Struthiomimus was, in fact, its main defense from predators (although it may also have been able to lash out with its hind claws when cornered), such as the dromaeosaurids (e.g. Saurornitholestes and Dromaeosaurus) and tyrannosaurs (e.g. Daspletosaurus and Gorgosaurus), which lived at the same time. It is estimated to have been able to run at speeds between 50 and 80 km/h (31.1 and 49.7 mph).

== Paleoecology ==
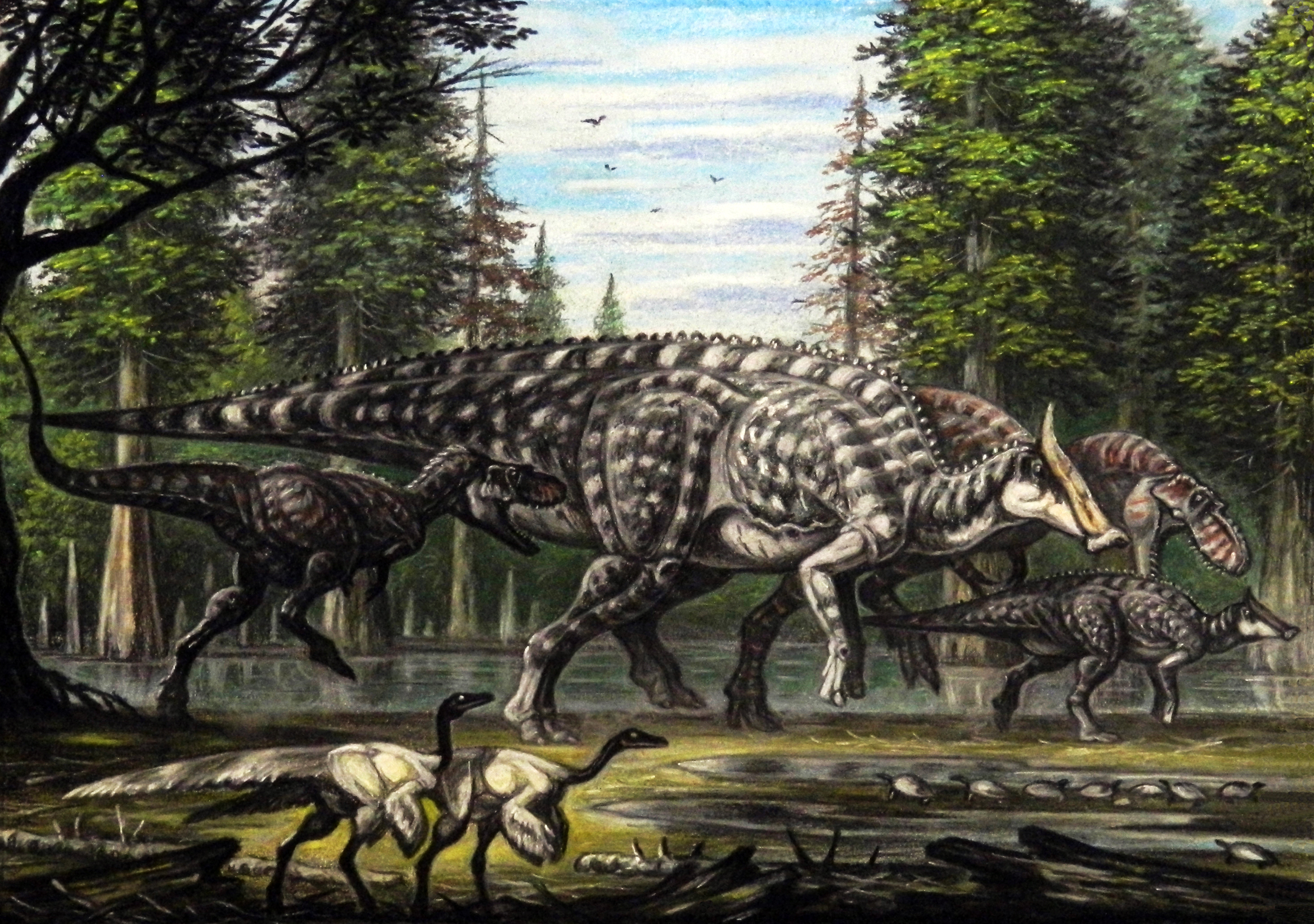
Albertosaurus hunting Saurolophus with Struthiomimus in the foreground

Fossil remains of S. altus are known from the Oldman Formation, dated to between 78 and 77 million years ago during the Campanian stage of the late Cretaceous period. S. altus has also been found in the Horseshoe Canyon Formation. A younger species (which has not yet been named), which apparently differed from S. altus in having longer, more slender hands, is known from several specimens found in the Horseshoe Canyon Formation and lower Lance Formation, between 69 and 67.5 million years ago (early Maastrichtian).

== See also ==
- Timeline of ornithomimosaur research
