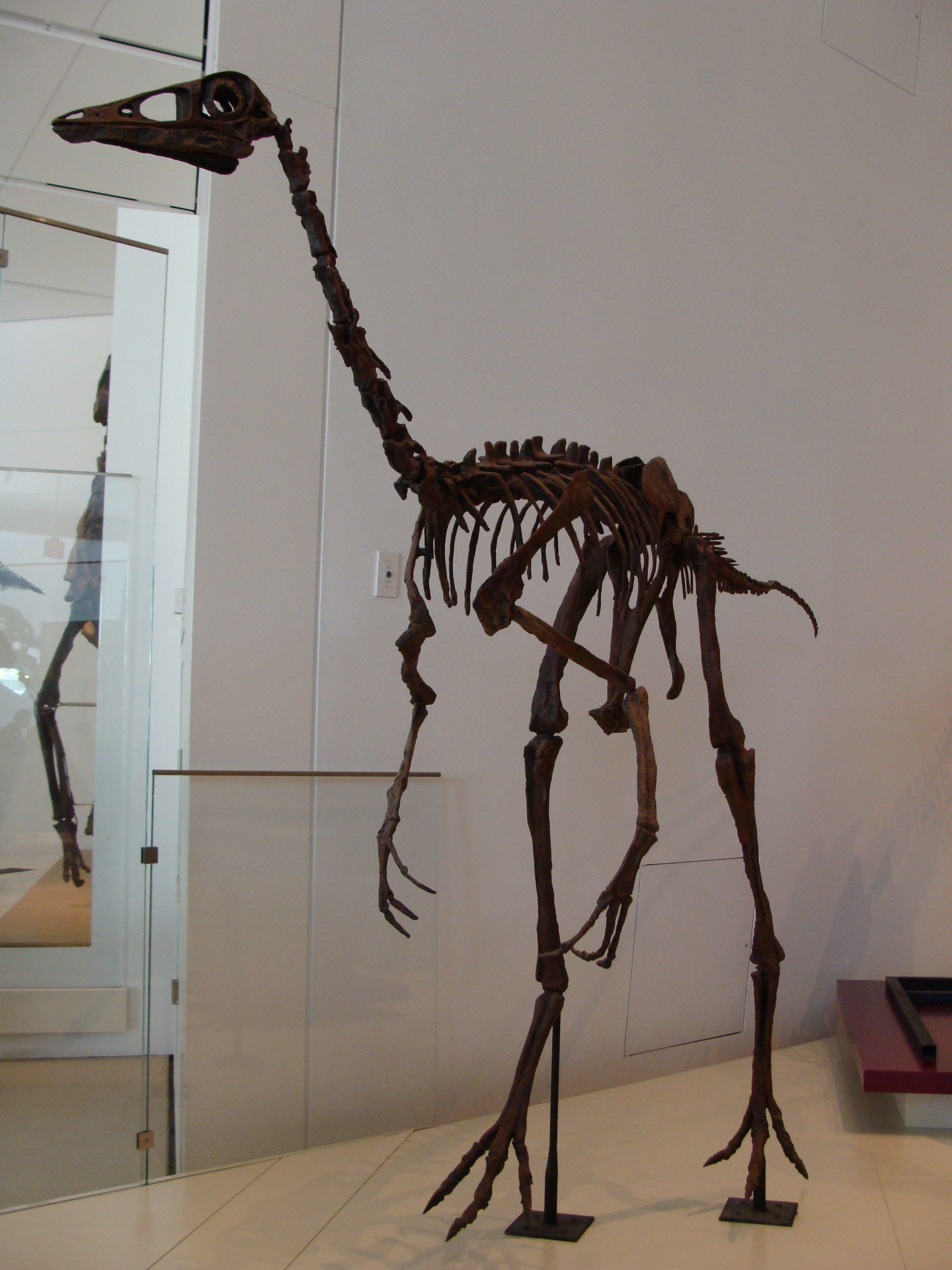
- Mounted O. edmontonicus skeleton, Royal Ontario Museum

Scientific classification
- Kingdom: Animalia
- Phylum: Chordata
- Class: Reptilia
- Clade: Dinosauria
- Clade: Saurischia
- Clade: Theropoda
- Clade: †Ornithomimosauria
- Family: †Ornithomimidae
- Genus: †Ornithomimus; Marsh, 1890

Type species
- †Ornithomimus velox Marsh, 1890

Other species
- †O. edmontonicus Sternberg, 1933; †O. samueli? (Parks, 1928)

= Ornithomimus =

Ornithomimus Temporal range: Late Cretaceous (Campanian to Maastrichtian), 76.5–66 Ma

Ornithomimid dinosaur genus from the Late Cretaceous Period

Ornithomimus (/ˌɔːrnɪθəˈmaɪməs, -θoʊ-/; "bird mimic") is a genus of ornithomimid theropod dinosaurs from the Campanian and Maastrichtian ages of the Late Cretaceous in western North America. Ornithomimus was a swift, bipedal dinosaur which was covered in feathers and equipped with a small toothless beak that may indicate an omnivorous diet. It is usually classified into two species: the type species, Ornithomimus velox, and a referred species, Ornithomimus edmontonicus.

O. velox was named in 1890 by Othniel Charles Marsh on the basis of a foot and partial hand from the Denver Formation of Colorado. Other seventeen species have been named since then, though almost all of them have been subsequently assigned to new genera or shown not to be directly related to O. velox. The best material of species still considered part of the genus has been found in Alberta, representing the species O. edmontonicus, known from several skeletons from the Horseshoe Canyon Formation. Additional species and specimens from other formations are sometimes classified in the genus, such as Ornithomimus samueli (alternatively classified in the genera Dromiceiomimus or Struthiomimus) from the earlier Dinosaur Park Formation.

== History of discovery ==
=== First species named ===
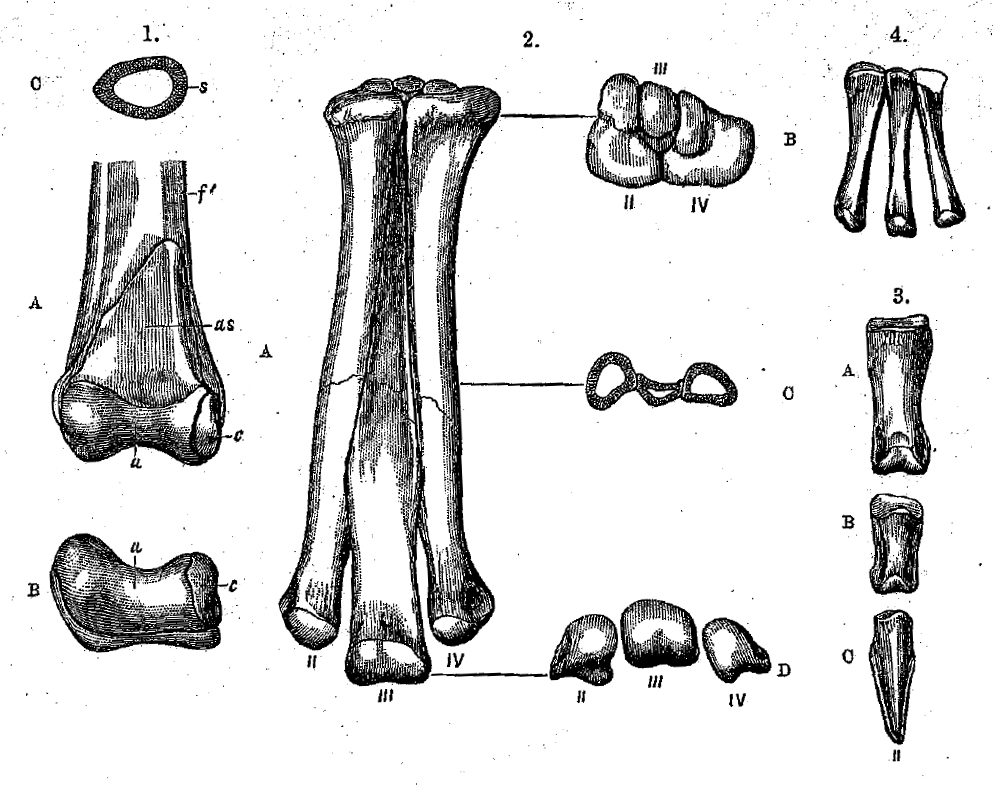
Holotype material of O. velox

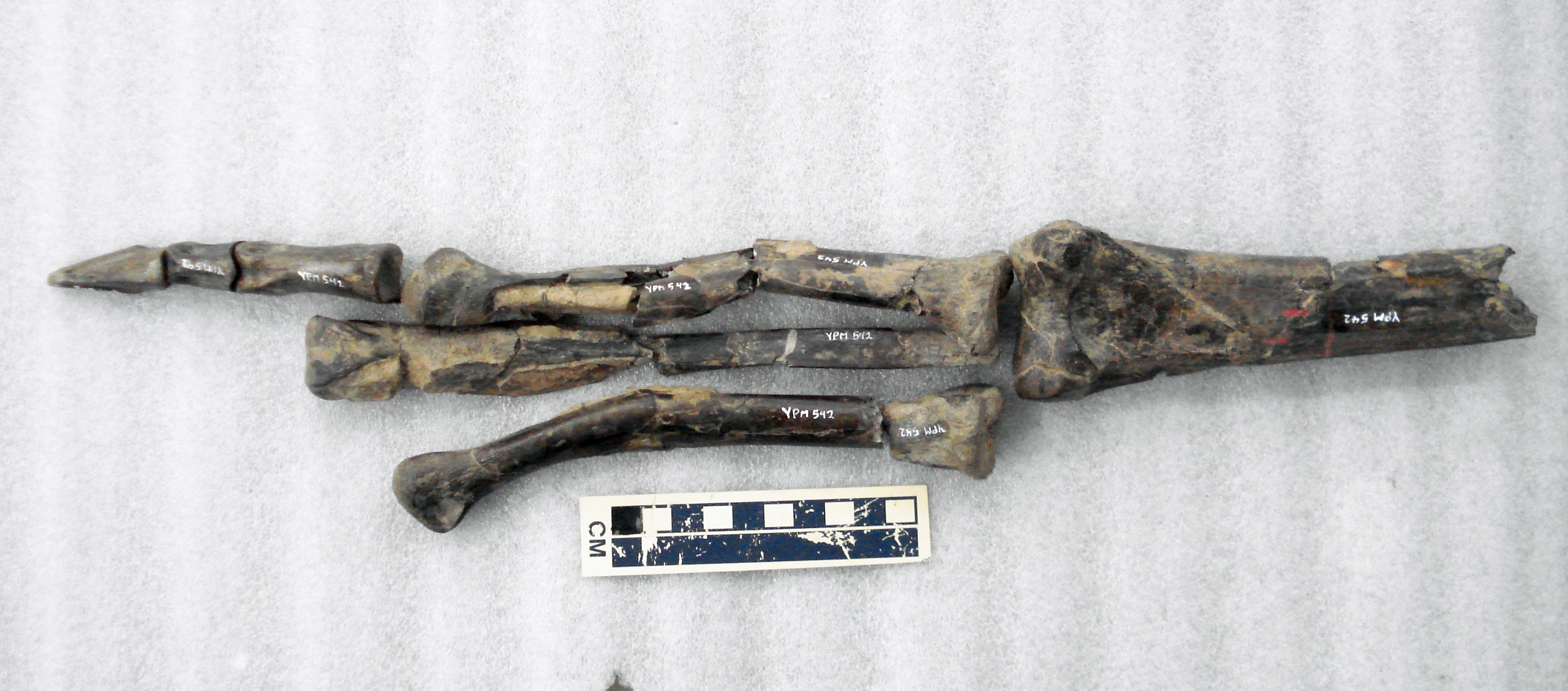
Ornithomimus velox type specimen

The history of Ornithomimus classification and the classification of ornithomimids in general has been very complicated. The type species, Ornithomimus velox, was first named by O.C. Marsh in 1890 and is based on syntypes YPM 542 and YPM 548 (a partial hindlimb and forelimb, respectively), found by George Lyman Cannon in the Denver Formation of Colorado on June 30, 1889. The generic name means "bird mimic", derived from Greek words ὄρνις (ornis), "bird", and μῖμος (mimos), "mimic", in reference to the bird-like foot. The specific name means "swift" in Latin. Simultaneously, Marsh named two other species: Ornithomimus tenuis (based on specimen USNM 5814) and Ornithomimus grandis. Both consist of fragmentary fossils found by John Bell Hatcher in Montana, which is today understood as tyrannosauroid material. At first, Marsh assumed Ornithomimus was an ornithopod, but this changed when Hatcher and A. E. Sullins found the specimen USNM 4736, a partial ornithomimid skeleton, in 1891 from the Lance Formation of Wyoming. Marsh named it Ornithomimus sedens in 1892, though the specimen remained unnumbered and not figured until Charles Whitney Gilmore's 1920 re-description. Marsh also named Ornithomimus minutus was also created based on the specimen YPM 1049 (a metatarsus) in 1892, but it has since been recognized as belonging to an alvarezsaurid.

A sixth species, Ornithomimus altus, was named in 1902 by Lawrence Lambe and was based on specimen CMN 930 (hindlimbs found in 1901 in Alberta), but this was renamed to a separate genus in 1916: Struthiomimus, by Henry Fairfield Osborn. In 1920, Gilmore named Ornithomimus affinis for Dryosaurus grandis (Lull 1911), based on indeterminate material. In 1930, Loris Russell renamed Struthiomimus brevetertius (Parks 1926) and Struthiomimus samueli (Parks 1928) into Ornithomimus brevitertius and Ornithomimus samueli, respectively. The very same year, Oliver Perry Hay renamed Aublysodon mirandus (Leidy 1868) into Ornithomimus mirandus, which is today seen as a nomen dubium. In 1933, William Arthur Parks created the species Ornithomimus elegans, which is today seen as either Chirostenotes or Elmisaurus. That same year, Gilmore named Ornithomimus asiaticus for material found in Inner Mongolia.

Also in 1933, Charles Mortram Sternberg named the species Ornithomimus edmontonicus for a nearly complete skeleton from the Horseshoe Canyon Formation (specimen CMN 8632).

=== Reclassification by Dale Russell ===
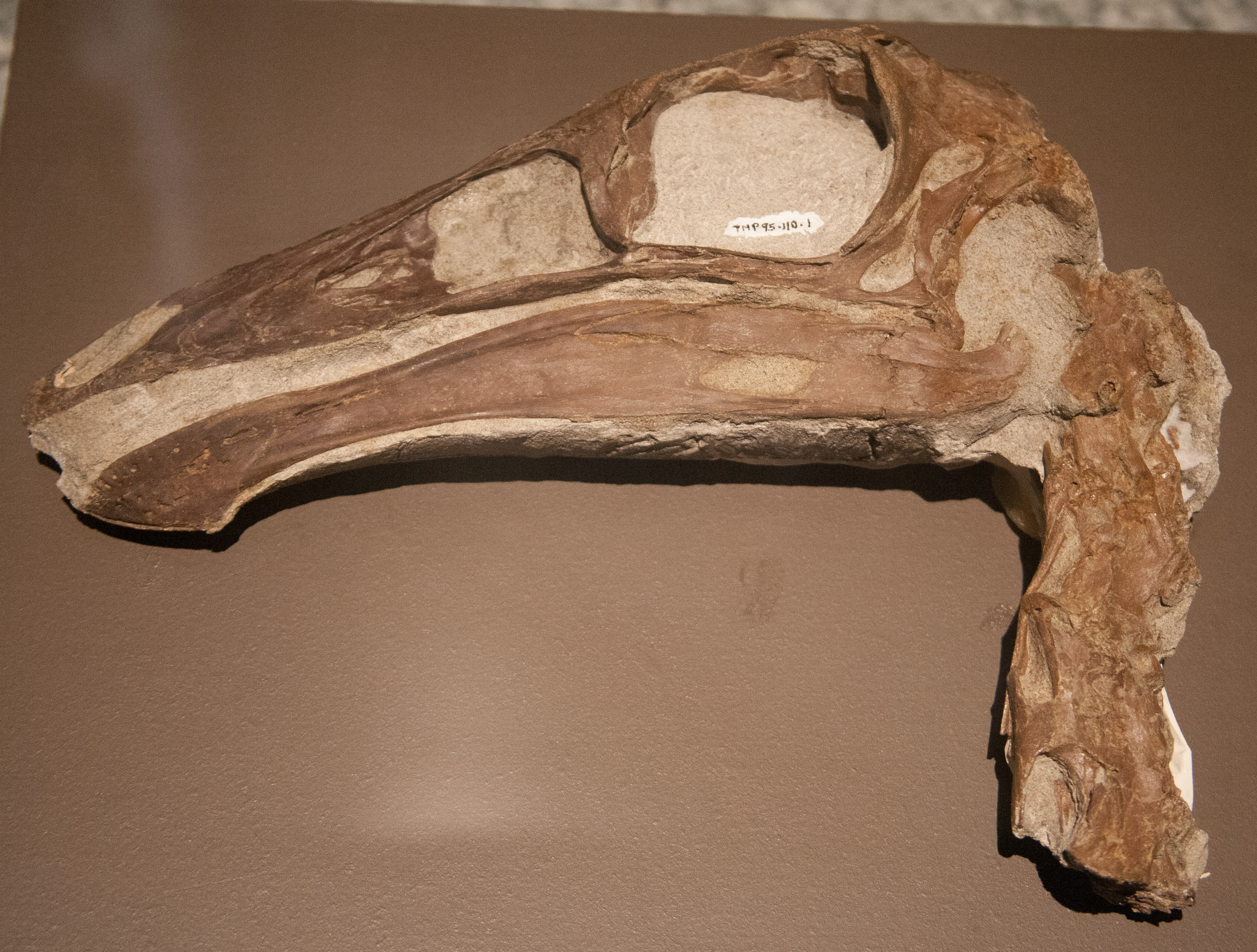
Skull and neck of Ornithomimus sp. (RTMP 95.110.1)

At first, it had been common practice to name each newly discovered ornithomimid as a species of Ornithomimus. In the sixties, this tendency was still very strong, as is shown by the fact that Oskar Kuhn renamed Megalosaurus lonzeensis (Dollo 1903) from Belgium into Ornithomimus lonzeensis (which is understood today to be an abelisauroid claw) and Dale Russell in 1967 renamed Struthiomimus currellii (Parks 1933) and Struthiomimus ingens (Parks 1933) into Ornithomimus currellii and Ornithomimus ingens, respectively. At the same time, it was usual that workers referred to the entire ornithomimid material as simply "Struthiomimus". To solve this confusion by scientifically testing the separation between Ornithomimus and Struthiomimus, Dale Russell in 1972 published a morphometric study. It showed that statistical differences in some proportions could be used to distinguish the two and he concluded that Struthiomimus and Ornithomimus were valid genera. In the latter, Russell recognised two species: the type species Ornithomimus velox and Ornithomimus edmontonicus (even though he had trouble reliably distinguishing it from O. velox). He considered Struthiomimus currellii to be a younger synonym of Ornithomimus edmontonicus. However, Russell also interpreted the data as indicating that many specimens could not be referred to either Ornithomimus or Struthiomimus. Therefore, he created two new genera. The first one was Archaeornithomimus. Ornithomimus asiaticus and Ornithomimus affinis were reassigned to this new genus, becoming Archaeornithomimus asiaticus and Archaeornithomimus affinis. The second one was Dromiceiomimus, meaning "Emu mimic". This comes from the old generic name for the emu: Dromiceius. Russell assigned several former Ornithomimus species named during the 20th century, including O. brevitertius and O. ingens, to this new genus as Dromiceiomimus brevitertius. He also renamed Ornithomimus samueli into a second Dromiceiomimus species: Dromiceiomimus samueli.

=== Misassigned to Ornithomimus ===
Two tibiae from the Navesink Formation of New Jersey were named Coelosaurus antiquus ("antique hollow lizard") by Joseph Leidy in 1865. The tibiae were first attributed to Ornithomimus in 1979 by Donald Baird and John R. Horner as Ornithomimus antiquus. Normally, this would have made Ornithomimus a junior synonym of Coelosaurus, but Baird and Horner discovered that the name "Coelosaurus" was preoccupied by a dubious taxon, which was based on a single vertebra. It was originally named Coelosaurus by an anonymous author now known to be Richard Owen in 1854. Baird referred several other specimens from New Jersey and Maryland to O. antiquus. Beginning in 1997, Robert M. Sullivan regarded O. velox and O. edmontonicus as junior synonyms of O. antiquus. Like Russell, he considered the former two species indistinguishable from each other and noted that they both shared distinctive features with O. antiquus. However, David Weishampel (2004) considered "C." antiquus to be indeterminate among ornithomimosaurs, resulting in it being a nomen dubium. An SVP 2012 abstract agreed with Weishampel by noting that Coelosaurus differs from Gallimimus and Ornithomimus in the features of the tibiae.

In 1988, Gregory S. Paul classified the various species of Archaeornithomimus, Struthiomimus, Dromiceiomimus, and Gallimimus to the genus Ornithomimus. This has found no acceptance among other workers and the name is not presently used by Paul himself.

=== Present interpretations ===
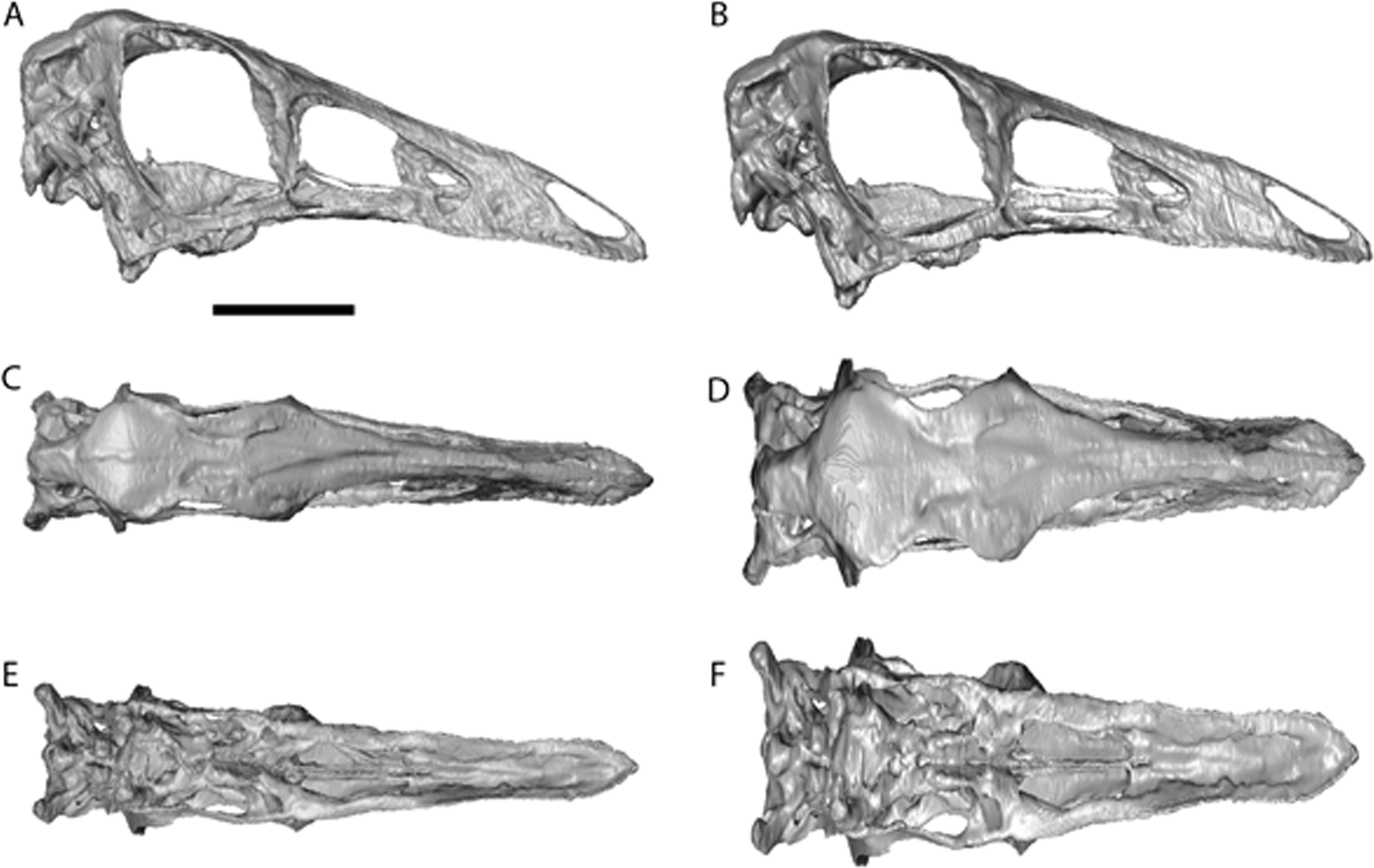
T scan of O. edmontonicus skull RTMP 1995.110.0001, with taphonomically deformed bones reconstructed on the right

Even after Russell's study, various researchers have found reasons to lump some or all of these species back into Ornithomimus in various combinations. In 2004, Peter Makovicky, Yoshitsugu Kobayashi, and Phil Currie studied Russell's 1972 proportional statistics to re-analyze ornithomimid relationships in light of newly discovered specimens. They concluded that there was no justification to separate Dromiceiomimus from Ornithomimus, sinking Dromiceiomimus as a synonym of O. edmontonicus. However, they did not include the type species O. velox in this analysis. The same team further supported the synonymy between Dromiceiomimus and O. edmontonicus in a 2006 lecture at the Society of Vertebrate Paleontology annual meeting. Their opinion has been followed by most later authors. Makovicky's team also considered Dromiceiomimus samueli to be a junior synonym of O. edmontonicus, though Longrich later suggested it may belong to a distinct, unnamed species from the Dinosaur Park Formation which has yet to be described. Longrich called the species Ornithomimus samueli in a faunal list for the Dinosaur Park Formation.

Apart from O. edmontonicus dating to the early Maastrichtian, two other species are presently considered to be possibly valid and are also from the late Maastrichtian. O. sedens was named by Marsh in 1892 from partial remains found in the Lance Formation of Wyoming a year after the description of O. velox. Dale Russell, in his 1972 revision of ornithomimids, could not determine which genus it actually belonged to, though he speculated that it may be intermediate between Struthiomimus and Dromiceiomimus. In 1985, he considered it to be a species of Ornithomimus. Although it has since been referred to mainly as Struthiomimus sedens (based on complete specimens from Montana and some fragments from Alberta and Saskatchewan), these have yet to be described and compared to the O. sedens holotype.

The other is the original type species: O. velox, at first known from very limited remains. Additional specimens referred to O. velox have been described from the Denver Formation and from the Ferris Formation of Wyoming. One specimen attributed to O. velox (MNA P1 1762A) from the Kaiparowits Formation of Utah was described in 1985. Re-evaluation of this specimen by Lindsay Zanno and colleagues in 2010, however, cast doubt on its assignment to O. velox and possibly even to Ornithomimus. This conclusion was supported by a 2015 re-description of O. velox, which found that only the holotype specimen was confidently referable to that species. The authors of this study tentatively referred to the Kaiparowits specimen as Ornithomimus sp., along with all of the specimens from the Dinosaur Park Formation.

== Description ==
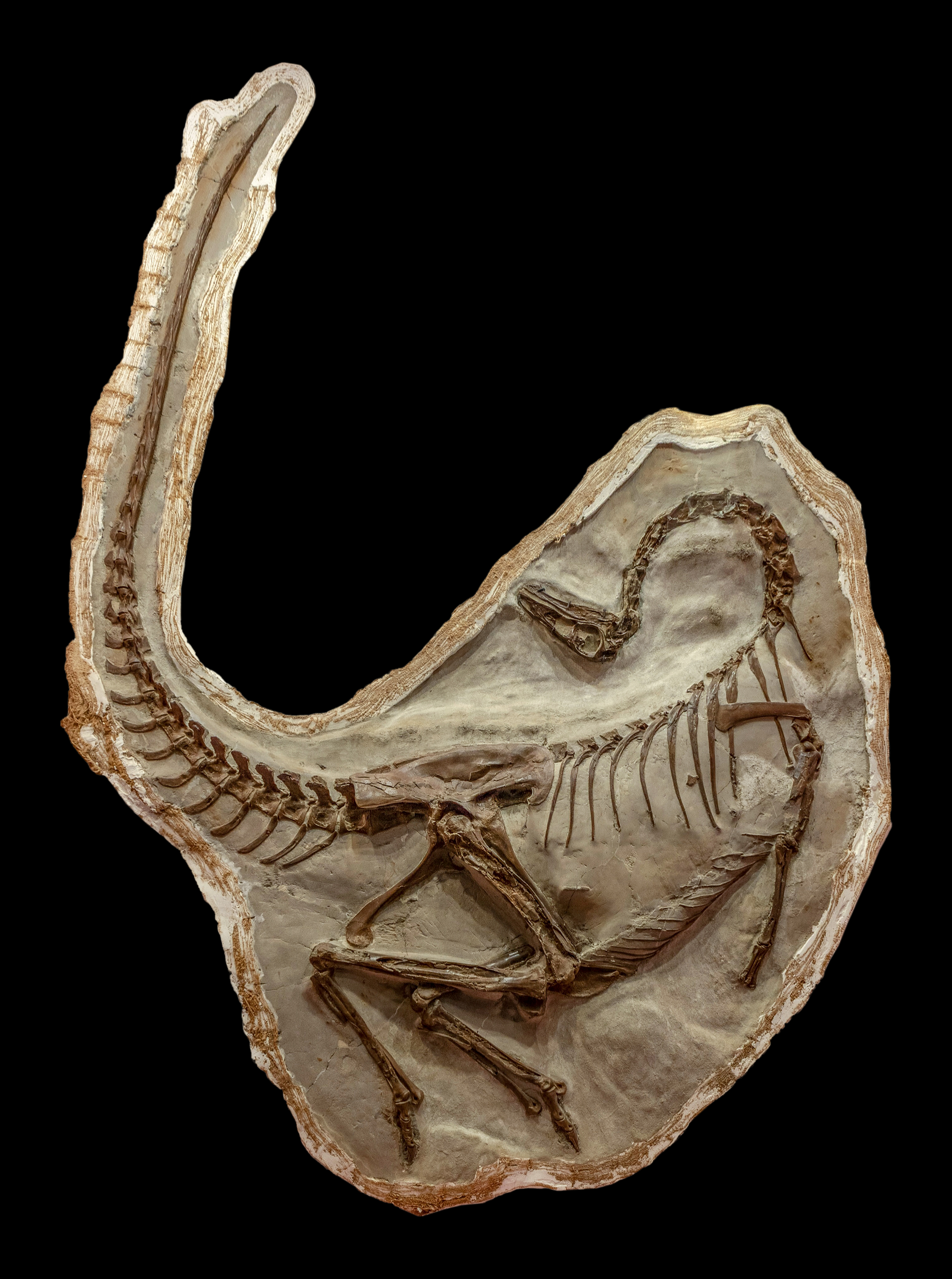
O. edmontonicus (TMP 1995.110.1), found in 1995 with quill knobs. It was an adult based on the presence of an external fundamental system (EFS) and 10 lines of arrested growth (LAGs) in the femur.

Like other ornithomimids, species of Ornithomimus are characterized by feet with three weight-bearing toes, long slender arms, and long necks with birdlike, elongated, toothless, beaked skulls. They were bipedal and superficially resemblant to ratites. They would have been swift runners thanks to their very long limbs and hollow bones. They also had large brains and large eyes. The brains of ornithomimids in general were large for non-avialan dinosaurs, but this may not necessarily be a sign of high intelligence. Some paleontologists think that the enlarged portions of the brain were dedicated to kinesthetic coordination. The bones of the hands are remarkably sloth-like in appearance, which led Henry Fairfield Osborn to suggest that they were used to hook branches during feeding.

Ornithomimus differs from other ornithomimids, such as Struthiomimus, in having shorter torsos, long slender forearms, very slender, straight hand and foot claws, and hand bones and fingers of similar lengths.

Size of the two valid species

The two Ornithomimus species today seen as possibly valid differ in size. In 2010, Gregory S. Paul estimated the length of O. edmontonicus at 3.8 m (12 ft) and its weight at 170 kilograms (370 lb). One of its specimens, CMN 12228, preserves a femur that is 46.8 centimetres (18.4 in) long. O. velox, the type species of Ornithomimus, is based on material of a smaller animal. Whereas the holotype of O. edmontonicus, CMN 8632, preserves a second metacarpal eighty-four millimetres long, the same element with O. velox measures only fifty-three millimetres.

=== Feathers and skin ===
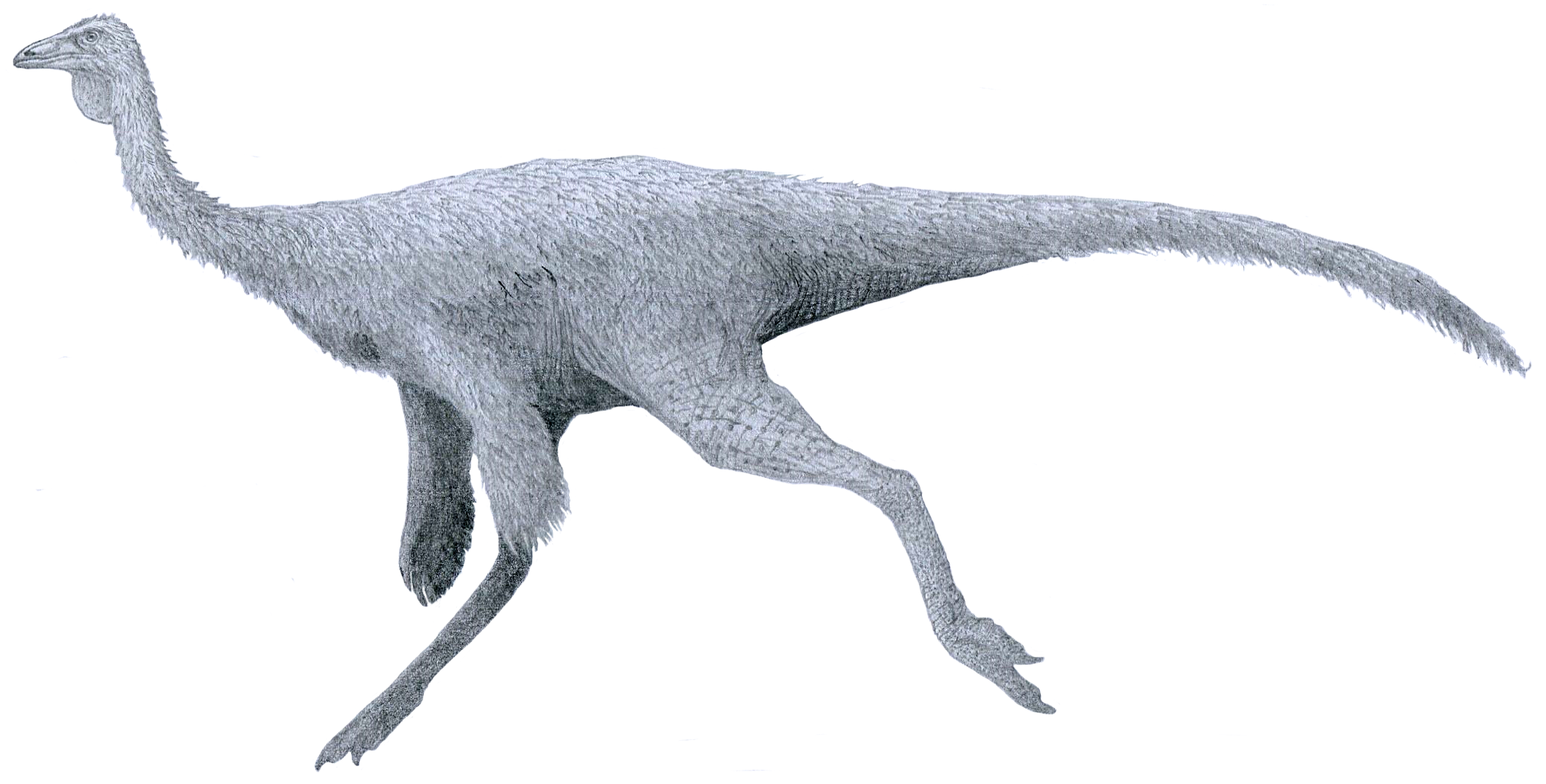
Life restoration of the plumage pattern suggested by specimens preserving feathers and skin

Ornithomimus, like many dinosaurs, was long thought to have been scaly. However, beginning in 1995, several specimens of Ornithomimus have been found preserving evidence of feathers. In 1995, 2008, and 2009, three Ornithomimus edmontonicus specimens with evidence of feathers were found (two adults with carbonized traces on the lower arm, indicating the former presence of pennaceous feather shafts, and a juvenile with impressions of feathers, which were up to five centimetres in length, in the form of hair-like filaments covering the rump, legs, and neck was also discovered). The fact that the feather imprints were found in sandstone, previously thought to not be able to support such impressions, raised the possibility of finding similar structures with more careful preparation of future specimens. A study describing the fossils in 2012 concluded that O. edmontonicus was covered in plumaceous feathers at all growth stages and that only adults had pennaceous wing-like structures, suggesting that wings may have evolved for mating displays. In 2014, Christian Foth and others argued that the evidence was insufficient to conclude that the forelimb feathers of Ornithomimus were necessarily pennaceous, citing the fact that the monofilamentous wing feathers in cassowaries would likely leave similar traces.

A fourth feathered specimen of Ornithomimus, this time from the lower portion of the Dinosaur Park Formation, was described in October of 2015 by Aaron van der Reest, Alex Wolfe, and Phil Currie. It was the first Ornithomimus specimen to preserve the feathers of its tail. The feathers, though crushed and distorted, bore numerous similarities to those of an ostrich, both in structure and distribution. Skin impressions were also preserved in the 2015 specimen, which indicated that, from mid-thigh to the feet, there was bare skin and that a flap of skin connecting the upper thigh to the torso. This latter structure is similar to that found in modern birds, including ostriches, but was positioned higher above the knee in Ornithomimus than in birds.

== Classification ==
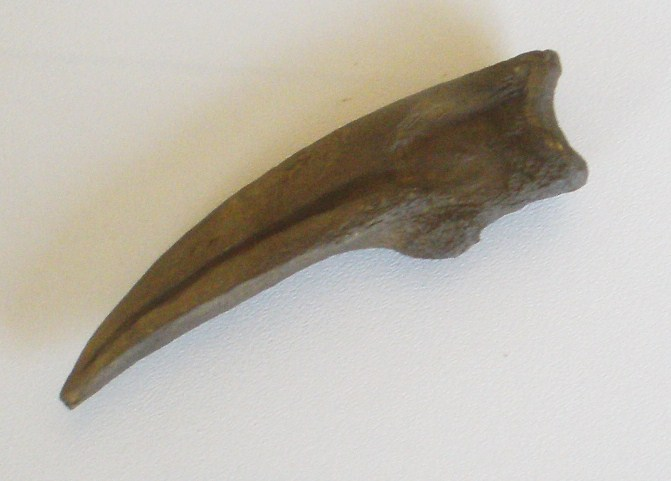
Claw bone

In 1890, Marsh assigned Ornithomimus to the clade Ornithomimosauria, a classification that is still very common. Modern cladistic studies indicate it having a derived position in the ornithomimids. These, however, have only included O. edmontonicus in their analyses. The relationships between O. edmontonicus, O. velox, and O. sedens have not been published.

The following cladogram is based on Xu et al., 2011:

- Ornithomimidae
  - Archaeornithomimus asiaticus
  - unnamed
    - Sinornithomimus dongi
    - unnamed
      - - Anserimimus planinychus
        - Gallimimus bullatus
      - unnamed
        - Qiupalong henanensis
        - unnamed
          - Struthiomimus altus
          - Ornithomimus edmontonicus

== Paleobiology ==
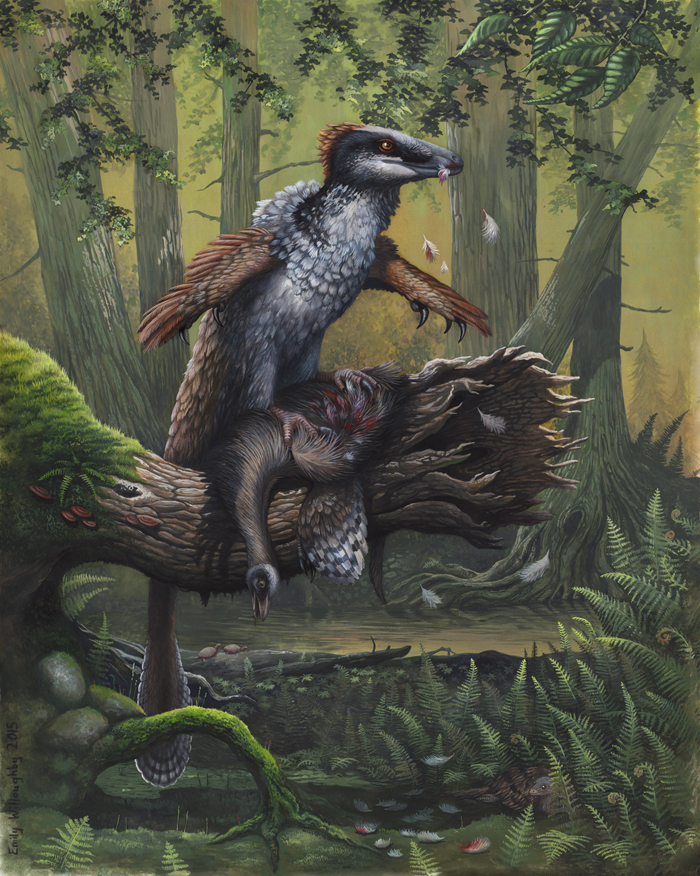
An Ornithomimus being restrained while preyed upon by Dakotaraptor

The diet of Ornithomimus is still highly debated. As theropods, ornithomimids might have been carnivorous, but their body shape would have been suited for a largely omnivorous lifestyle. Suggested food in its diet includes insects, crustaceans, fruit, leaves, branches, flowers, frogs, lizards, and small mammals.

Ornithomimus had legs that seem clearly suited for rapid locomotion, with the tibia being about 20% longer than the femur. The large eye sockets suggest a keen visual sense and also suggest the possibility that they were nocturnal.

In a 2001 study conducted by Bruce Rothschild and other paleontologists, 178 foot bones referred to Ornithomimus were examined for signs of stress fracture, but none were found.

== See also ==
- Timeline of ornithomimosaur research
