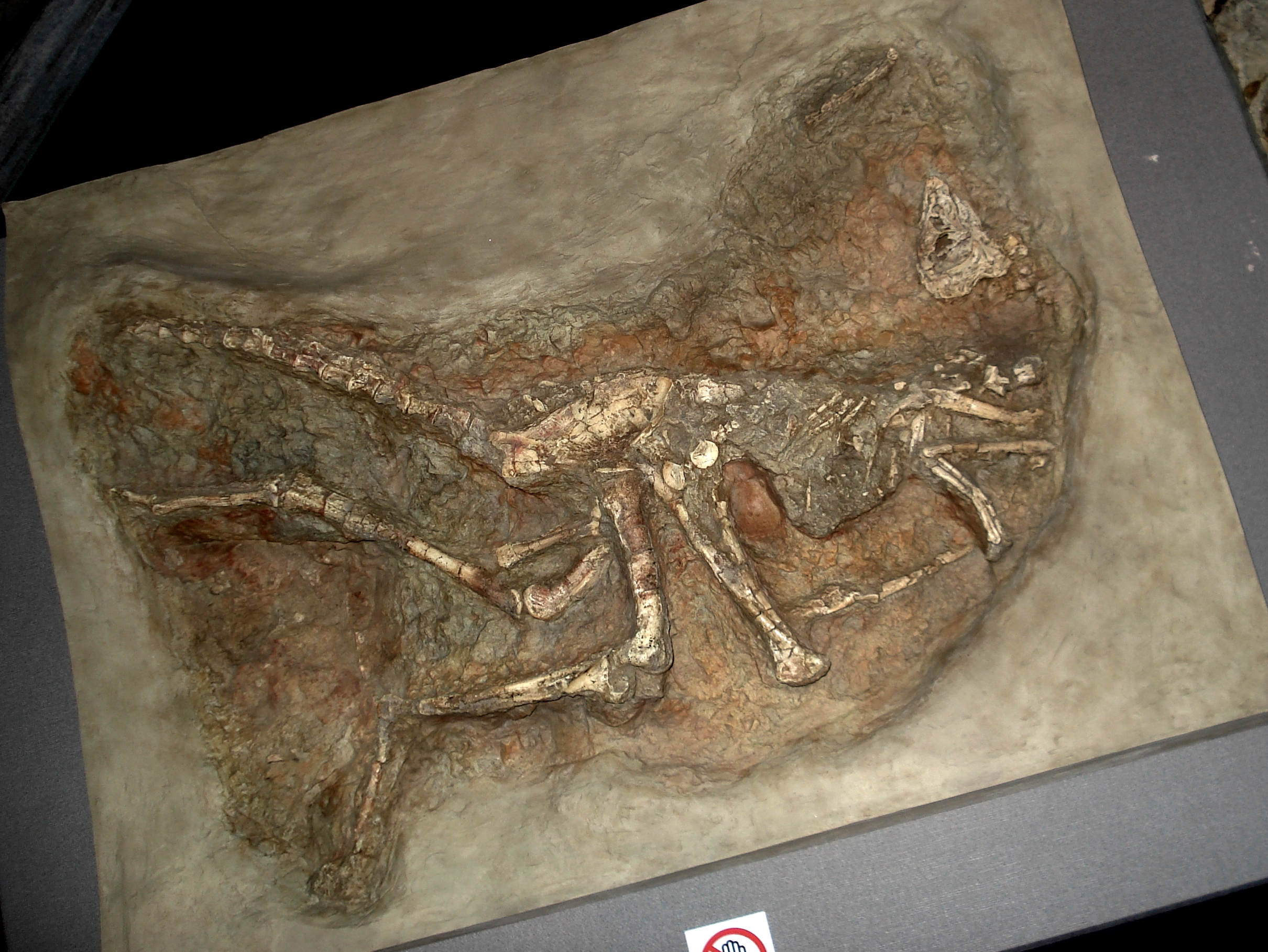
- Skeleton as found

Scientific classification
- Kingdom: Animalia
- Phylum: Chordata
- Class: Reptilia
- Clade: Dinosauria
- Clade: Saurischia
- Clade: Theropoda
- Clade: †Ornithomimosauria
- Family: †Ornithomimidae
- Genus: †Sinornithomimus; Kobayashi & Lü, 2003
- Species: †S. dongi

Binomial name
- †Sinornithomimus dongi Kobayashi & Lü, 2003

= Sinornithomimus =

Sinornithomimus Temporal range: Late Cretaceous, ?Santonian–Campanian (younger than ~92 Ma)

Extinct genus of reptiles

Sinornithomimus is a genus of ornithomimid dinosaur from the Upper Cretaceous Ulansuhai Formation of Alshanzuo Banner, Inner Mongolia, northern China. The first remains were found in 1997 and described six years later in 2003 as the new genus and species Sinornithomimus dongi.

== Discovery and naming ==
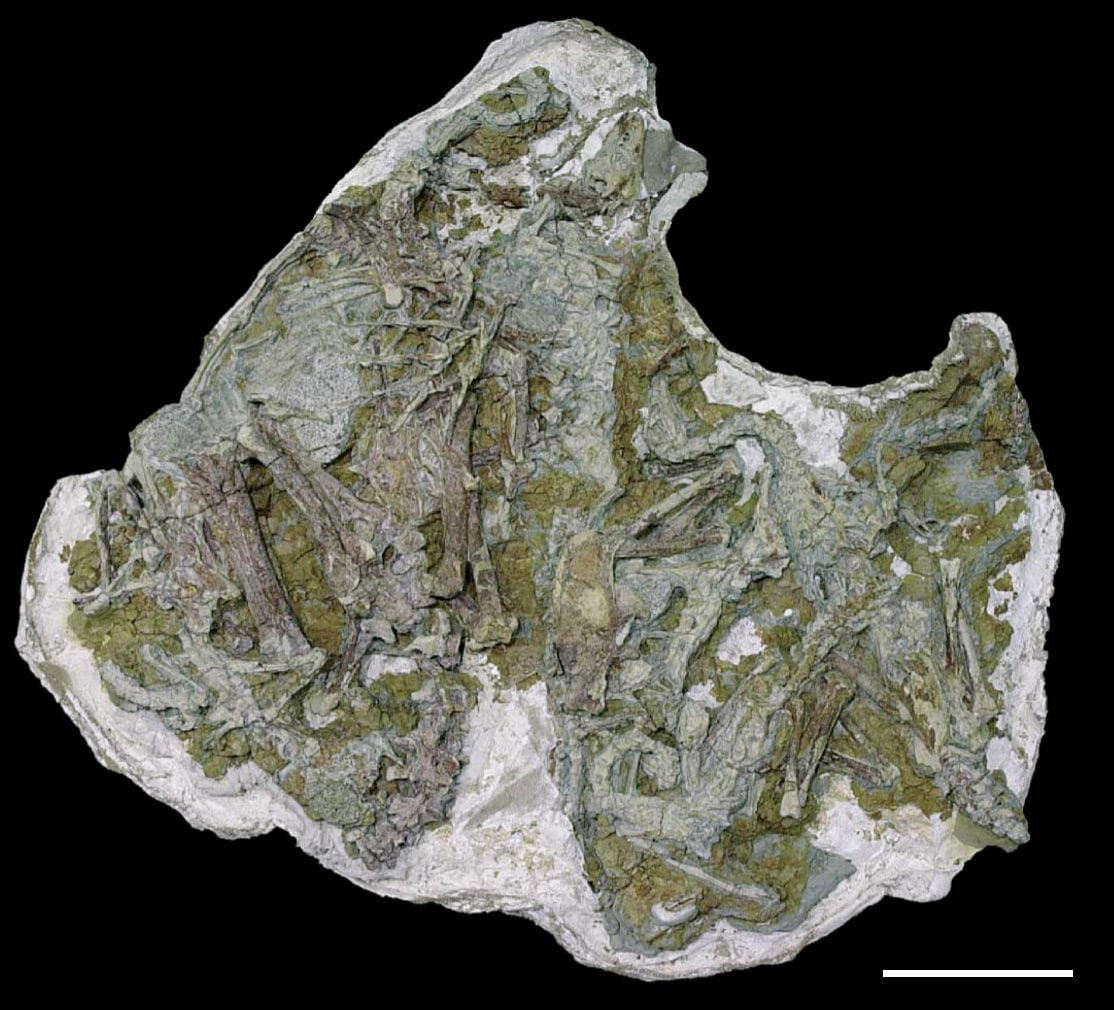
1997 expedition block with 8 specimens. Ages range from 1 year old (IVPP V11797-12) to 8 years old (IVPP V11797-10). None were fully grown.

The first fossil remains of Sinornithomimus were uncovered by Dong Zhiming in the Ulansuhai Formation as part of the Mongol Highland International Dinosaur Project in 1997. They contained at least fourteen skeletons found in close association, nine of which are nearly complete and relatively uncrushed. The find consisted of three sub-adult to adult specimens and eleven juveniles. The unweathered state of the bones, preserved in siltstone interspersed with layers of clay and the absence of evidence for post-mortem movement, argue for a catastrophic event that killed all the individuals present in the find simultaneously and instantaneously.

The type species Sinornithomimus dongi was named and described by Yoshitsugu Kobayashi and Lü Junchang in 2003. The generic name means “Chinese bird mimic” while the specific descriptor honours Dong as the discoverer of the fossils. The holotype, IVPP-V11797-10, is one of the subadult skeletons. The other skeletons have been assigned as paratypes.

Cast of 1-2 year old juveniles (LH PV6 and LH PV5) from the 2001 expedition, held by Paul Sereno

A second expedition in 2001 at the same site led to the discovery of another fossilized herd of thirteen juveniles and subadults of Sinornithomimus. Their positioning suggest that they died together and over a short interval, likely after having become mired in the mud of a drying waterhole. The second discovery also largely consisted of nearly intact exemplars making Sinornithomimus the most completely known ornithomimid.

== Description ==
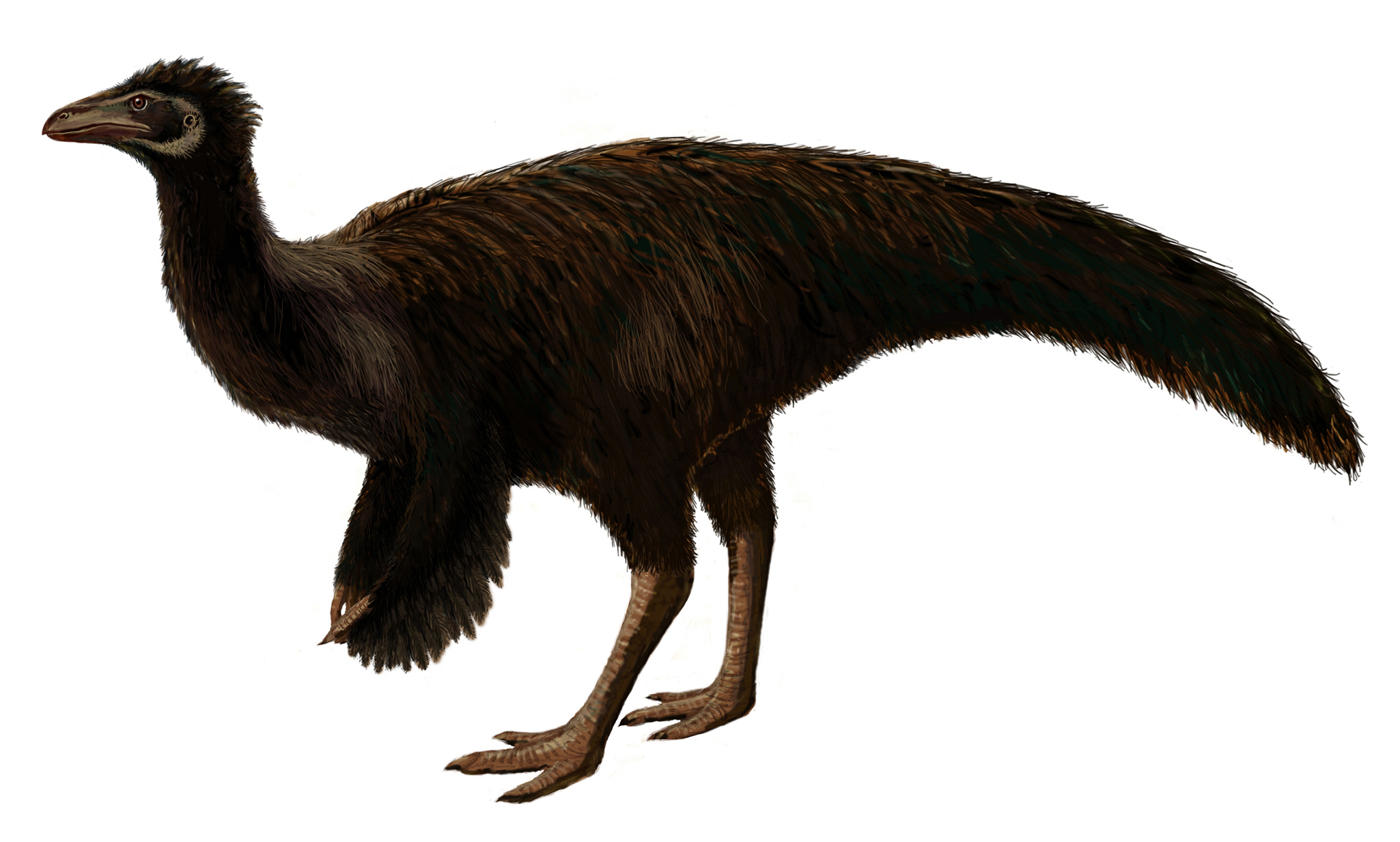
Life restoration.

Sinornithomimus was a small ornithomimid measuring 2.5 m (8.2 ft) in length and weighing about 91 kg (201 lb) with a relatively short neck and head for a member of that group. Autapomorphies (unique derived traits) included the possession of a quadrate with a depression having within a smaller opening which is divided by a vertical sheet of bone; and a depression on the lateral side of the posterior process of the parietal bone.

== Classification ==
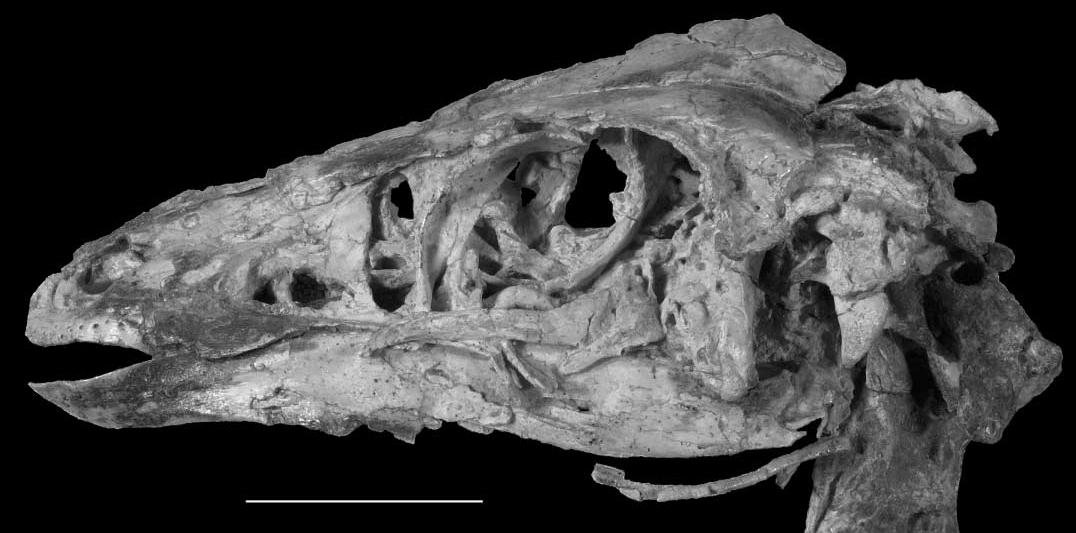
Skull of subadult IVPP V11797−10

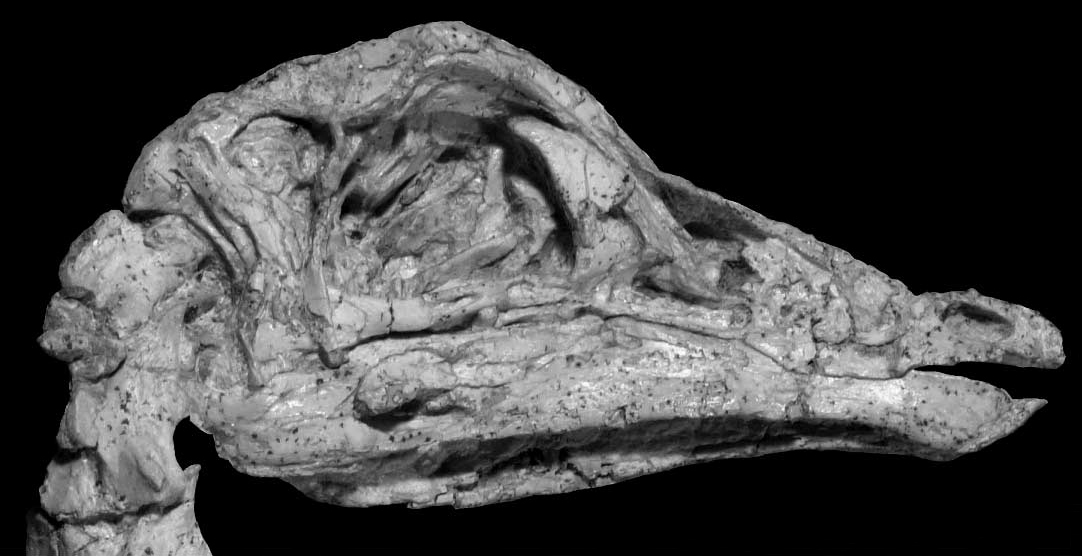
Skull of juvenile IVPP V11797−11

Sinornithomimus was by the describers assigned to the Ornithomimidae. It was a basal ornithomimid that was considered by its describers a more derived form than Archaeornithomimus, though more recent analyses reverse the situation. The structure of the hand is similar to that of Archaeornithomimus representing thus an intermediate between the "primitive" condition of the ornithomimosaur Harpymimus and that of the more derived ornithomimids. Sinornithomimus renders some synapomorphies of ornithomimids plesiomorphic, while also differentiating Asian ornithomimid rhamphothecae from North American ones, based on maxillary vascular foramina found in the latter.

The following cladogram follows that of Xu and colleagues in 2011:

- Ornithomimidae
  - Archaeornithomimus
  - unnamed
    - Sinornithomimus
    - unnamed
      - - Anserimimus
        - Gallimimus
      - unnamed
        - Qiupalong
        - unnamed
          - Struthiomimus
          - Ornithomimus

== Paleobiology ==
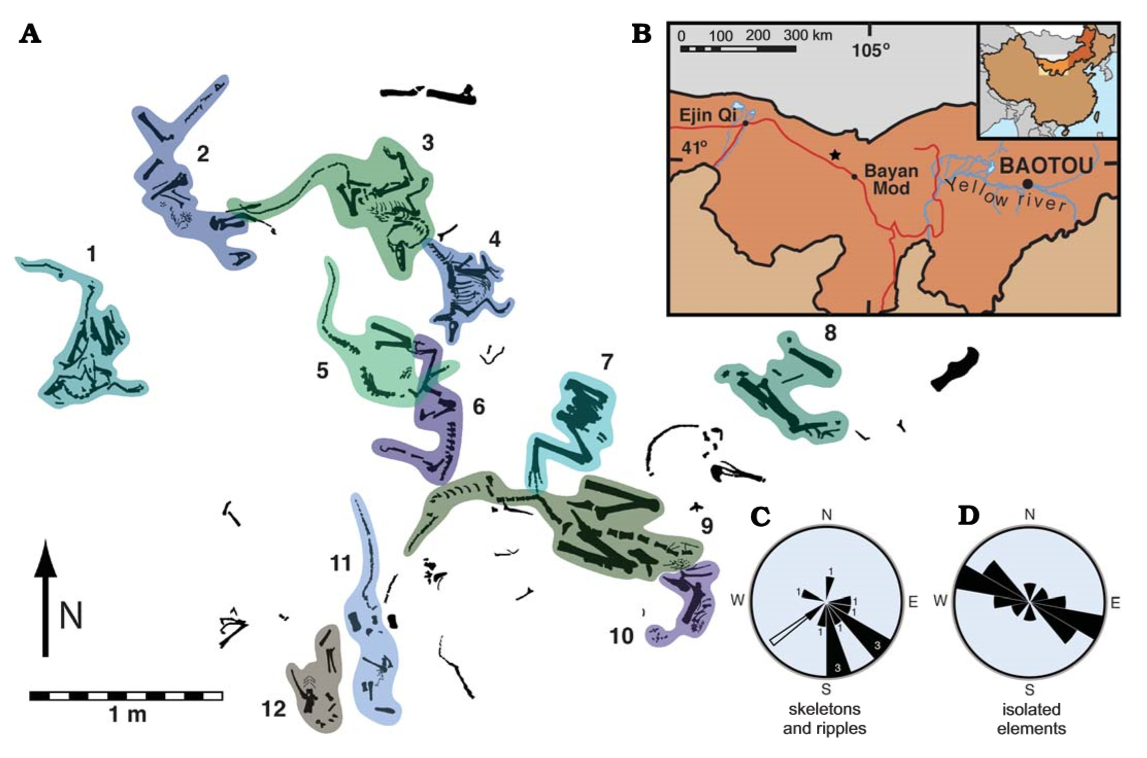
Diagram of the Suhongtu site, which has yielded numerous specimens at different stages.

The herbivory of this genus is supported by the rare presence of gastroliths, as such stones were found forming conspicuous masses in the stomach areas of the fossil skeletons.

This species was gregarious, which is corroborated by the arrangement of the fossil remains in a small bonebed with the juvenile individuals being approximately of the same age. This is furthermore supported by the increase of running ability as the animal progressed in its ontogeny, thus shown in the more cursorial proportions of the adults which possess relatively longer lower legs.

It was assumed by the describers that adults protected themselves and their juveniles from predators by forming familial groups; in 2008 however a study concluded that the all juvenile herds suggest that immature individuals were left to fend for themselves in juvenile groups while adults preoccupied themselves with nesting or brooding.

== See also ==
- Timeline of ornithomimosaur research
