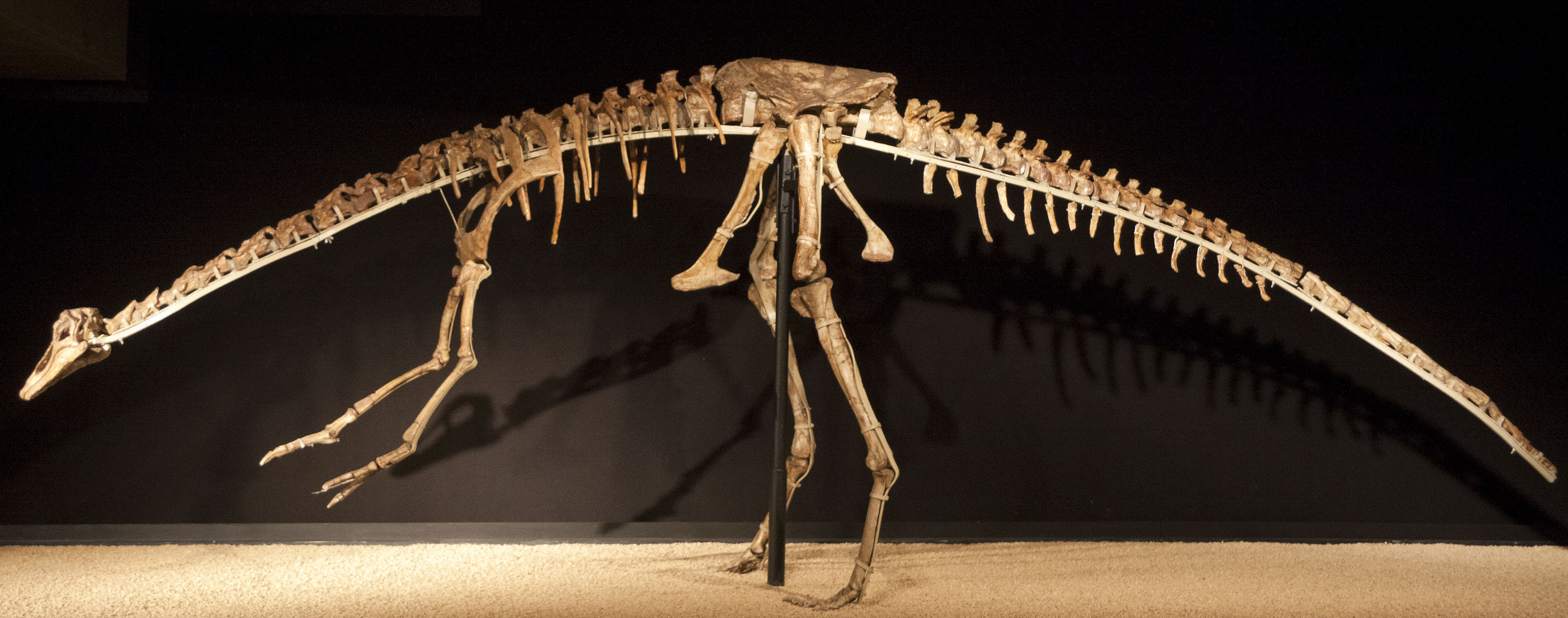
- Mounted skeleton

Scientific classification
- Kingdom: Animalia
- Phylum: Chordata
- Class: Reptilia
- Clade: Dinosauria
- Clade: Saurischia
- Clade: Theropoda
- Clade: †Ornithomimosauria
- Family: †Ornithomimidae
- Genus: †Anserimimus; Barsbold, 1988
- Species: †A. planinychus

Binomial name
- †Anserimimus planinychus Barsbold, 1988

= Anserimimus =

Anserimimus Temporal range: Late Cretaceous, Maastrichtian

Extinct genus of dinosaurs

Anserimimus (/ˌænsərɪˈmaɪməs/ AN-sər-im-EYE-məs; "goose mimic") is a genus of ornithomimid theropod dinosaur, from the Late Cretaceous Period of what is now Mongolia. It was a lanky, fast-running animal, possibly an omnivore. From what fossils are known, it probably closely resembled other ornithomimids, except for its more powerful forelimbs.

== Discovery ==
Anserimimus was found in the Mongolian aimag, or province, of Bayankhongor during a joint Soviet-Mongolian expedition to the Gobi Desert, in the late 1970s. Mongolian paleontologist Rinchen Barsbold named Anserimimus in 1988, combining the Latin anser meaning 'goose' with the Greek mimos meaning 'mimic'. Anser is the generic name of several species of geese. Although Anserimimus does not specifically resemble a goose, ornithomimosaurs have traditionally been named after different types of birds, such as Struthiomimus ('ostrich mimic'), Gallimimus ('rooster mimic'), and Pelecanimimus ('pelican mimic'). The one named species of Anserimimus is called Anserimimus planinychus. The specific name is derived from the Latin planus meaning 'flat', and the Ancient Greek ὄνυξ, onyx, meaning 'claw', in reference to the peculiar flattened claws which characterize the genus.

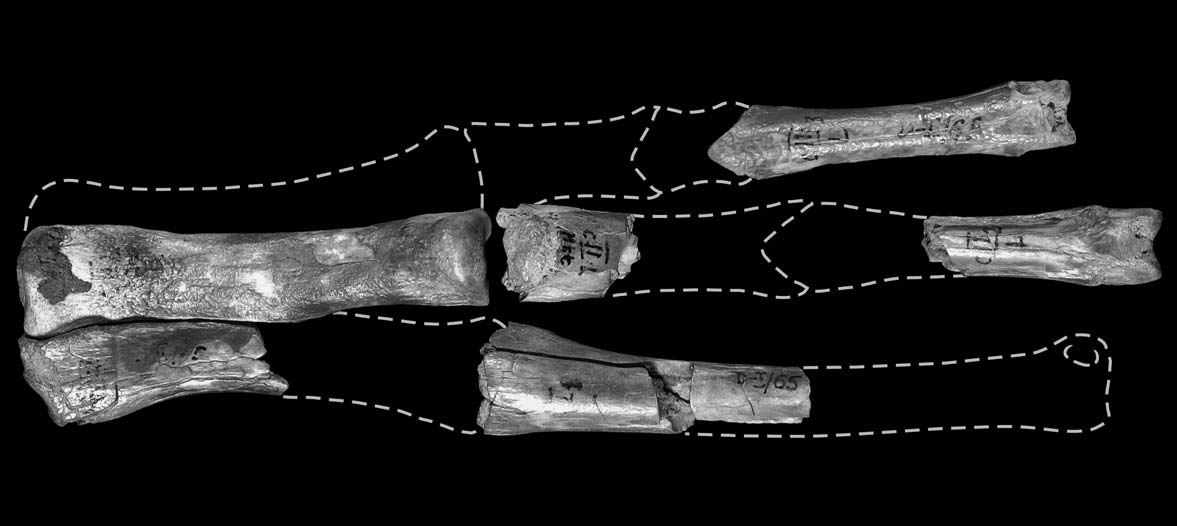
Hand of ZPAL MgD−I/65

There is only a single specimen of Anserimimus, its holotype IGM 100/300. It consists of a rather complete and articulated skeleton lacking the skull and lower jaws. Limited information has been published on the anatomy of Anserimimus, as Barsbold did not describe most of these bones, instead focusing on only those with features that set Anserimimus apart from other ornithomimids. In an unpublished thesis Robert Bronowicz in 2005 gave a detailed description of the species, also referring to additional material to it, among which a second partial skeleton, specimen ZPAL MgD-I/65. However, in 2010 Bronowicz concluded this other find, though most closely related to Anserimimus planinychus, probably represented a separate taxon.

== Description ==
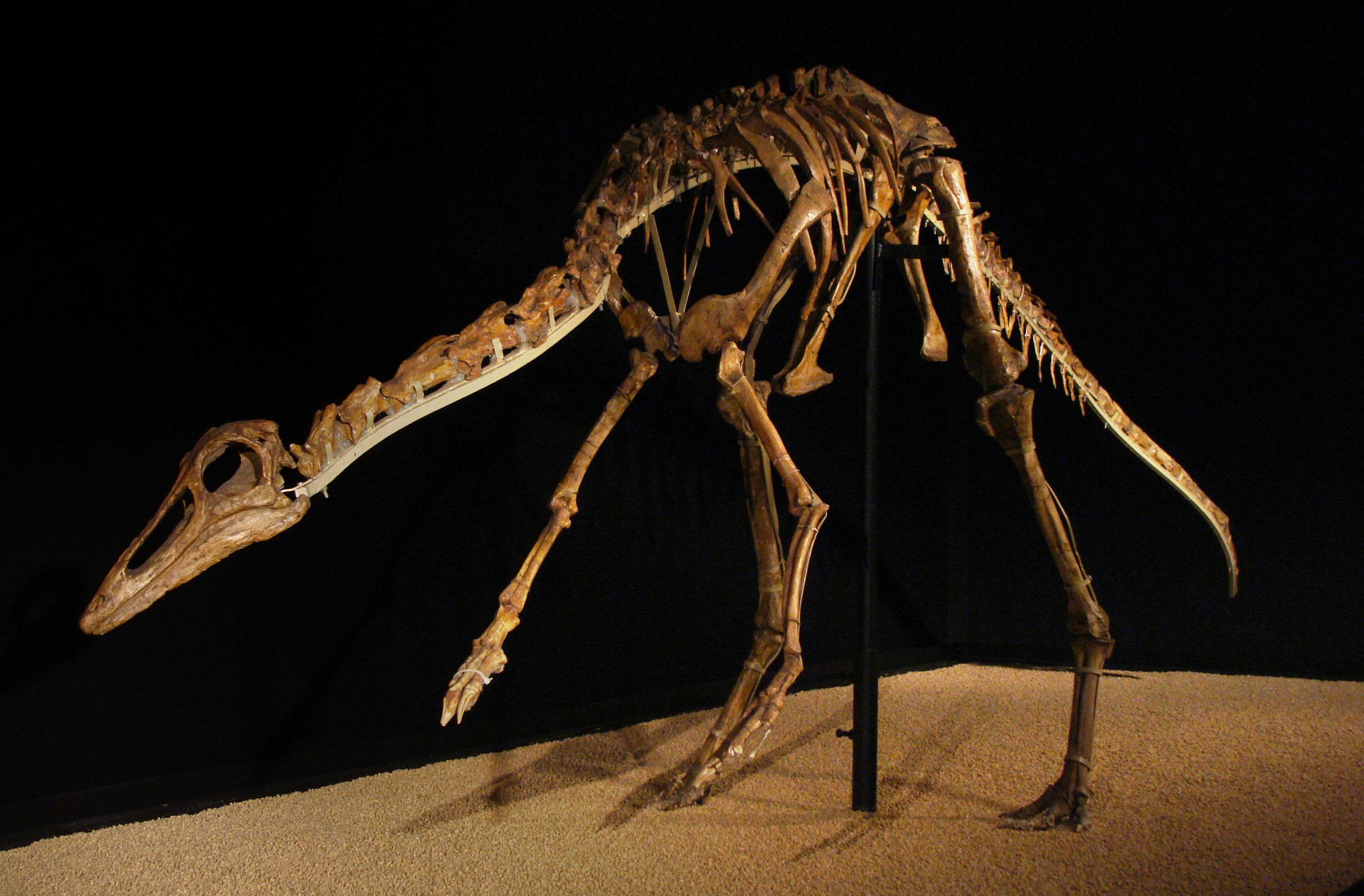
Different view of skeleton

Anserimimus was a medium-sized ornithomimosaurian. Gregory S. Paul in 2010 estimated its length at 3 metres (9.8 ft), and its weight at 50 kilograms (110 lb). Other studies suggested that the holotype was heavier, weighing up to 143.6–170 kilograms (317–375 lb). The thighbone is 435 millimetres long.

There are several key differences between it and related species, though most of these are shared with ZPAL MgD-I/65. The claws on the hand are long, low at the back, and rather straight, only slightly curved, with the lower surface nearly flat. The forelimb is long and also built more powerfully than that of other ornithomimids, with large crests on the scapulocoracoid of the shoulder and humerus (upper arm bone), which provided attachment points for large arm muscles like the biceps. The metacarpus of the hand is fused, adding to the strength. The foot is strongly arctometatarsalian, with the third metatarsal excluded from the front surface of the metatarsus over 40% of its upper length.

== Phylogeny ==
Anserimimus was by Barsbold assigned to the Ornithomimidae, a group of derived Ornithomimosauria. This has been confirmed by modern cladistic analysis. Its closest relative may be Gallimimus from the same formation albeit from a different area (Kobayashi & Lu, 2003; Kobayashi & Barsbold, 2005). Other studies have been unable specifically to determine its relationships or those of any other ornithomimids (Ji et al., 2003; Makovicky et al., 2004).

The following cladogram is based on Xu et al., 2011:

- Ornithomimidae
  - Archaeornithomimus
  - unnamed
    - Sinornithomimus
    - unnamed
      - - Anserimimus
        - Gallimimus
      - unnamed
        - Qiupalong
        - unnamed
          - Struthiomimus
          - Ornithomimus

== Paleobiology ==
Life restoration

The function of the powerful arm, with its straightened claws, remains unknown. It may indicate a different diet of food-gathering strategy than other ornithomimids, although its diet is difficult to determine, since the animal's skull is unknown. Scientists have long hypothesized that ornithomimids, descended from carnivorous theropod ancestors, were actually omnivores or even herbivores.

== Paleoecology ==
Anserimimus was recovered from the Nemegt Formation of Mongolia. The Nemegt is thought to represent alluvial plains containing meandering rivers. The layer Anserimimus was found, is dated from the early Maastrichtian stage of the Late Cretaceous, or about 70 million years ago.

Aside from Gallimimus, other theropods found in the Nemegt Formation include the gigantic Tarbosaurus and Deinocheirus, as well as smaller dromaeosaurids, oviraptorosaurs, troodontids, and birds. Herbivores are represented by the hadrosaurids Barsboldia and Saurolophus, the ankylosaurid Tarchia and several titanosaurian sauropods and pachycephalosaurians. The rock facies of this formation suggest the presence of stream and river channels, mudflats, and shallow lakes. Sediments also indicate that there existed a rich habitat, offering diverse food in abundant amounts that could sustain massive Cretaceous dinosaurs.

== See also ==
- Timeline of ornithomimosaur research
