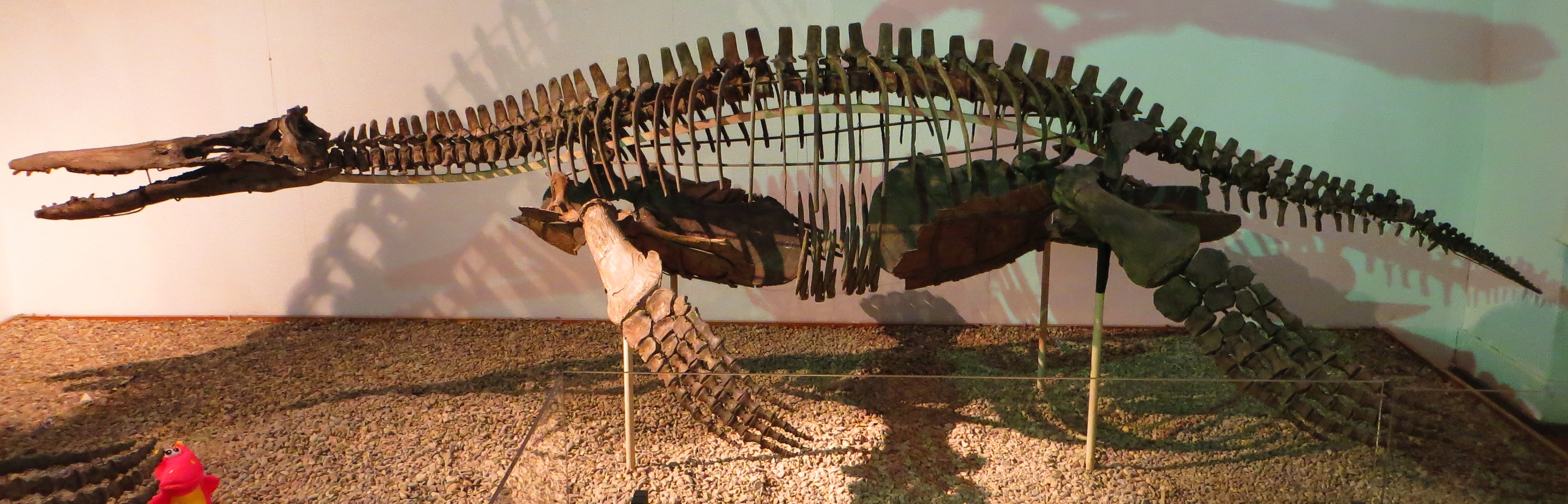
- Skeletal mount, Museum of Paleontology, Tuebingen

Scientific classification
- Kingdom: Animalia
- Phylum: Chordata
- Class: Reptilia
- Superorder: †Sauropterygia
- Order: †Plesiosauria
- Suborder: †Pliosauroidea
- Family: †Pliosauridae
- Genus: †Peloneustes; Lydekker, 1889
- Species: †P. philarchus

Binomial name
- †Peloneustes philarchus (Seeley, 1869)

Synonyms
- Plesiosaurus philarchus Seeley, 1869; Thaumatosaurus philarchus (Lydekker, 1888); Pliosaurus philarchus (Seeley, 1892); Peloneustes philarchus var. spathyrhynchus Linder, 1913

= Peloneustes =

Peloneustes Temporal range: Middle Jurassic, Callovian ~(165.3–161.5 Ma)

Genus of pliosaurid plesiosaur

Peloneustes (meaning 'mud swimmer') is a genus of pliosaurid plesiosaur from the Middle Jurassic of England. Its remains are known from the Peterborough Member of the Oxford Clay Formation, which is Callovian in age. It was originally described as a species of Plesiosaurus by palaeontologist Harry Govier Seeley in 1869, before being given its own genus by naturalist Richard Lydekker in 1889. While many species have been assigned to this genus, P. philarchus is currently the only one still considered valid, with the others moved to different genera, considered nomina dubia, or synonymised with P. philarchus. The taxon is known from many specimens, including some very complete material.

With a total length of 3.5–4 metres (11–13 ft), Peloneustes is not a large pliosaurid. It had a large, triangular skull, which occupied about a fifth of its body length. The front of the skull is elongated into a narrow rostrum (snout). The mandibular symphysis, where the front ends of each side of the mandible (lower jaw) fuse, is elongated in Peloneustes, and helped strengthen the jaw. An elevated ridge is located between the tooth rows on the mandibular symphysis. The teeth of Peloneustes are conical and have circular cross-sections, bearing vertical ridges on all sides. The front teeth are larger than the back teeth. With only 19 to 21 cervical (neck) vertebrae, Peloneustes had a short neck for a plesiosaur. The limbs of Peloneustes were modified into flippers, with the back pair larger than the front.

Peloneustes has been interpreted as both a close relative of Pliosaurus or as a more basal (early-diverging) pliosaurid within Thalassophonea, with the latter interpretation finding more support. Like other plesiosaurs, Peloneustes was well-adapted to aquatic life, using its flippers for a method of swimming known as subaqueous flight. Pliosaurid skulls were reinforced to better withstand the stresses of feeding. The long, narrow snout of Peloneustes could have been swung quickly through the water to catch fish, which it pierced with its numerous sharp teeth. Peloneustes would have inhabited an epicontinental (inland) sea that was around 30–50 metres (100–160 ft) deep. It shared its habitat with a variety of other animals, including invertebrates, fish, thalattosuchians, ichthyosaurs, and other plesiosaurs. At least five other pliosaurids are known from the Peterborough Member, but they were quite varied in anatomy, indicating that they would have eaten different food sources, thereby avoiding competition.

== History of research ==
Partial upper jaw of the holotype specimen, in top and bottom views

The strata of the Peterborough Member of the Oxford Clay Formation have long been mined for brickmaking. Ever since the late 19th century, when these operations began, the fossils of many marine animals have been excavated from the rocks. Among these was the specimen which would become the holotype of Peloneustes philarchus, discovered by geologist Henry Porter in a clay pit close to Peterborough, England. The specimen includes a mandible, the front part of the upper jaw, various vertebrae from throughout the body, elements from the shoulder girdle and pelvis, humeri (upper arm bones), femora (upper leg bones), and various other limb bones. In 1866, geologist Adam Sedgwick purchased the specimen for the University of Cambridge's Woodwardian Museum (now the Sedgwick Museum of Earth Sciences, Cambridge), with the specimen being catalogued as CAMSM J.46913 and stored in the university's lecture room within cabinet D. Palaeontologist Harry Govier Seeley described the specimen as a new species of the preexisting genus Plesiosaurus, Plesiosaurus philarchus, in 1869. The specific name means 'power-loving', possibly due to its large, powerful skull. Seeley did not describe this specimen in detail, mainly just giving a list of the known material. While later publications would further describe these remains, CAMSM J.46913 remained poorly described.

Alfred Leeds and his brother Charles Leeds had been collecting fossils from the Oxford Clay since around 1867, encouraged by geologist John Phillips of the University of Oxford, assembling what became known as the Leeds Collection. While Charles eventually left, Alfred, who collected the majority of the specimens, continued to gather fossils until 1917. Eventually, after a visit by Henry Woodward of the British Museum of Natural History (now the Natural History Museum in London) to Leeds' collection in Eyebury in 1885, the museum bought around 5 tonnes (5.5 short tons) of fossils in 1890. This brought Leeds' collection to wider renown, and he would later sell specimens to museums throughout Europe, and even some in the United States. The carefully prepared material was usually in good condition, although it quite frequently had been crushed and broken by geological processes. Skulls were particularly vulnerable to this.

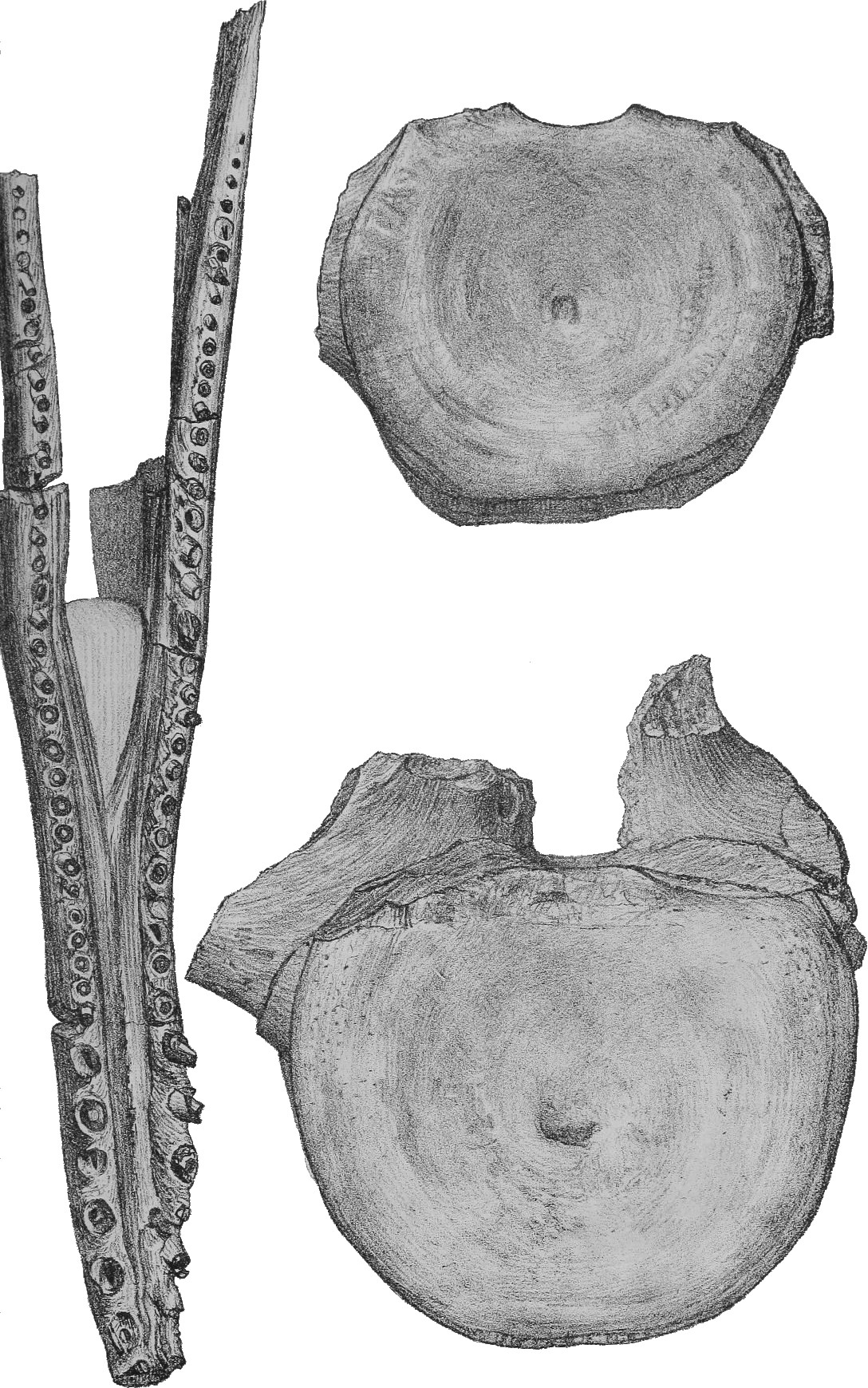
Mandible and vertebrae of the specimen (NHMUK PV R1253) described by Lydekker

Naturalist Richard Lydekker was informed of a plesiosaur skeleton in the British Museum of Natural History by geologist George Charles Crick, who worked there. The specimen, catalogued under NHMUK PV R1253, had been discovered in the Oxford Clay Formation in Green End, Kempston, near Bedford. While Lydekker speculated that the skeleton was once complete, it was damaged during excavation. The limb girdles had been heavily fragmented when the specimen arrived at the museum, but a worker named Lingard in the Geology Department managed to restore much of them. In addition to the limb girdles, the specimen also consists of a partial mandible, teeth, multiple vertebrae (although none from the neck), and much of the limbs. Lydekker identified this specimen as an individual of Plesiosaurus philarchus and published a description of it in 1889. After studying this and other specimens in the Leeds Collection, he concluded that plesiosaurs with shortened necks and large heads could not be classified as species of Plesiosaurus, meaning that "P." philarchus belonged to a different genus. He initially assigned it to Thaumatosaurus in 1888, but later decided that it was distinct enough to warrant its own genus, which he named Peloneustes in his 1889 publication. The name Peloneustes comes from the Greek words pelos, meaning 'mud' or 'clay', in reference to the Oxford Clay Formation, and neustes, meaning 'swimmer'. Seeley, however, lumped Peloneustes into Pliosaurus in 1892, claiming that the two were insufficiently different to warrant separate genera. Seeley and Lydekker could not agree on which genus to classify P. philarchus in, representing part of a feud between the two scientists. However, Peloneustes has since become the accepted name.

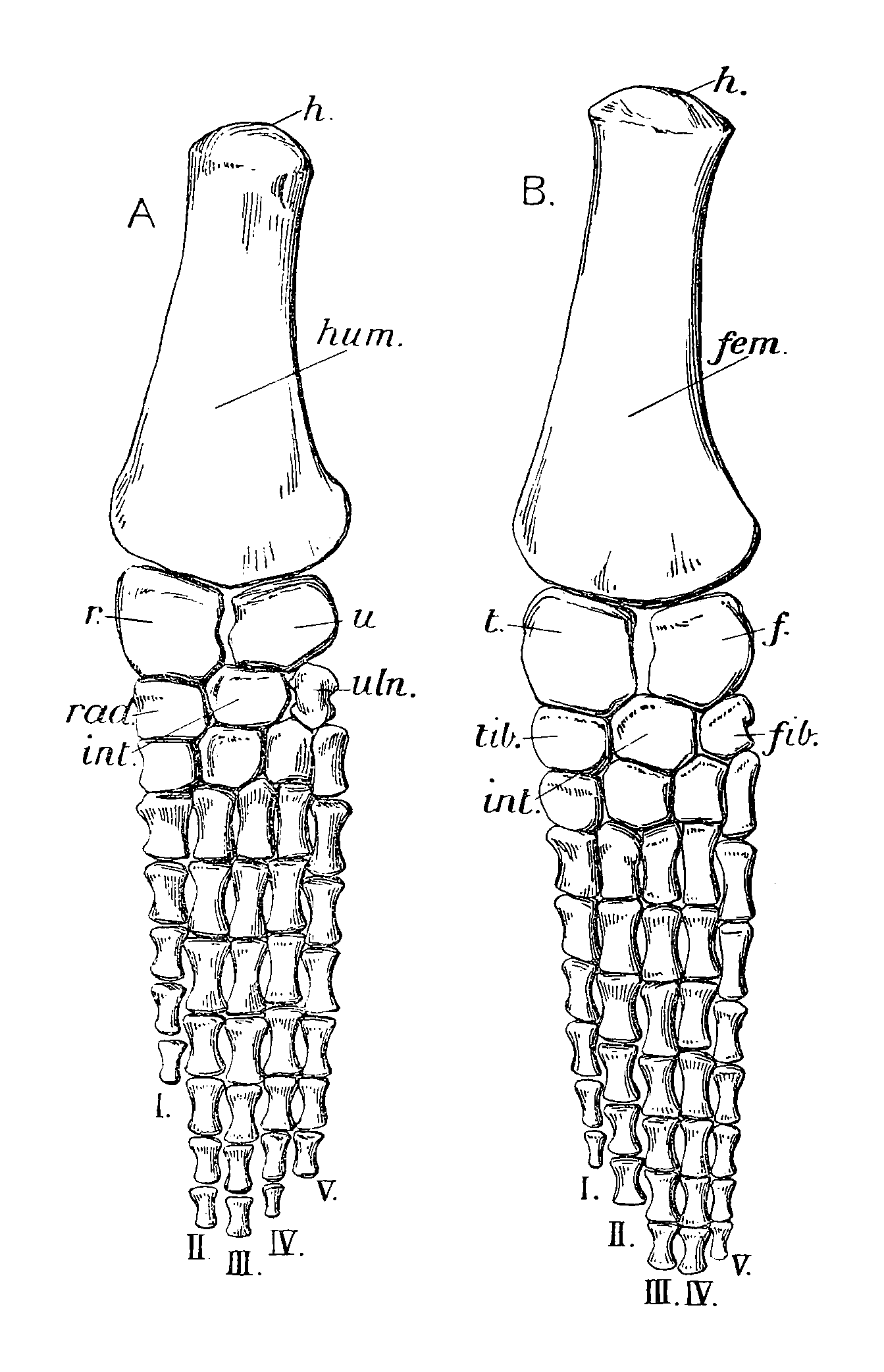
Fore (left) and hind (right) paddles of NHMUK PV R2440, a specimen from the Leeds Collection

The Leeds Collection contained multiple Peloneustes specimens. In 1895, palaeontologist Charles William Andrews described the anatomy of the skull of Peloneustes based on four partial skulls in the Leeds Collection. In 1907, geologist Frédéric Jaccard published a description of two Peloneustes specimens from the Oxford Clay near Peterborough, housed in the Musée Paléontologique de Lausanne, Switzerland. The more complete of the two specimens includes a complete skull preserving both jaws; multiple isolated teeth; 13 cervical (neck), 5 pectoral (shoulder), and 7 caudal (tail) vertebrae; ribs; both scapulae, a coracoid; a partial interclavicale; a complete pelvis save for an ischium; and all four limbs, which were nearly complete. The other specimen preserved 33 vertebrae and some associated ribs. Since the specimen Lydekker described was in some need of restoration, and missing information was filled in with data from other specimens in his publication, Jaccard found it pertinent to publish a description containing photographs of the more complete specimen in Lausanne to better illustrate the anatomy of Peloneustes.

In 1913, naturalist Hermann Linder described multiple specimens of Peloneustes philarchus housed in the Institut für Geowissenschaften, University of Tübingen and State Museum of Natural History Stuttgart, Germany. These specimens had also come from the Leeds Collection. Among the specimens he described from the former institution was a nearly complete mounted skeleton, lacking two cervical vertebrae, some caudal vertebrae from the end of the tail, and some distal phalanges. Only the rear part of the cranium was in good condition, but the mandible was mostly undamaged. Another of the specimens Linder described was a well-preserved skull (GPIT RE/3409), also from the University of Tübingen, preserving a scleral ring (the set of small bones that support the eye), only the fourth time these bones had been reported in a plesiosaur.

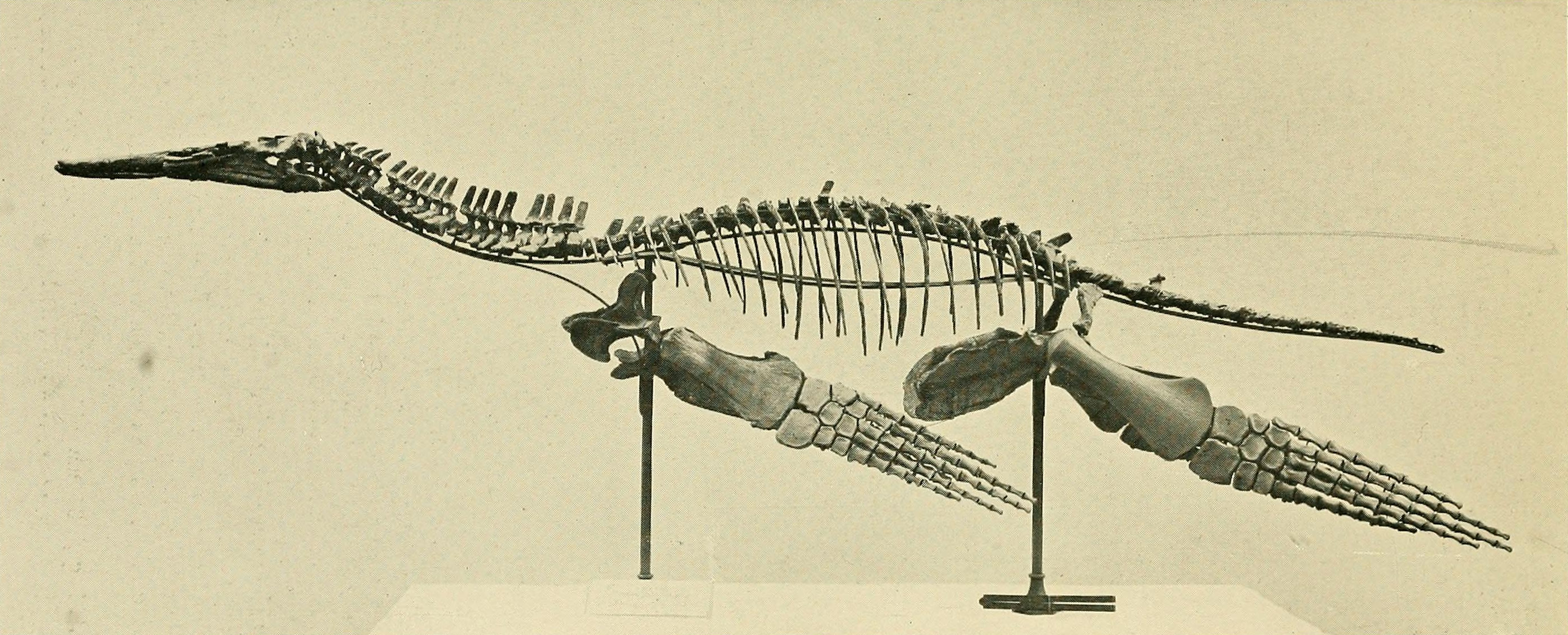
Mounted skeleton in the British Museum of Natural History (NHMUK PV R3318)

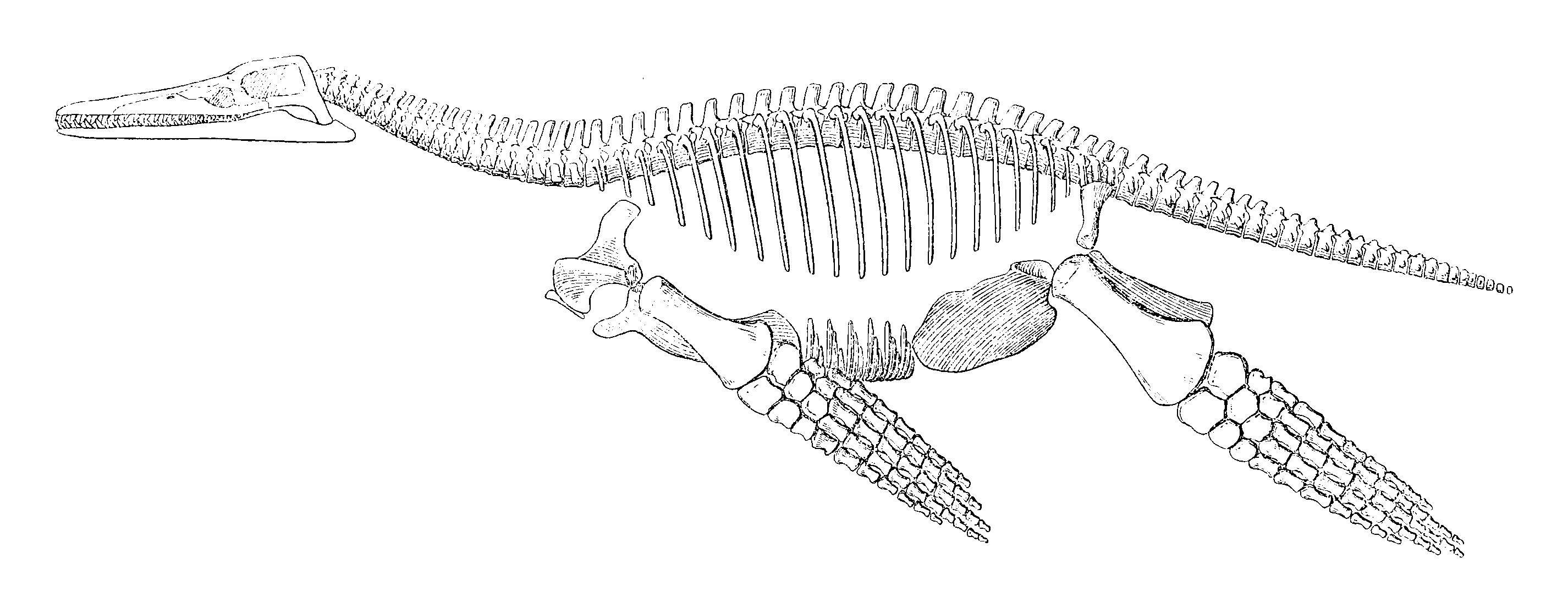
1913 skeletal reconstruction based on the above mount

Andrews later described the marine reptile specimens of the Leeds Collection that were in the British Museum of Natural History, publishing two volumes, one in 1910 and the other in 1913. The anatomy of the Peloneustes specimens was described in the second volume, based primarily on the well-preserved skulls NHMUK R2679 and NHMUK R3808 and NHMUK R3318, an almost complete skeleton. NHMUK R3318 was so well preserved that it could be rearticulated and mounted, although the missing parts of the pelvis and limbs had to be filled in. The mounted skeleton was put on display in the museum's Gallery of Fossil Reptiles. Andrews had described this mount in 1910, remarking that it was the first skeletal mount of a pliosaurid, thus providing important information about the overall anatomy of the group.

In 1960, palaeontologist Lambert Beverly Tarlo published a review of pliosaurid species that had been reported from the Upper Jurassic. Many pliosaurids species had been named based on often isolated fragments, creating confusion. Tarlo also found that inaccurate descriptions of the material and palaeontologists ignoring each other's work only made this confusion worse. Of the 36 species he reviewed, he found only nine of them to be valid, including Peloneustes philarchus. In 2011, palaeontologists Hilary Ketchum and Roger Benson described the anatomy of the skull of Peloneustes. Since the previous anatomical studies of Andrews and Linder, more specimens had been found, including NHMUK R4058, a skull preserved in three dimensions, providing a better idea of the skull's shape.

=== Formerly assigned species and specimens ===
Many further species have been assigned to Peloneustes throughout its taxonomic history, but these have all since been reassigned to different genera or considered invalid. In the same publication in which he named P. philarchus, Seeley also named another species of Plesiosaurus, P. sterrodeirus based on seven specimens in the Woodwardian Museum consisting of cranial and vertebral material. When Lydekker erected the genus Peloneustes for P. philarchus, he also reclassified "Plesiosaurus" sterrodeirus and "Pleiosaurus" aequalis (a species named by John Phillips in 1871) as members of this genus. In his 1960 review of pliosaurid taxonomy, Tarlo considered P. aequalis to be invalid, since it was based on propodials (upper limb bones), which cannot be used to differentiate different pliosaurid species. He considered Peloneustes sterrodeirus to instead belong to Pliosaurus, possibly within P. brachydeirus.

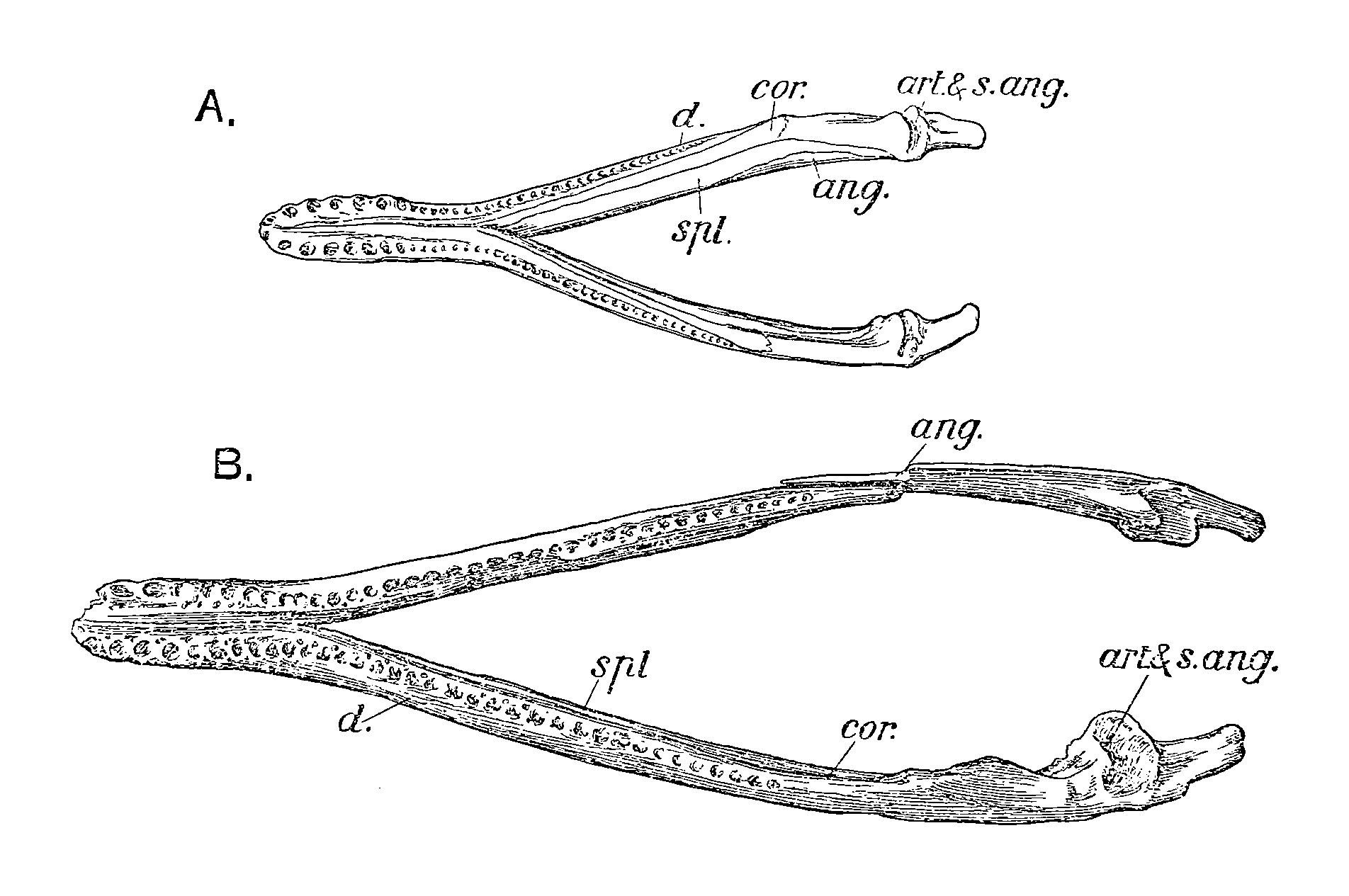
Mandibles of Peloneustes, specimen NHMUK R3803 (top) and "Pliosaurus" andrewsi, specimen NHMUK R2443 (bottom)

Another of the species described by Seeley in 1869 was Pliosaurus evansi, based on specimens in the Woodwardian Museum. These consisted of cervical and dorsal (back) vertebrae, ribs, and a coracoid. Due to it being a smaller species of Pliosaurus and its similarity to Peloneustes philarchus, Lydekker reassigned it to Peloneustes in 1890, noting that it was larger than Peloneustes philarchus. He also thought that a large mandible and paddle attributed to Pleiosaurus ?grandis by Phillips in 1871 belonged to this species instead. In 1913, Andrews assigned a partial skeleton of another large pliosaur found by Leeds to Peloneustes evansi, noting that while the mandible and vertebrae were similar to other Peloneustes evansi specimens, they were quite different from those of Peloneustes philarchus. Consequently, Andrews considered it possible that P. evansi really belonged to a separate genus that was morphologically intermediate between Peloneustes and Pliosaurus. In his 1960 review of pliosaurids, Tarlo synonymised Peloneustes evansi with Peloneustes philarchus due to their cervical vertebrae being identical (save for a difference in size). He considered the larger specimens of Peloneustes evansi distinct, and assigned them to a new species of Pliosaurus, P. andrewsi (although this species is no longer considered to belong in Pliosaurus). Hilary F. Ketchum and Roger B. J. Benson disagreed with this synonymy, and in 2011 considered that since the holotype of Peloneustes evansi is nondiagnostic (lacking distinguishing features), P. evansi is a nomen dubium and therefore an indeterminate pliosaurid.

In 1905, palaeontologist Ernst Koken described another species of Plesiosaurus, P. kanzleri, from two Early Cretaceous dorsal vertebrae discovered in a clay pit near Gronau, northern Germany. He nevertheless suggested that this species might belong to Peloneustes, owing to the morphology of these vertebrae. While Tarlo later interpreted these fossils as belonging to an elasmosaurid, Sven Sachs and colleagues concluded in 2016 that they are comparable to those of the possible leptocleidid Brancasaurus. They nevertheless emphasized that the material lacks a diagnostic combination of characters that would allow a confident taxonomic assignment, and P. kanzleri therefore remains a nomen dubium. In 1913, Linder created a subspecies of Peloneustes, P. philarchus var. spathyrhynchus, differentiating it based on its spatulate mandibular symphysis (where the two sides of the mandible meet and fuse). Tarlo considered it to be a synonym of Peloneustes philarchus in 1960, and the mandibular symphysis of Peloneustes is proportionately wider in larger specimens, making this trait more likely to be due to intraspecific variation (variation within species). Crushing makes accurate measurement of these proportions difficult.

In 1909 and 1936, respectively, palaeontologist Anatoly Riabinin described material from the Callovian or Oxfordian of Kostroma Oblast and the Oxfordian of Hooker Island, Franz Josef Land, which he tentatively assigned to Peloneustes philarchus; however, these assignments have since been doubted. In 1937, Friedrich von Huene assigned a fragmentary tooth possibly dating from the Callovian and coming from the Baltic region of Courland to Peloneustes sp., but this assignment was rejected by Ketchum and Benson in 2011. In 1948, palaeontologist Nestor Novozhilov named a new species of Peloneustes, P. irgisensis, based on PIN 426, a partial skeleton consisting of a large, incomplete skull, vertebrae, and a partial hind limb, with stomach contents preserved. The specimen was unearthed in the Lower Volga Basin in Russia. In his 1960 review, Tarlo considered this species to be too different from Peloneustes philarchus to belong to Peloneustes, tentatively placing it in Pliosaurus. He speculated that Novozhilov had incorrectly thought Peloneustes to be the sole long-snouted pliosaurid, hence the initial assignment. In 1964 Novozhilov erected a new genus, Strongylokrotaphus, for this species, but further studies concurred with Tarlo and reassigned the species to Pliosaurus, possibly a synonym of Pliosaurus rossicus. More recent studies considered the taxon as a nomen dubium given its currently undiagnostic character, but nevertheless recommend a new description of the holotype. However, this suggestion risks being tainted by the current state of conservation of specimen PIN 426, the skull and notably the mandible having since been seriously damaged by pyrite decay, and the associated elements being noted as lost.

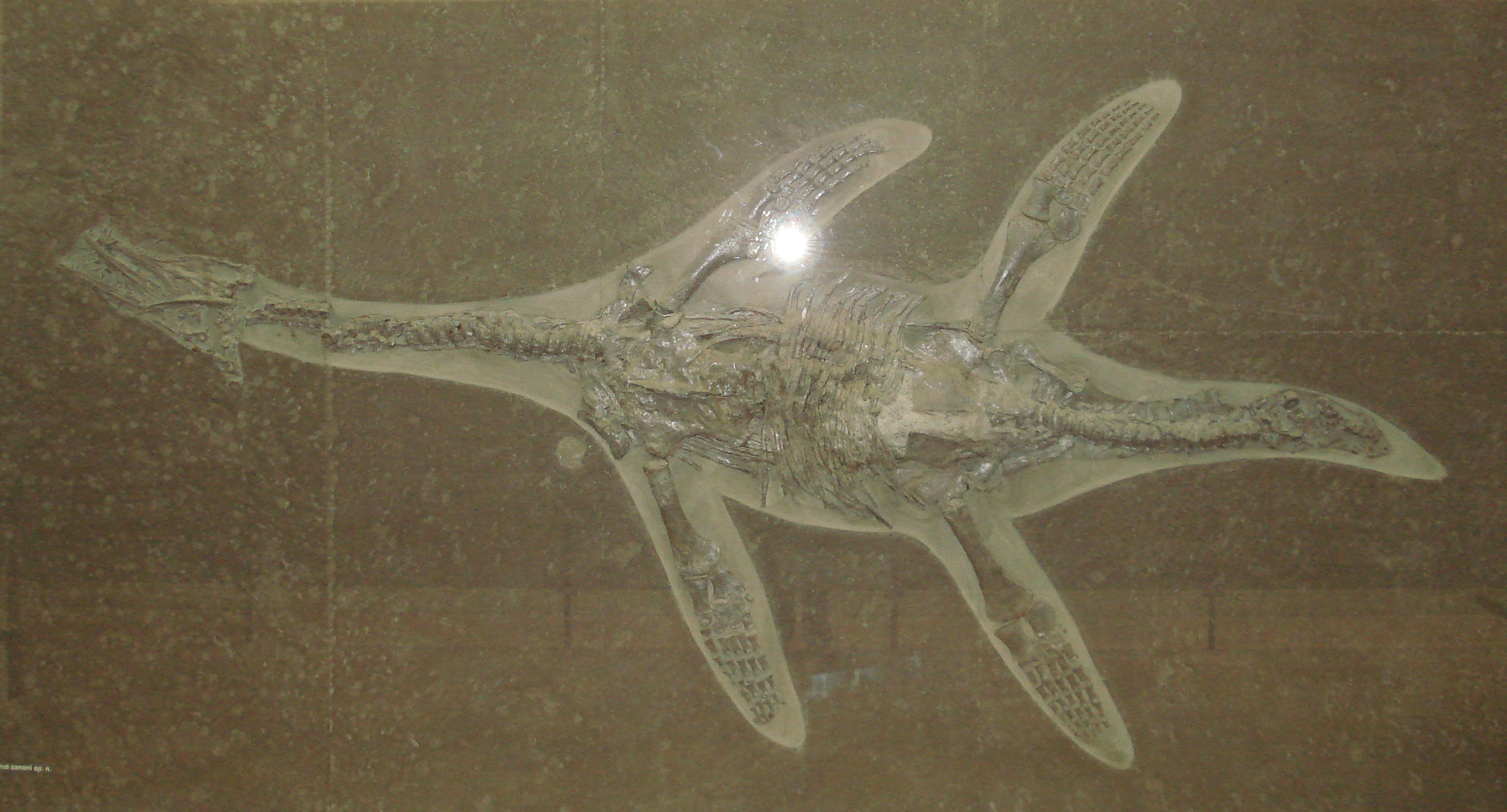
Skeleton of Hauffiosaurus, first thought to be Peloneustes, Urwelt-Museum Hauff

In 1972, paleontologist Teresa Maryańska attributed cranial fragments to Peloneustes sp. which were discovered in an Oxfordian quarry in Załęcze Wielkie, Poland. In 2011, Ketchum and Benson reidentified this specimen as actually coming from an undetermined marine teleosaurid crocodylomorph. In 1998, palaeontologist Frank Robin O'Keefe proposed that a pliosaurid specimen from the Lower Jurassic Posidonia Shale of Germany might represent a new species of Peloneustes. However, in 2001, he considered it to belong to a separate genus and species, naming it Hauffiosaurus zanoni. Palaeontologists Zulma Gasparini and Manuel A. Iturralde-Vinent assigned a pliosaurid from the Upper Jurassic Jagua Formation of Cuba to Peloneustes sp. in 2006. In 2009, Gasparini redescribed it as Gallardosaurus iturraldei. In 2011, Ketchum and Benson considered Peloneustes to contain only one species, P. philarchus. They recognised twenty one definite specimens of Peloneustes philarchus, all from the Peterborough Member of the Oxford Clay Formation. They considered some specimens from the Peterborough Member and Marquise, France previously assigned to Peloneustes to belong to different, currently unnamed pliosaurids.

== Description ==
Size comparison of two specimens

Peloneustes is a small- to medium-sized member of Pliosauridae. NHMUK R3318, the mounted skeleton in the Natural History Museum in London, is 3.5 metres (11.5 ft) long, while the mounted skeleton in the Institut für Geowissenschaften, University of Tübingen measures 4.05 metres (13.3 ft) in length. This latter, numbered as GPIT-RE-3182, would have reached an estimated body length of approximately 4.34 metres (14.2 ft) during its lifetime, for a body mass of around 1 metric ton (1.1 short tons). Plesiosaurs typically can be described as being of the small-headed, long-necked "plesiosauromorph" morphotype or the large-headed, short-necked "pliosauromorph" morphotype. Peloneustes is of the latter morphotype, with its skull making up a little less than a fifth of the animal's total length. Peloneustes, like all plesiosaurs, had a short tail, massive torso, and all of its limbs modified into large flippers.

=== Skull ===
Reconstructed skull

While the holotype of Peloneustes lacks the rear portion of its cranium, many additional well-preserved specimens, including one that has not been crushed from top to bottom, have been assigned to this genus. These crania vary in size, measuring 60–78.5 centimetres (1.97–2.58 ft) in length. The cranium of Peloneustes is elongated, and slopes upwards towards its back end. Viewed from above, the cranium is shaped like an isosceles triangle, with the back of the cranium broad and the front elongated into a narrow rostrum. The rearmost part of the cranium has roughly parallel sides, unlike the tapering front regions. The external nares (openings for the nostrils) are small and located about halfway along the length of the cranium. The kidney-shaped eye sockets face forwards and outwards and are located on the back half of the cranium. The scleral rings are composed of at least 16 individual elements, an unusually high number for a reptile. The temporal fenestrae (openings in the back of the cranium) are enlarged, elliptical, and located on the cranium's rearmost quarter.

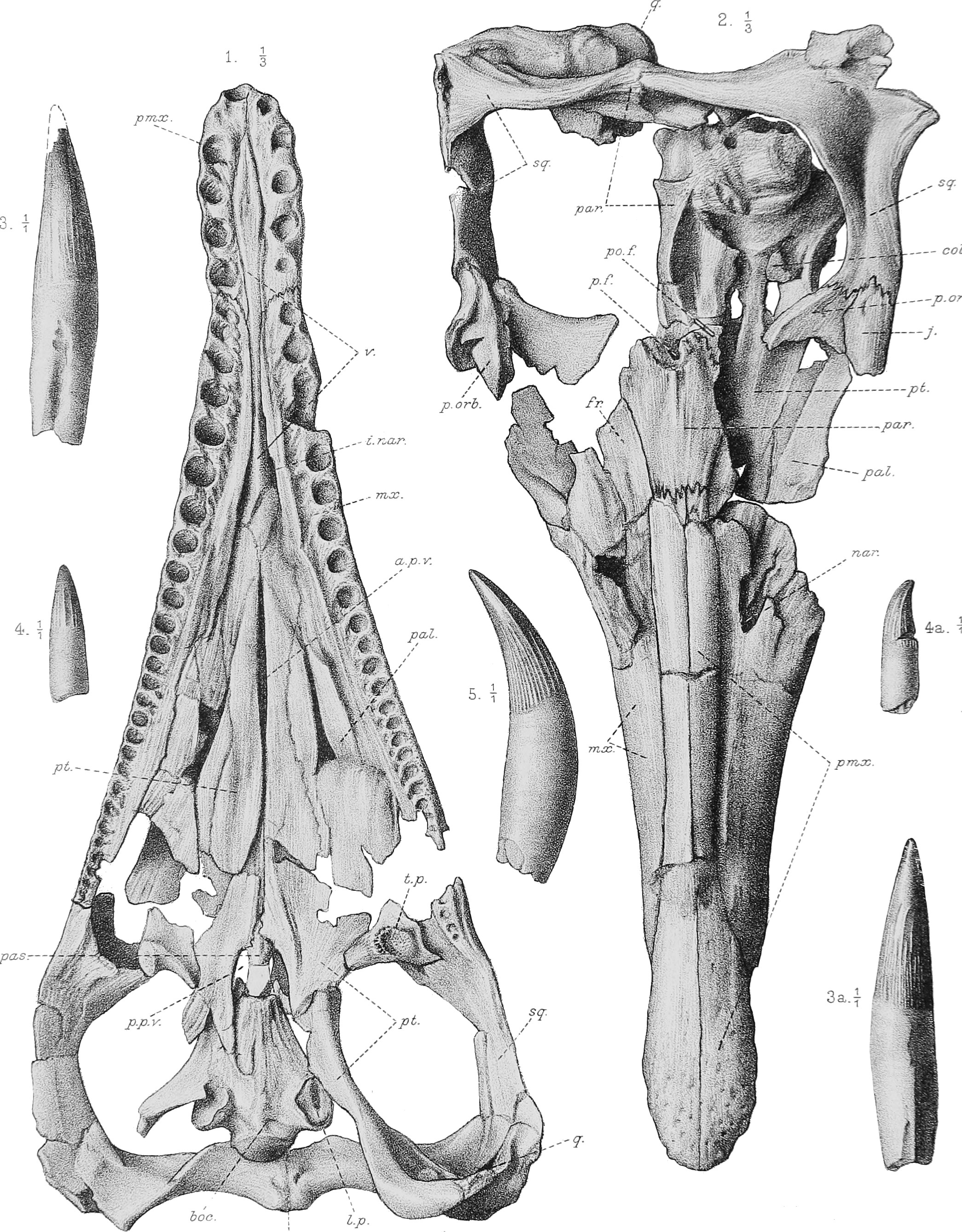
Cranium of Peloneustes figured from below (left, NHMUK 3803) and above (right, NHMUK 2679)

Characteristically, the premaxillae (front upper tooth-bearing bones) of Peloneustes bear six teeth each, and the diastemata (gaps between teeth) of the upper jaw are narrow. While it has been stated that Peloneustes had nasals (bones bordering the external nares), well-preserved specimens indicate that this is not the case. The frontals (bones bordering the eye sockets) of Peloneustes contact both the eye sockets and the external nares, a distinctive trait of Peloneustes. There has been some contention as to whether or not Peloneustes had lacrimals (bones bordering the lower front edges of the eye sockets), due to poor preservation. However, well preserved specimens indicate that the lacrimals are distinct bones as in other pliosaurids, as opposed to extensions of the jugals (bones bordering the lower rear edges of the eye sockets). The palate of Peloneustes is flat and bears many openings, including the internal nares (the opening of the nasal passage into the mouth). These openings are contacted by palatal bones known as palatines, a configuration used to identify this genus. The parasphenoid (a bone that forms the lower front part of the braincase) bears a long cultriform process (a frontwards projection of the braincase) that is visible when the palate is viewed from below, another distinctive characteristic of Peloneustes. The occiput (rear part of the cranium) of Peloneustes is open, bearing large fenestrae.

Peloneustes is known from many mandibles, some of which are well-preserved. The longest of these measures 87.7 centimetres (2.88 ft). The mandibular symphysis is elongated, making up about a third of the total mandibular length. Behind the symphysis, the two sides of the mandible diverge before gently curving back inwards near the hind end. Each dentary (the tooth-bearing bone in the mandible) has between 36 and 44 teeth, 13 to 15 of which are located on the symphysis. The second to seventh tooth sockets (tooth sockets) are larger than those located further back, and the symphysis is the widest around the fifth and sixth. In addition to the characteristics of its mandibular teeth, Peloneustes can also be identified by its coronoids (upper inner mandibular bones), which contribute to the mandibular symphysis. Between the tooth rows, the mandibular symphysis bears an elevated ridge where the dentaries meet. This is a unique feature of Peloneustes, not seen in any other plesiosaurs. The mandibular glenoid (socket of the jaw joint) is broad, kidney-shaped, and angled upwards and inwards.

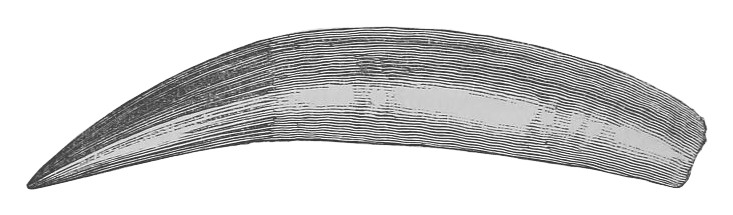
Tooth

The teeth of Peloneustes have circular cross sections, as seen in other pliosaurids of its age. The teeth have the shape of recurved cones. The enamel of the crowns bears regularly-spaced vertical ridges of varying length on all sides. These ridges are more concentrated on the concave edge of the teeth. Most of the ridges extend to one half to two-thirds of the total crown height, with few actually reaching the tooth's apex. The dentition of Peloneustes is heterodont, that is, it has teeth of different shapes. The larger teeth are caniniform and located at the front of the jaws, while the smaller teeth are more sharply recurved, stouter, and located further back.

=== Postcranial skeleton ===
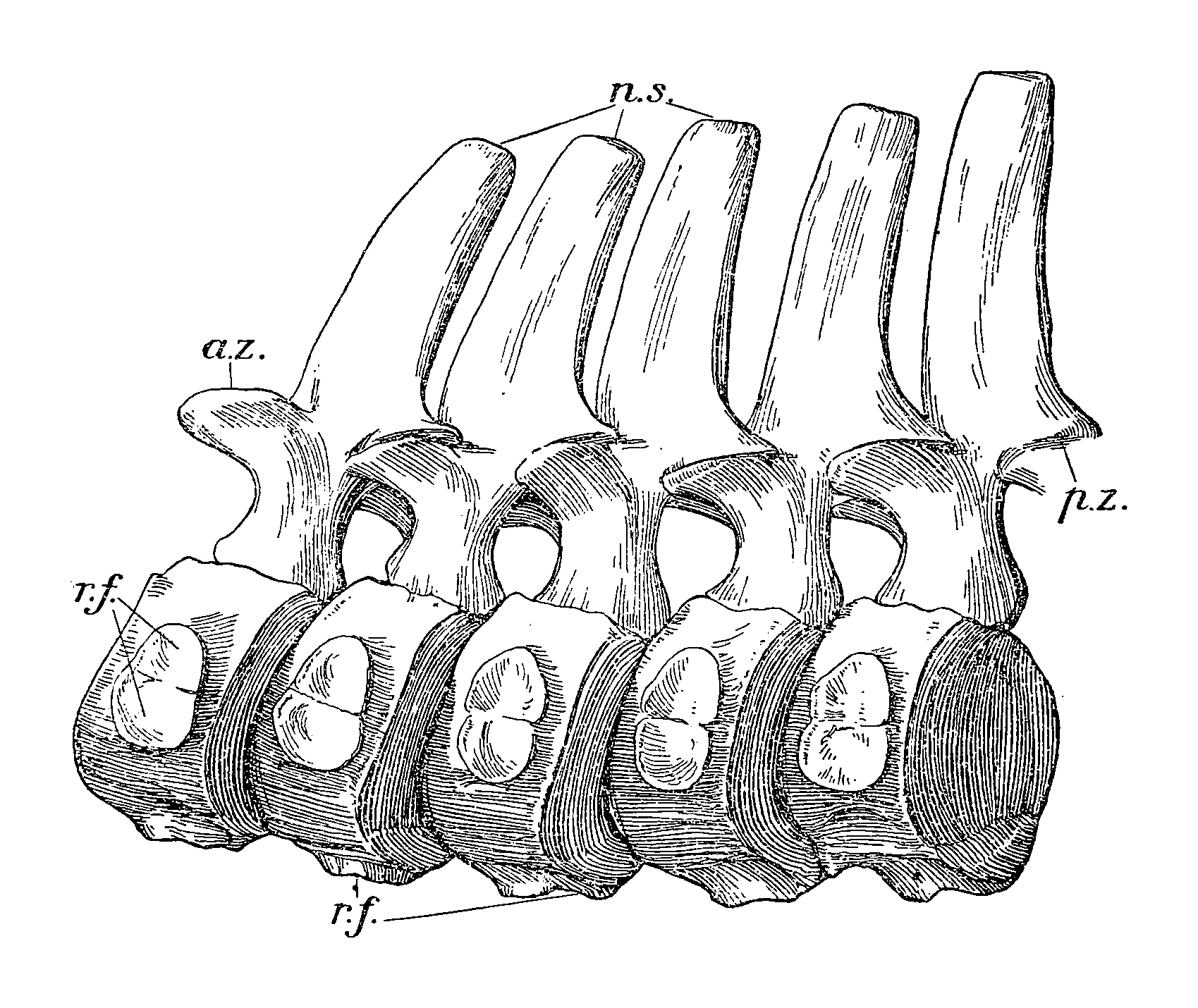
Middle cervical vertebrae (NHMUK R3318)

In 1913, Andrews reported that Peloneustes had 21 to 22 cervical, 2 to 3 pectoral, and around 20 dorsal vertebrae, with the exact number of sacral (hip) and caudal vertebrae unknown, based on specimens in the Leeds Collection. However, in the same year, Linder reported 19 cervical, 5 pectoral, 20 dorsal, 2 sacral, and at least 17 caudal vertebrae in Peloneustes, based on a specimen in the Institut für Geowissenschaften, University of Tübingen. The first two cervical vertebrae, the atlas and axis, are fused in adults, but in juveniles they are present as several unfused elements. The intercentrum (part of the vertebral body) of the axis is roughly rectangular, extending beneath the centrum (vertebral body) of the atlas. The cervical vertebrae bear tall neural spines that are compressed from side to side. The cervical centra are about half as long as wide. They bear strongly concave articular surfaces, with a prominent rim around the lower edge in the vertebrae located towards the front of the series. Each cervical centrum has a strong keel along the midline of its underside. Most of the cervical ribs bear two heads that are separated by a notch.

The pectoral vertebrae bear articulations for their respective ribs partially on both their centra and neural arches. Following these vertebrae are the dorsal vertebrae, which are more elongated than the cervical vertebrae and have shorter neural spines. The sacral and caudal vertebrae both have less elongated centra that are wider than tall. Many of the ribs from the hip and the base of the tail bear enlarged outer ends that seem to articulate with each other. Andrews hypothesised in 1913 that this configuration would have stiffened the tail, possibly to support the large hind limbs. The terminal (last) caudal vertebrae sharply decrease in size and would have supported proportionately larger chevrons than the caudal vertebrae located further forwards. In 1913, Andrews speculated that this morphology may have been present to support a small tail fin-like structure. Other plesiosaurs have also been hypothesised to have tail fins, with impressions of such a structure possibly known in one species.

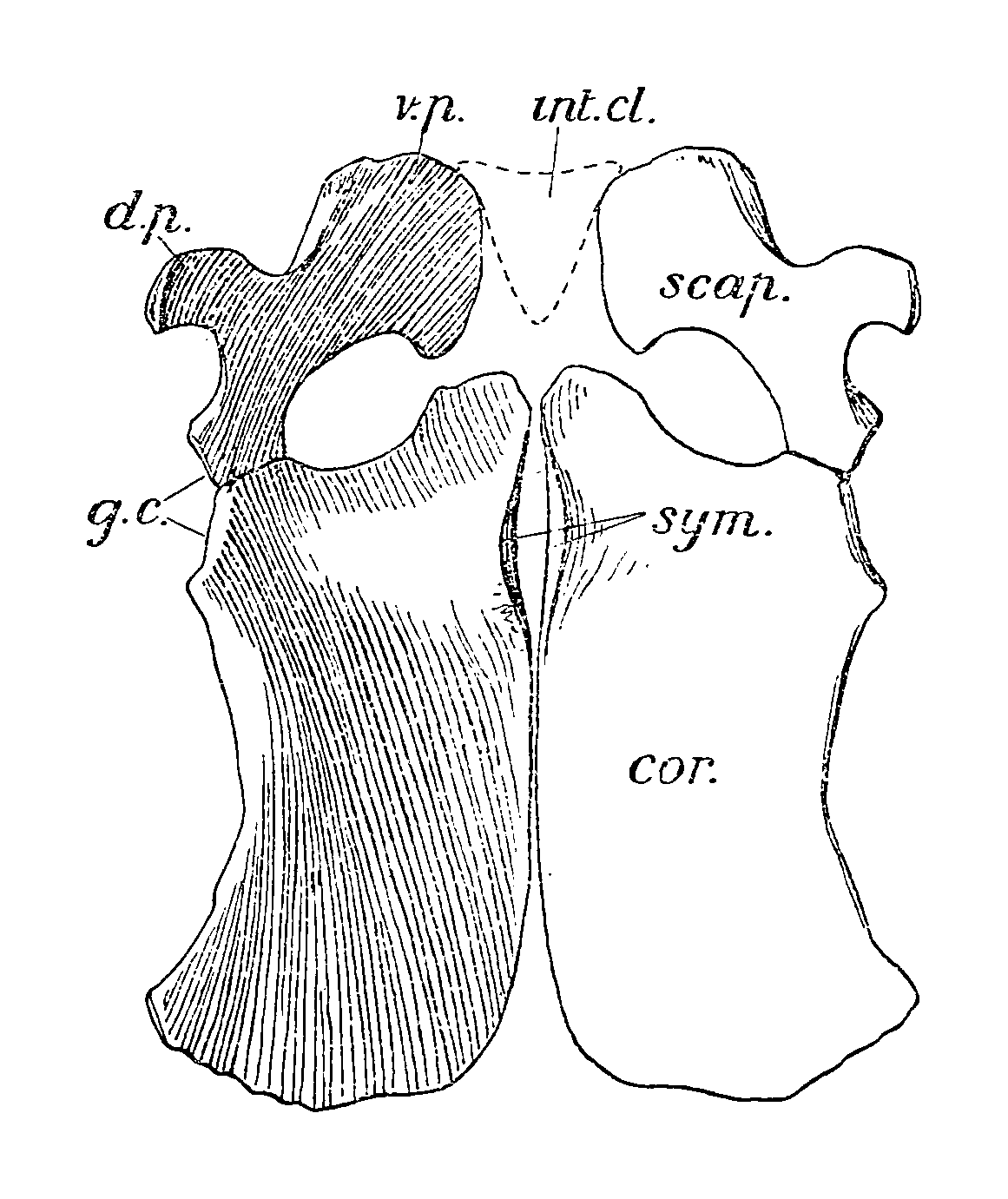
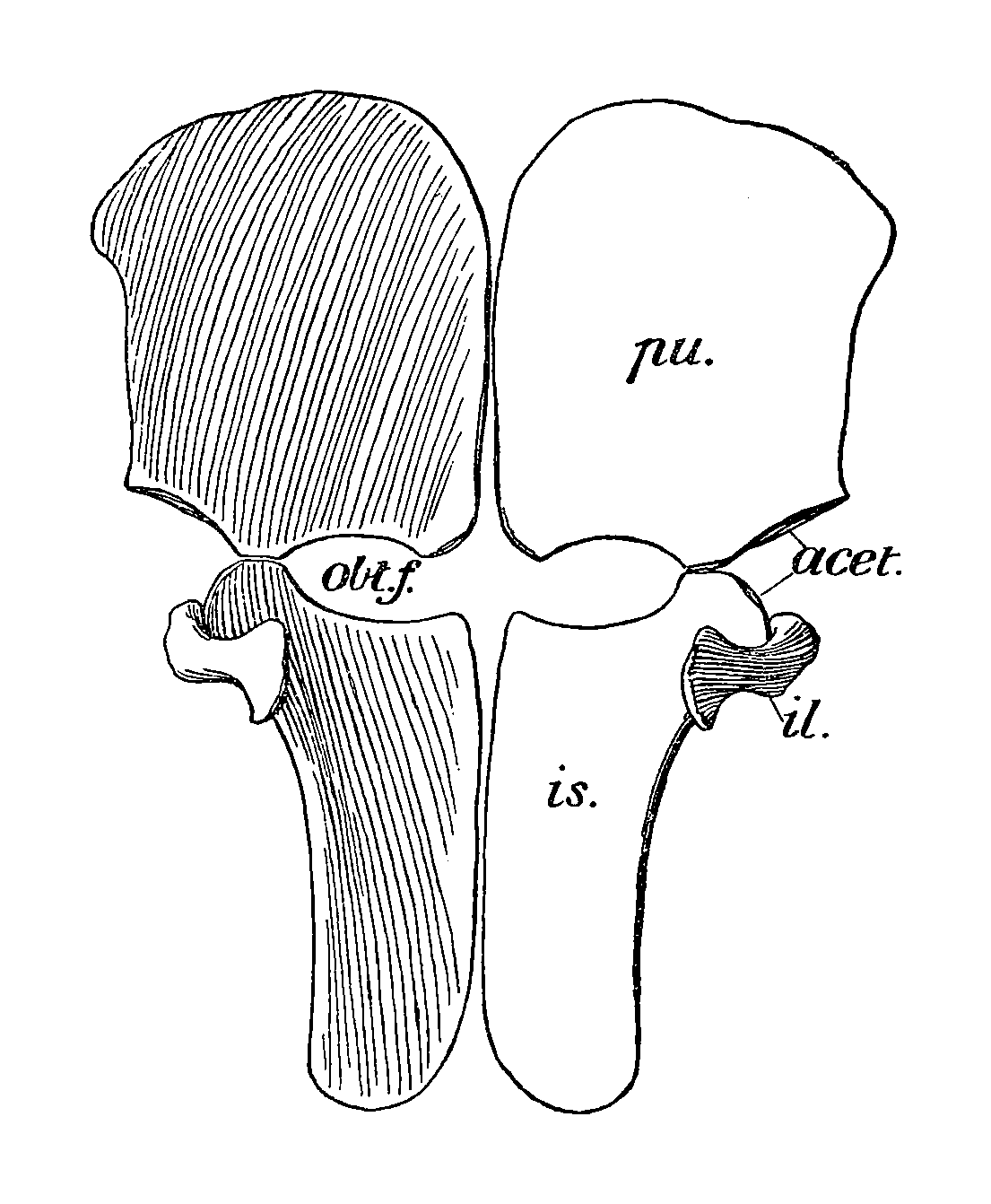
Shoulder (left) and pelvic (right) girdles of NHMUK R3318

The shoulder girdle of Peloneustes was large, although not as heavily built as in some other plesiosaurs. The coracoids are the largest bones in the shoulder girdle, and are plate-like in form. The shoulder joint is formed by both the scapula (shoulder balde) and the coracoid, with the two bones forming a 70° angle with each other. The scapulae are typical in form for a pliosaurid and triradiate, bearing three prominent projections, or rami. The dorsal (upper) ramus is directed outwards, upwards, and backwards. The underside of each scapula bears a ridge directed towards the front edge of its ventral (lower) ramus. The ventral rami of the two scapulae were separated from each other by a triangular bone known as the interclavicle. As seen in other pliosaurs, the pelvis of Peloneustes bears large and flat ischia and pubic bones. The third pelvic bone, the ilium, is smaller and elongated, articulating with the ischium. The upper end of the ilium shows a large amount of variation within P. philarchus, with two forms known, one with a rounded upper edge, the other with a flat upper edge and more angular shape.

The hind limbs of Peloneustes are longer than its forelimbs, with the femur being longer than the humerus, although the humerus is the more robust of the two elements. The radius (one of the lower forelimb bones) is approximately as wide as it is long, unlike the ulna (the other lower forelimb bone), which is wider than long. The radius is the larger of these two elements. The tibia is larger than the fibula (lower hindlimb bones) and longer than wide, while the fibula is wider than long in some specimens. The metacarpals, metatarsals, and the proximal manual phalanges (some of the bones making up the outer part of the paddle) are flattened. Most of the phalanges in both limbs have rounded cross-sections, and all of them have prominent constrictions in their middles. The number of phalanges in each digit is unknown in both the fore- and hind limbs.

== Classification ==
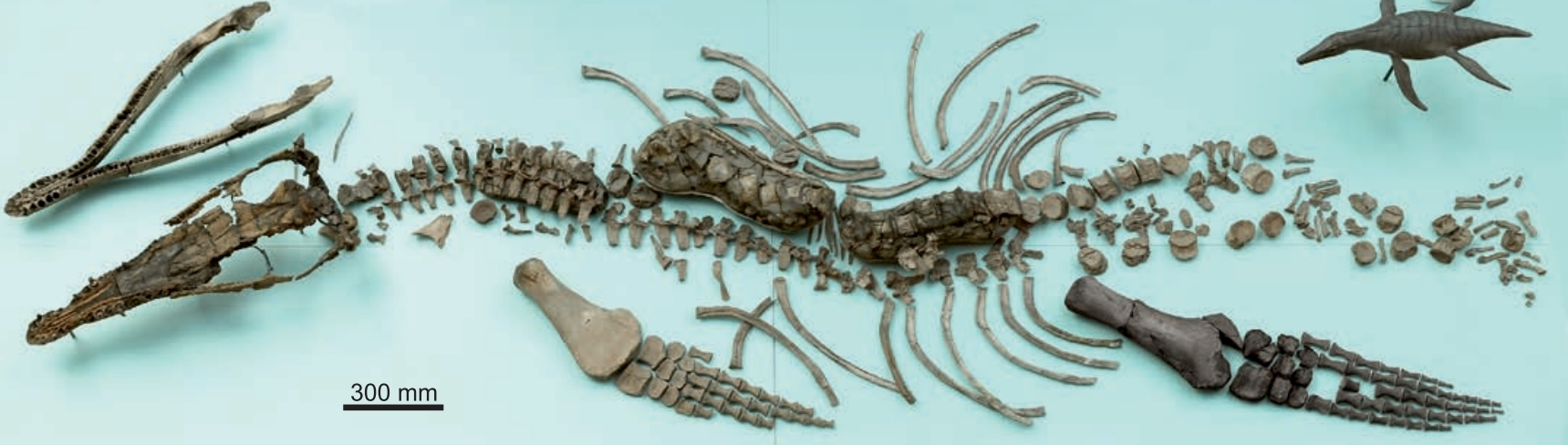
Skeleton of Eardasaurus, another pliosaurid from the Oxford Clay, at the Oxford University Museum of Natural History

Seeley initially described Peloneustes as a species of Plesiosaurus, a rather common practice (at the time, the scope of genera was similar to what is currently used for families). In 1874, Seeley named a new family of plesiosaurs, Pliosauridae, to contain forms similar to Pliosaurus. In 1890, Lydekker placed Peloneustes in this family, to which it has been consistently assigned since. Exactly how pliosaurids are related to other plesiosaurs is uncertain. In 1940, palaeontologist Theodore E. White considered pliosaurids to be close relatives of Elasmosauridae based on shoulder anatomy. However, in 1943, palaeontologist Samuel P. Welles thought that pliosaurids were more similar to Polycotylidae, as they both had large skulls and short necks, among other characteristics. He grouped these two families into the superfamily Pliosauroidea, with other plesiosaurs forming the superfamily Plesiosauroidea. Another plesiosaur family, Rhomaleosauridae, has since been assigned to Pliosauroidea, while Polycotylidae has been reassigned to Plesiosauroidea. However, in 2012, Benson and colleagues recovered a different topology, with Pliosauridae being more closely related to Plesiosauroidea than Rhomaleosauridae. This pliosaurid-plesiosauroid clade was termed Neoplesiosauria.

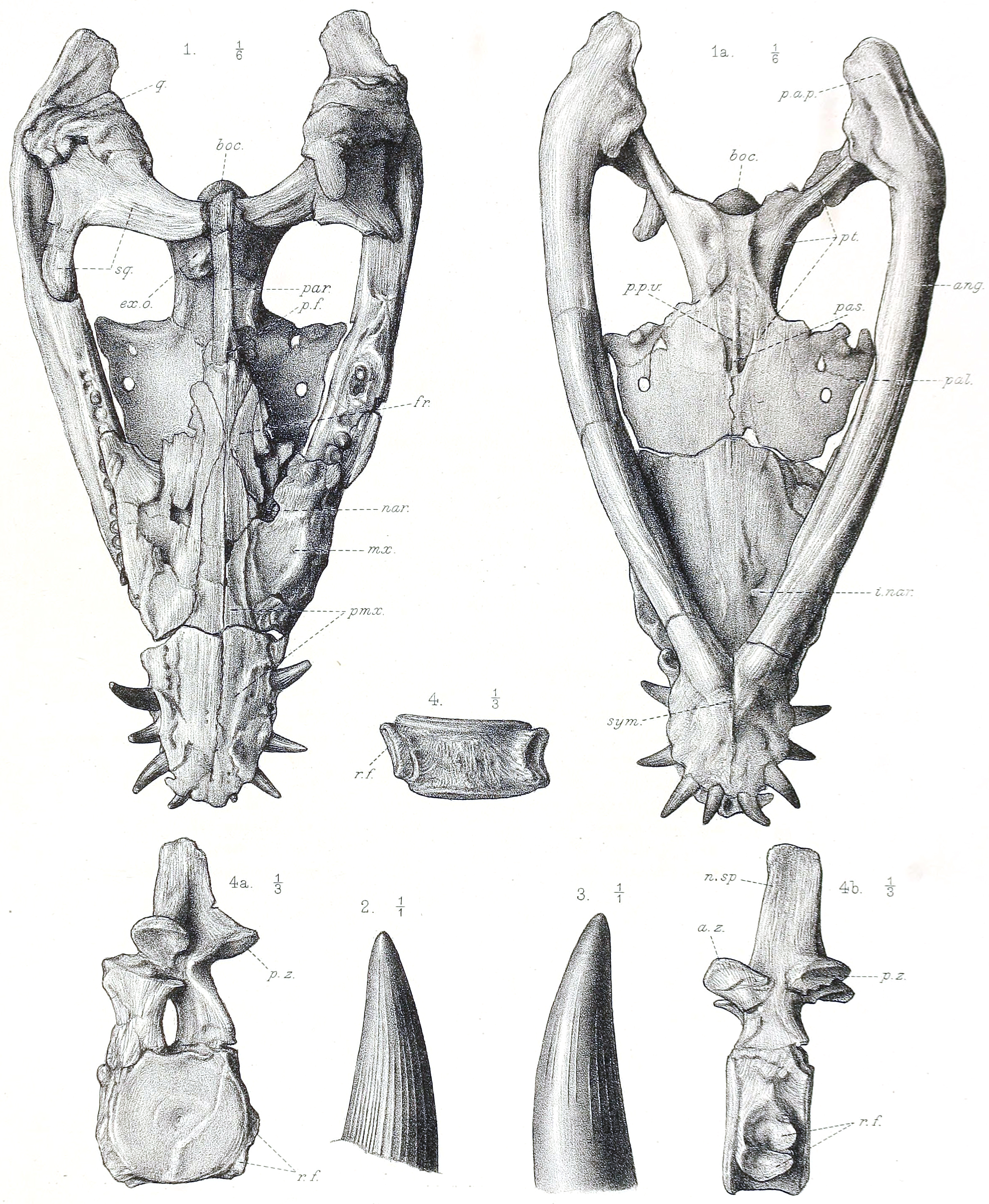
Skull, teeth, and vertebrae of Simolestes, a pliosaurid also from the Oxford Clay

Within Pliosauridae, the exact phylogenetic position of Peloneustes is uncertain. In 1889, Lydekker considered Peloneustes to represent a transitional form between Pliosaurus and earlier plesiosaurs, although he found it unlikely that Peloneustes was ancestral to Pliosaurus. In 1960, Tarlo considered Peloneustes to be a close relative of Pliosaurus, since both taxa had elongated mandibular symphyses. In 2001, O'Keefe recovered it as a basal (early-diverging) member of this family, outside of a group including Liopleurodon, Pliosaurus, and Brachauchenius. However, in 2008, palaeontologists Adam S. Smith and Gareth J. Dyke found Peloneustes to be the sister taxon of Pliosaurus. In 2013, Benson and palaeontologist Patrick S. Druckenmiller named a new clade within Pliosauridae, Thalassophonea. This clade included the "classic", short-necked pliosaurids while excluding the earlier, long-necked, more gracile forms. Peloneustes was found to be the most basal thalassophonean. Subsequent studies have uncovered a similar position for Peloneustes.

The following cladogram follows Ketchum and Benson, 2022.

- - Marmornectes candrewi
  - - Thalassophonea
      - Peloneustes philarchus
      - - Eardasaurus powelli
        - - "Pliosaurus" andrewsi
          - - Simolestes vorax
            - - Liopleurodon ferox
              - - Pliosaurus spp.
                - Brachaucheninae

== Paleobiology ==
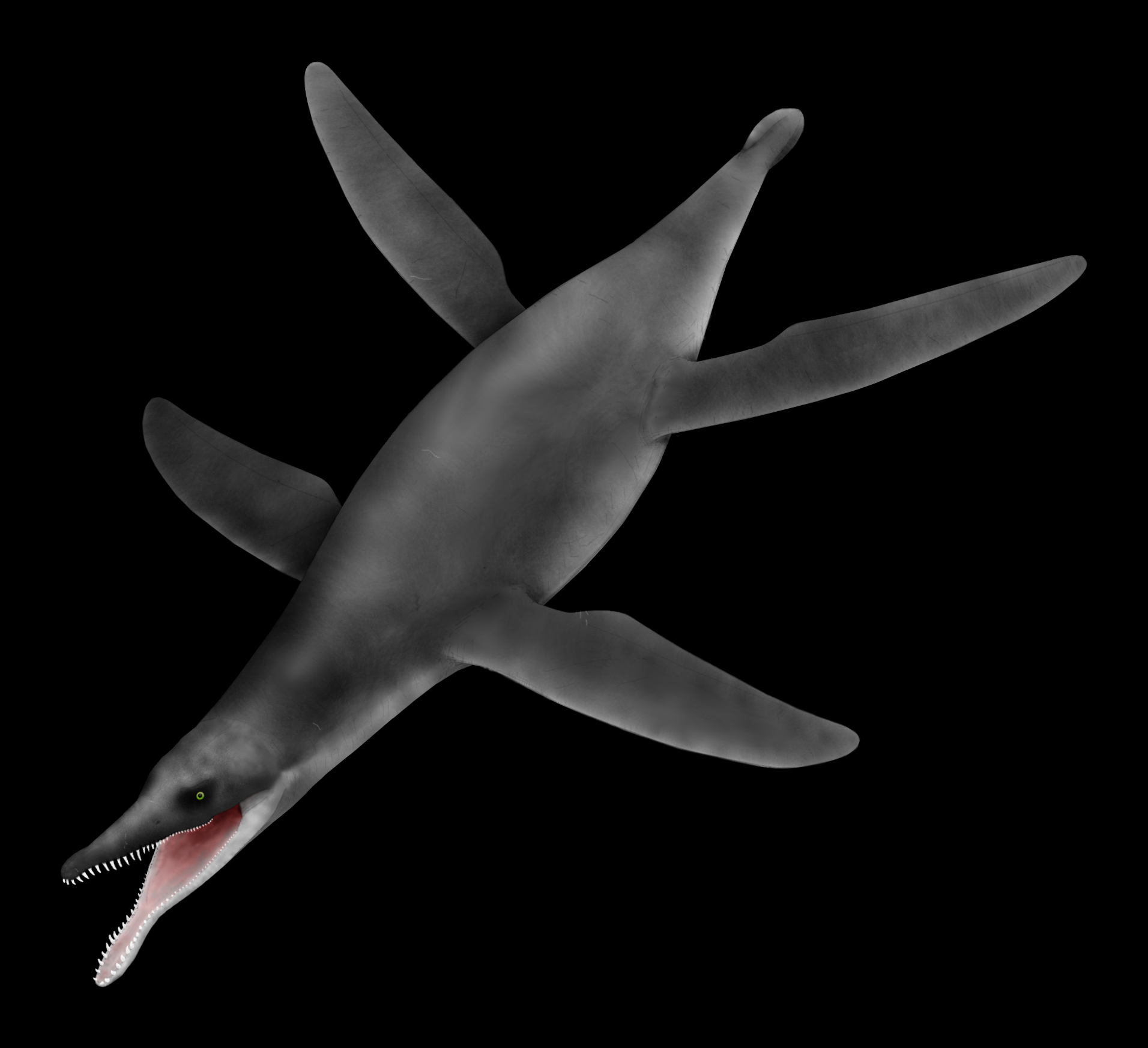
Life restoration

Plesiosaurs were well-adapted to marine life. They grew at rates comparable to those of birds and had high metabolisms, indicating homeothermy or even endothermy. The bony labyrinth, a hollow within the skull which held a sensory organ associated with balance and orientation, of Peloneustes and other plesiosaurs is similar in shape to that of sea turtles. Palaeontologist James Neenan and colleagues hypothesised in 2017 that this shape probably evolved alongside the flapping motions used by plesiosaurs to swim. Peloneustes and other short-necked plesiosaurs also had smaller labyrinths than plesiosaurs with longer necks, a pattern also seen in cetaceans. Additionally, Peloneustes probably had salt glands in its head to cope with excess amount of salt within its body. However, Peloneustes appears to have been a predator of vertebrates, which contain less salt than invertebrates, therefore leading palaeontologist Leslie Noè to suggest in a 2001 dissertation that these glands would not have had to be especially large. Peloneustes, like many other pliosaurs, displayed a reduced level of ossification of its bones. Palaeontologist Arthur Cruickshank and colleagues in 1996 proposed that this may have helped Peloneustes maintain its buoyancy or improved its manoeuvrability. A 2019 study by palaeontologist Corinna Fleischle and colleagues found that plesiosaurs had enlarged red blood cells, based on the morphology of their vascular canals, which would have aided them while diving.

Plesiosaurs such as Peloneustes employed a method of swimming known as subaqueous flight, using their flippers as hydrofoils. Plesiosaurs are unusual among marine reptiles in that they used all four of their limbs, but not movements of the vertebral column, for propulsion. The short tail, while unlikely to have been used to propel the animal, could have helped stabilise or steer the plesiosaur. The front flippers of Peloneustes have aspect ratios of 6.36, while the rear flippers have aspect ratios of 8.32. These ratios are similar to those of the wings of modern falcons. In 2001, O'Keefe proposed that, much like falcons, pliosauromorph plesiosaurs such as Peloneustes probably were capable of moving quickly and nimbly, albeit inefficiently, to capture prey. Computer modelling by palaeontologist Susana Gutarra and colleagues in 2022 found that due to their large flippers, a plesiosaur would have produced more drag than a comparably-sized cetacean or ichthyosaur. However, plesiosaurs counteracted this with their large trunks and body size. Due to the reduction in drag by their shorter, deeper bodies, palaeontologist Judy Massare proposed in 1988 that plesiosaurs could actively search for and pursue their food instead of having to lie in wait for it.

=== Feeding mechanics ===
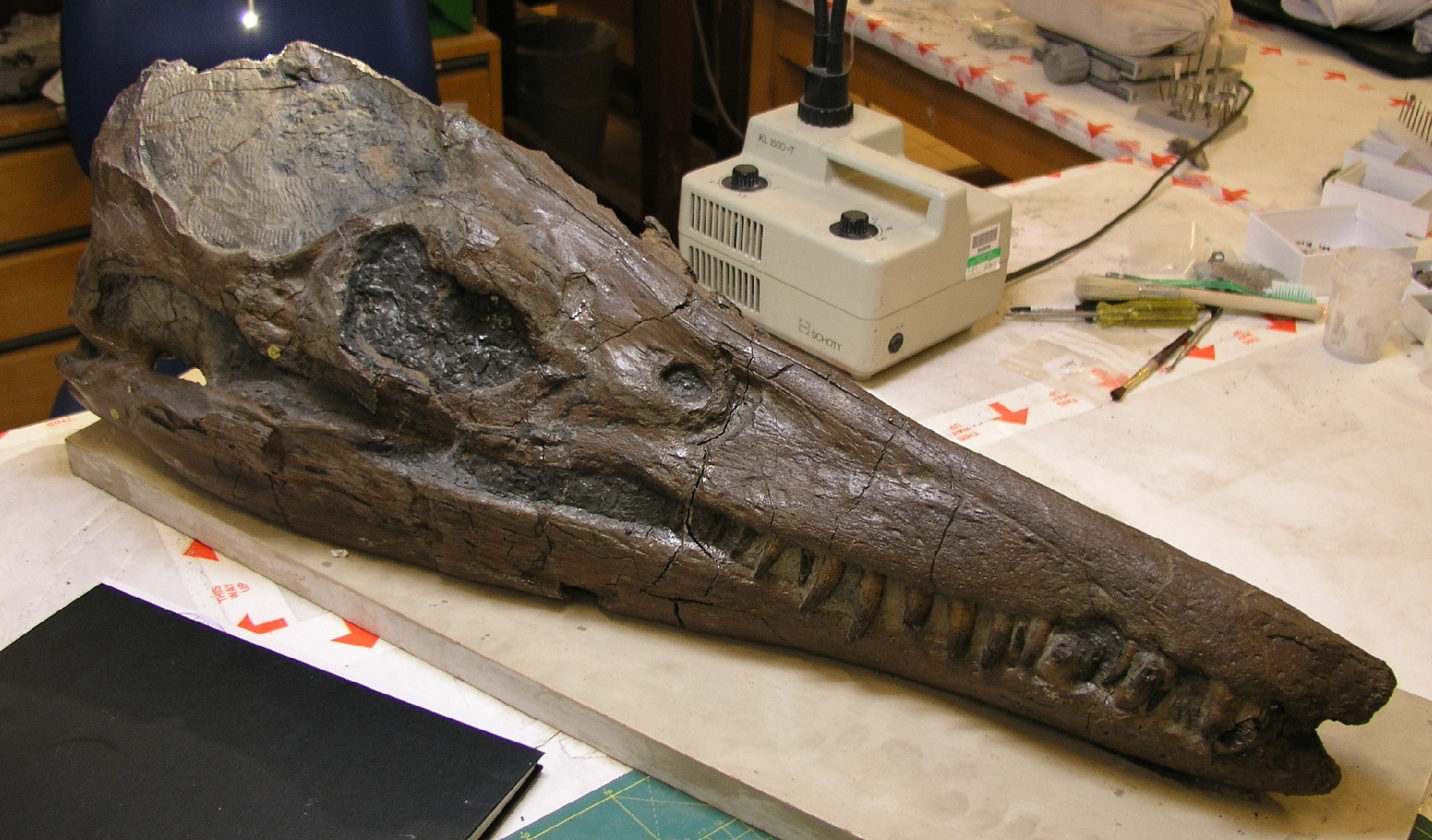
Three dimensionally preserved skull NHMUK R4058

In a 2001 dissertation, Noè noted many adaptations in pliosaurid skulls for predation. To avoid damage while feeding, the skulls of pliosaurids like Peloneustes are highly akinetic, where the bones of the cranium and mandible were largely locked in place to prevent movement. The snout contains elongated bones that helped to prevent bending and bears a reinforced junction with the facial region to better resist the stresses of feeding. When viewed from the side, little tapering is visible in the mandible, strengthening it. The mandibular symphysis would have helped deliver an even bite and prevent the mandibles from moving independently. The enlarged coronoid eminence provides a large, strong region for the anchorage of the jaw muscles, although this structure is not as large in Peloneustes as it is in other contemporary pliosaurids. The regions where the jaw muscles were anchored are located further back on the skull to avoid interference with feeding. The kidney-shaped mandibular glenoid would have made the jaw joint steadier and stopped the mandible from dislocating. Pliosaurid teeth are firmly rooted and interlocking, which strengthens the edges of the jaws. This configuration also works well with the simple rotational movements that pliosaurid jaws were limited to and strengthens the teeth against the struggles of prey. The larger front teeth would have been used to impale prey while the smaller rear teeth crushed and guided the prey backwards toward the throat. With their wide gapes, pliosaurids would not have processed their food very much before swallowing.

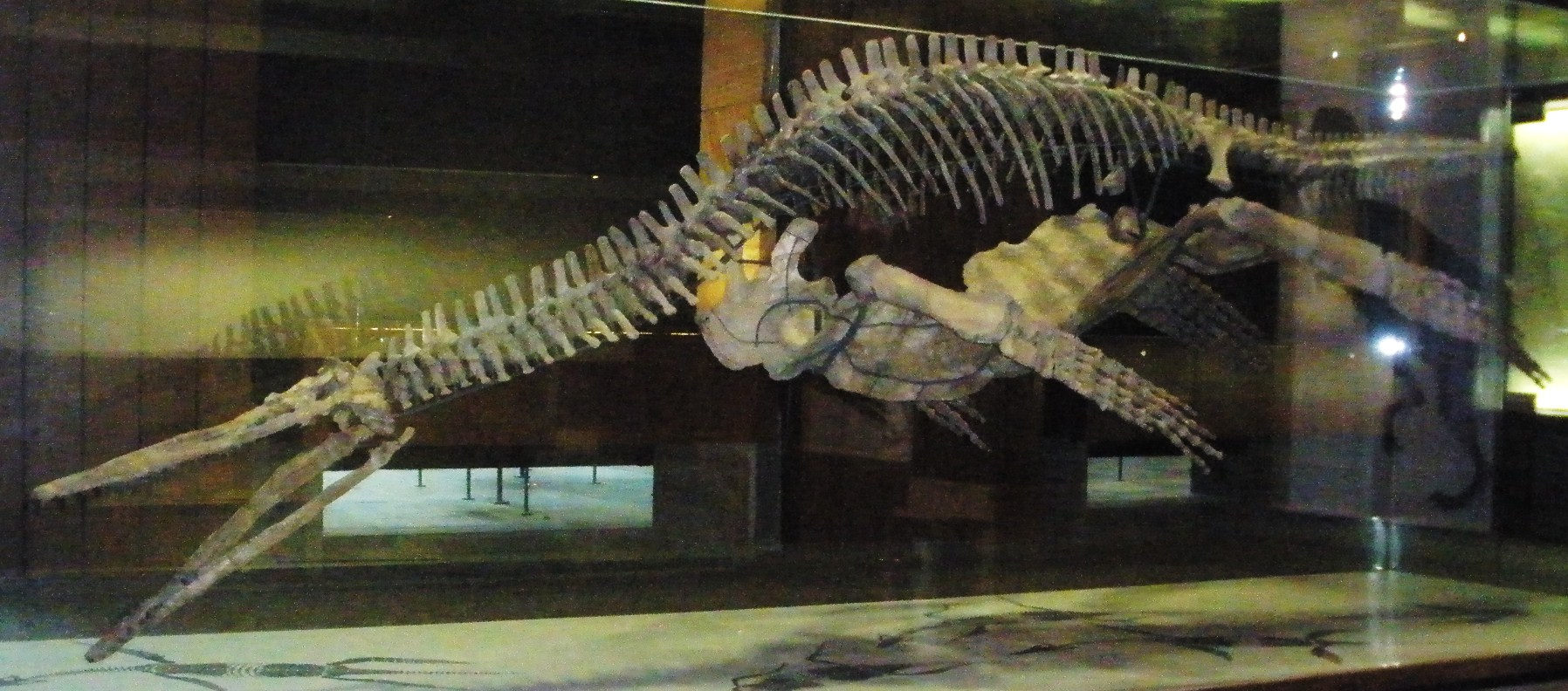
Mounted skeleton in Naturmuseum Senckenberg, Frankfurt

The numerous teeth of Peloneustes rarely are broken, but often show signs of wear at their tips. Their sharp points, slightly curved, gracile shape, and prominent spacing indicate that they were built for piercing. The slender, elongated snout is similar in shape to that of a dolphin. Both the snout and tooth morphologies led Noè to suggest that Peloneustes was a piscivore (fish eater). To catch its prey, Peloneustes would have quickly swung its head to the side. The gracile snout's roughly circular cross-section would have minimized drag, while the long jaws were suited for quickly snapping up mobile prey. The flat, enlarged palate and reinforced braincase of Peloneustes would have reduced the torsion, flexing, and shearing caused by the long snout. The reinforced braincase would have reduced the shock absorption in the area of the brain. Since the tip of the snout was further away from the jaw joint, it would have exerted a weaker bite force than the regions further back. The front regions of the jaws of Peloneustes are elongate, indicating that they would have been used to quickly strike at and apprehend prey. These adaptations indicate a preference for smaller prey that, while agile, would have been easier to incapacitate and less powerful. However, Peloneustes would still have been capable of attacking fish of moderate size. While a skeleton, catalogued as NHMUK R3317, with belemnite remains in its stomach was assigned to Peloneustes by Andrews in 1910, it is very incomplete and may actually belong to the contemporaneous pliosaurid Simolestes instead, as suggested by Noè. Peloneustes has also been suggested to have inflicted bite marks upon a specimen of Cryptoclidus by Bruce Rothschild and colleagues in 2018.

== Palaeoenvironment ==
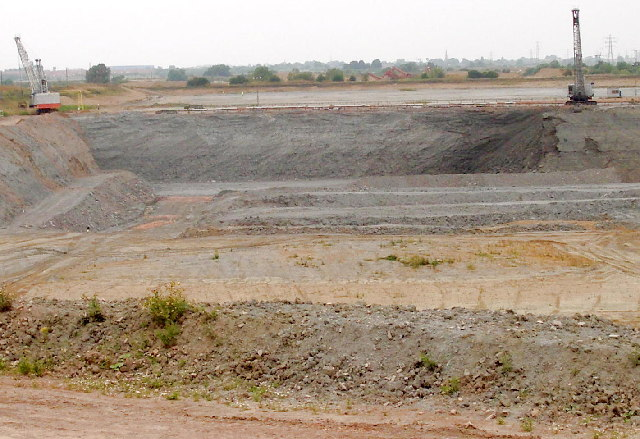
A clay pit in the Peterborough Member

Peloneustes is known from the Peterborough Member (formerly known as the Lower Oxford Clay) of the Oxford Clay Formation. While Peloneustes has been listed as coming from the Oxfordian stage (spanning from about 162 to 155 million years ago) of the Upper Jurassic, the Peterborough Member actually dates to the Callovian stage (spanning from about 165 to 162 million years ago) of the Middle Jurassic. The Peterborough Member spans from the late lower Callovian to the early upper Callovian, occupying the entirety of the Middle Callovian. It overlays the Kellaways Formation and is overlain by the Stewartby Member of the Oxford Clay Formation. The Peterborough Member is primarily composed of grey bituminous (asphalt-containing) shale and clay rich in organic matter. These rocks are sometimes fissile (splittable into thin, flat slabs). The member is about 16–25 metres (52–82 ft) thick, stretching from Dorset to the Humber.

The Peterborough Member represents an epicontinental sea during a time of rising sea levels. When it was deposited, it would have been located at a latitude of 35°N. This sea, known as the Oxford Clay sea, was largely encircled by islands and continents, which provided the seaway with sediment. Its proximity to land is demonstrated by the preservation of terrestrial fossils such as driftwood in the Oxford Clay, in addition to a clastic dike in the lower levels of the Peterborough Member, with the dike's formation being facilitated by rainwater. The southern region of the Oxford Clay Sea was connected to the Tethys Ocean, while it was connected to more boreal regions on its northern side. This allowed for faunal interchange to occur between the Tethyan and boreal regions. This sea was approximately 30–50 metres (100–160 ft) deep within 150 kilometres (93 mi) of the shoreline.

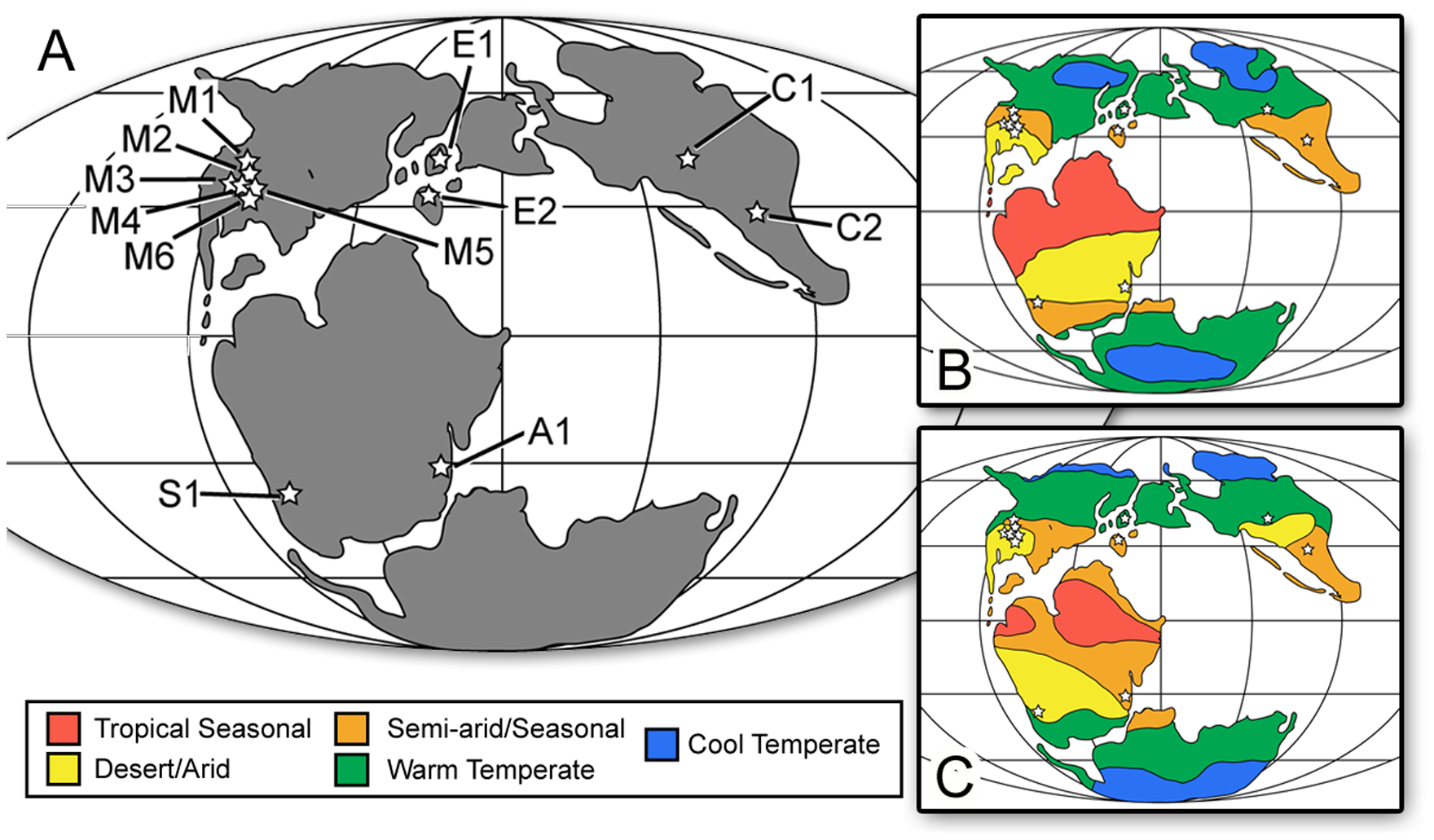
Map of the world in the Jurassic, the Oxford Clay Formation is located at E1

The surrounding land would have had a Mediterranean climate, with dry summers and wet winters, though it was becoming increasingly arid. Based on information from δ^{18}O isotopes in bivalves, the water temperature of the seabed of the Peterborough Member varied from 14–17 °C (57–63 °F) due to seasonal variation, with an average temperature of 15 °C (59 °F). Belemnite fossils provide similar results, giving a water temperature range with a minimum 11 °C (52 °F) to a maximum between 14 °C (57 °F) or 16 °C (61 °F), with an average temperature of 13 °C (55 °F). While traces of green sulphur bacteria indicate euxinic water, with low oxygen and high hydrogen sulfide levels, abundant traces of benthic (bottom-dwelling) organisms suggest that the bottom waters were not anoxic. Oxygen levels appear to have varied, with some deposits laid down in more aerated conditions than others.

=== Contemporaneous biota ===
There are many kinds of invertebrates preserved in the Peterborough Member. Among these are cephalopods, which include ammonites, belemnites, and nautiloids. Bivalves are another abundant group, while gastropods and annelids are less so but still quite common. Arthropods are also present. Brachiopods and echinoderms are rare. Despite not being known from fossils, polychaetes probably would have been present in this ecosystem, due to their abundance in similar modern environments and burrows similar to ones produced by these worms. Microfossils pertaining to foraminiferans, coccolithophoroids, and dinoflagellates are abundant in the Peterborough Member.

A wide variety of fish are known from the Peterborough Member. These include the chondrichthyans Asteracanthus, Brachymylus, Heterodontus (or Paracestracion), Hybodus, Ischyodus, Palaeobrachaelurus, Pachymylus, Protospinax, Leptacanthus, Notidanus, Orectoloboides, Spathobathis, and Sphenodus. Actinopterygians were also present, represented by Aspidorhynchus, Asthenocormus, Caturus, Coccolepis, Heterostrophus, Hypsocormus, Leedsichthys, Lepidotes, Leptolepis, Mesturus, Osteorachis, Pachycormus, Pholidophorus, and Sauropsis. These fish include surface-dwelling, midwater, and benthic varieties of various sizes, some of which could get quite large. They filled a variety of niches, including invertebrate eaters, piscivores, and, in the case of Leedsichthys, giant filter feeders.

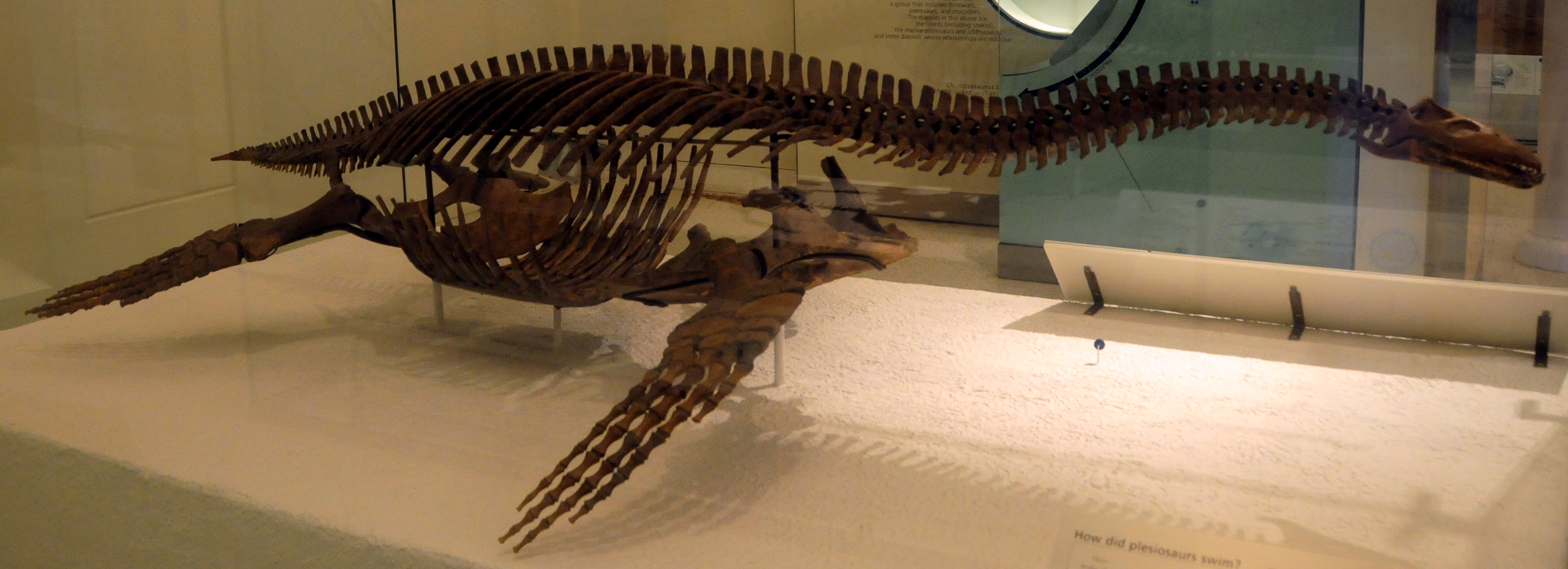
Mounted skeleton of Cryptoclidus, a plesiosaur from the Peterborough Member, at the American Museum of Natural History

Plesiosaurs are common in the Peterborough Member, and besides pliosaurids, are represented by cryptoclidids, including Cryptoclidus, Muraenosaurus, Tricleidus, and Picrocleidus. They were smaller plesiosaurs with thin teeth and long necks, and, unlike pliosaurids such as Peloneustes, would have mainly eaten small animals. The ichthyosaur Ophthalmosaurus also inhabited the Oxford Clay Formation. Ophthalmosaurus was well adapted for deep diving, thanks to its streamlined, porpoise-like body and gigantic eyes, and probably fed on cephalopods. Many genera of crocodylomorphs are also known from the Peterborough Member. These include the gavial-like teleosauroids Charitomenosuchus, Lemmysuchus, Mycterosuchus, and Neosteneosaurus and the mosasaur-like metriorhynchids Gracilineustes, Suchodus, Thalattosuchus, and Tyrannoneustes. While uncommon, the small piscivorous pterosaur Rhamphorhynchus was also part of this marine ecosystem.

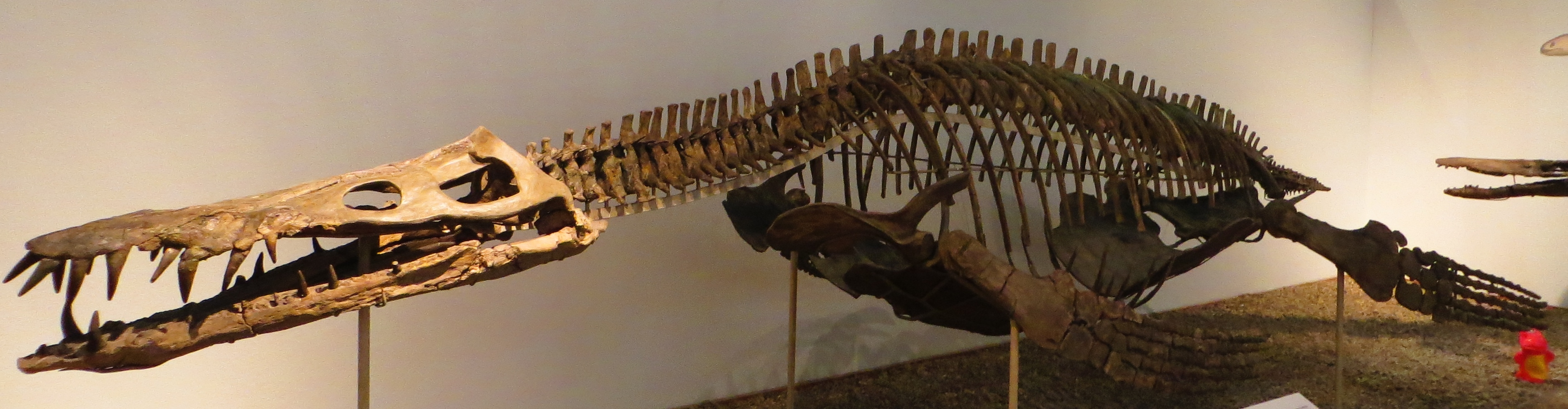
Skeletal mount of Liopleurodon ferox at the University of Tübingen, another pliosaurid from the Peterborough Member

More pliosaurid species are known from the Peterborough Member than any other assemblage. Besides Peloneustes, these pliosaurids include Liopleurodon ferox, Simolestes vorax, "Pliosaurus" andrewsi, Marmornectes candrewi, Eardasaurus powelli, and, potentially, Pachycostasaurus dawni. However, there is considerable variation in the anatomy of these species, indicating that they fed on different prey, thereby avoiding competition (niche partitioning). The large, powerful pliosaurid Liopleurodon ferox appears to have been adapted to take on large prey, including other marine reptiles and large fish. The long-snouted Eardasaurus powelli like Liopleurodon also has teeth with cutting edges and may have also taken large prey. Simolestes vorax, with its wide, deep skull and powerful bite, appears to have been a predator of large cephalopods. "Pliosaurus" andrewsi, like Peloneustes, possesses an elongated snout, an adaptation for feeding upon small, agile animals. However, its teeth are suited for cutting, indicating a preference for larger prey, while those of Peloneustes are better adapted for piercing. "Pliosaurus" andrewsi is also larger than Peloneustes. Marmornectes candrewi is also similar to Peloneustes, bearing a long snout, and perhaps also fed on fish. Pachycostasaurus dawni is a small, heavily built pliosaur that probably fed on benthic prey. It has a weaker skull than other pliosaurids and was more stable, so it probably used different feeding methods to avoid competition. Unlike the other pliosaurids of the Oxford Clay, Pachycostasaurus was rather rare, perhaps mainly living outside of the depositional area of the Oxford Clay Formation, possibly inhabiting coastal regions, deep water, or even rivers instead. While several different types of pliosaurids were present in the Middle Jurassic, the long-snouted piscovorous forms such as Peloneustes died out at the Middle-Upper Jurassic boundary. This seems to have been the first phase of a gradual decline in plesiosaur diversity. While the cause of this is uncertain, it may have been influenced by changing ocean chemistry, and, in later phases, falling sea levels.

== See also ==
- List of plesiosaur genera
- Timeline of plesiosaur research
