= Protochimaera =

Protochimaera Temporal range: mid-Viséan (Tulian) to lower-mid-Serpukhovian (Steshevian)

Scientific classification
- Kingdom: Animalia
- Phylum: Chordata
- Class: Chondrichthyes
- Subclass: Holocephali
- Order: Chimaeriformes
- Suborder: †Protochimaeroidei; Lebedev & Popov in Lebedev et al., 2021
- Family: †Protochimaeridae; Lebedev & Popov in Lebedev et al., 2021
- Genus: †Protochimaera; Lebedev & Popov in Lebedev et al., 2021
- Species: †P. mirabilis

Binomial name
- †Protochimaera mirabilis Lebedev & Popov in Lebedev et al., 2021

Extinct genus of cartilaginous fishes

Protochimaera is an extinct genus of chimaeriform fish from the Mississippian (Early Carboniferous) of central Russia. It is the oldest known representative of the order Chimaeriformes, approximately 10 million years older than Echinochimaera (from the late Serpukhovian of Montana), and far older than the Mesozoic radiation which would lead to modern chimaeriforms, commonly known as chimaeras, rat fish, or ghost sharks.

Protochimaera is known from tooth plates found at five sites southwest of the Moscow Basin. These sites correspond to the Olkhovets Formation (Tulian and Aleksinian regional stages, equivalent to the middle of the global Viséan stage) and Dashkovo Formation (Steshevian regional stage, the lower-middle part of the Serpukhovian). Like modern chimaeras (Chimaeroidei), there are three pairs of tooth plates, each developing a cutting or shearing edge. This degree of similarity suggests that Protochimaera is the sister taxon to Chimaeroidei, a proposal supported by a phylogenetic analysis. This position is more derived than Echinochimaera or even some Mesozoic taxa such as Squaloraja and Myriacanthoids.
