= Bathytheristes =

Bathytheristes Temporal range: Toarcian

Scientific classification
- Kingdom: Animalia
- Phylum: Chordata
- Class: Chondrichthyes
- Subclass: Holocephali
- Order: Chimaeriformes
- Family: Callorhinchidae
- Genus: †Bathytheristes; Duffin, 1995

Extinct Chimaera genus from the Jurassic

Bathytheristes is an extinct genus of chimaera from the late Early Jurassic epoch of the Jurassic Period. Its name roughly translates to "Reaper of the deep." It is known from a single species, B. gracilis. It was discovered in the early Toarcian-aged Posidonia Shale Formation of Ohmden, Germany. The specific epithet refers to the slender of the tooth plate in this species. It is related to the modern elephantfish.
