= Ptyktoptychion =

Ptyktoptychion Temporal range: Early Cretaceous

Scientific classification
- Kingdom: Animalia
- Phylum: Chordata
- Class: Chondrichthyes
- Subclass: Holocephali
- Order: Chimaeriformes
- Family: Callorhinchidae
- Genus: †Ptyktoptychion; Lees, 1986

Species
- Ptyktoptychion tayyo Lees, 1986; Ptyktoptychion wadeae Bartholomai, 2008

Extinct genus of cartilaginous fishes

Ptyktoptychion is an extinct genus of chimaeras known from the Early Cretaceous of Australia.
