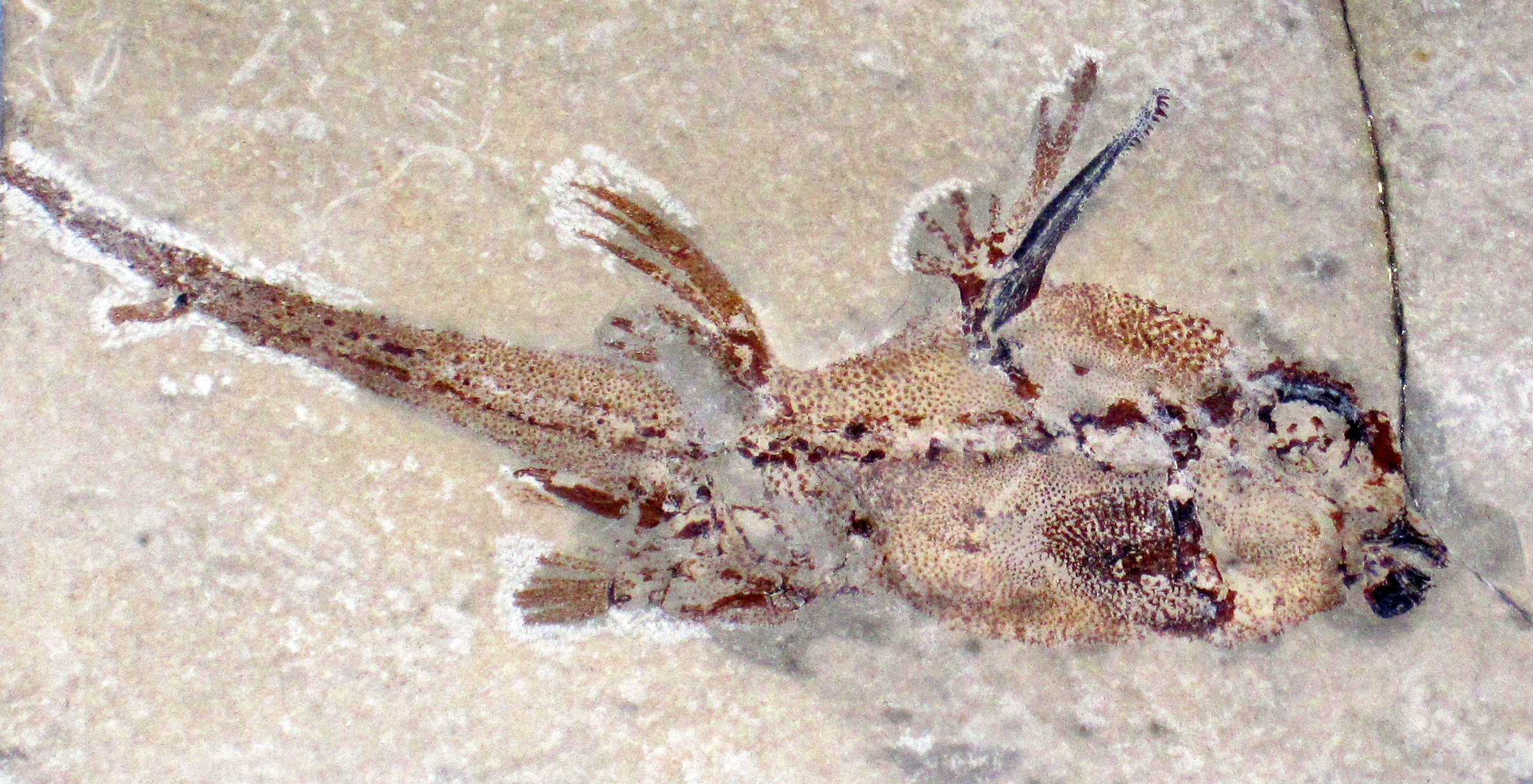
- Specimen of Echinochimaera meltoni

Scientific classification
- Kingdom: Animalia
- Phylum: Chordata
- Class: Chondrichthyes
- Subclass: Holocephali
- Order: Chimaeriformes
- Suborder: †Echinochimaeroidei
- Family: †Echinochimaeridae
- Genus: †Echinochimaera; Lund, 1977

Species
- †Echinochimaera meltoni; †Echinochimaera snyderi

= Echinochimaera =

Echinochimaera Temporal range: Serpukhovian, 318.1–328.3 Ma

Extinct genus of cartilaginous fishes

Echinochimaera ("prickly chimaera") is an extinct genus of chimaeriform fish, known from the Lower Carboniferous Bear Gulch Limestone in Montana, United States. It is one of the earliest Chimaeriformes known.

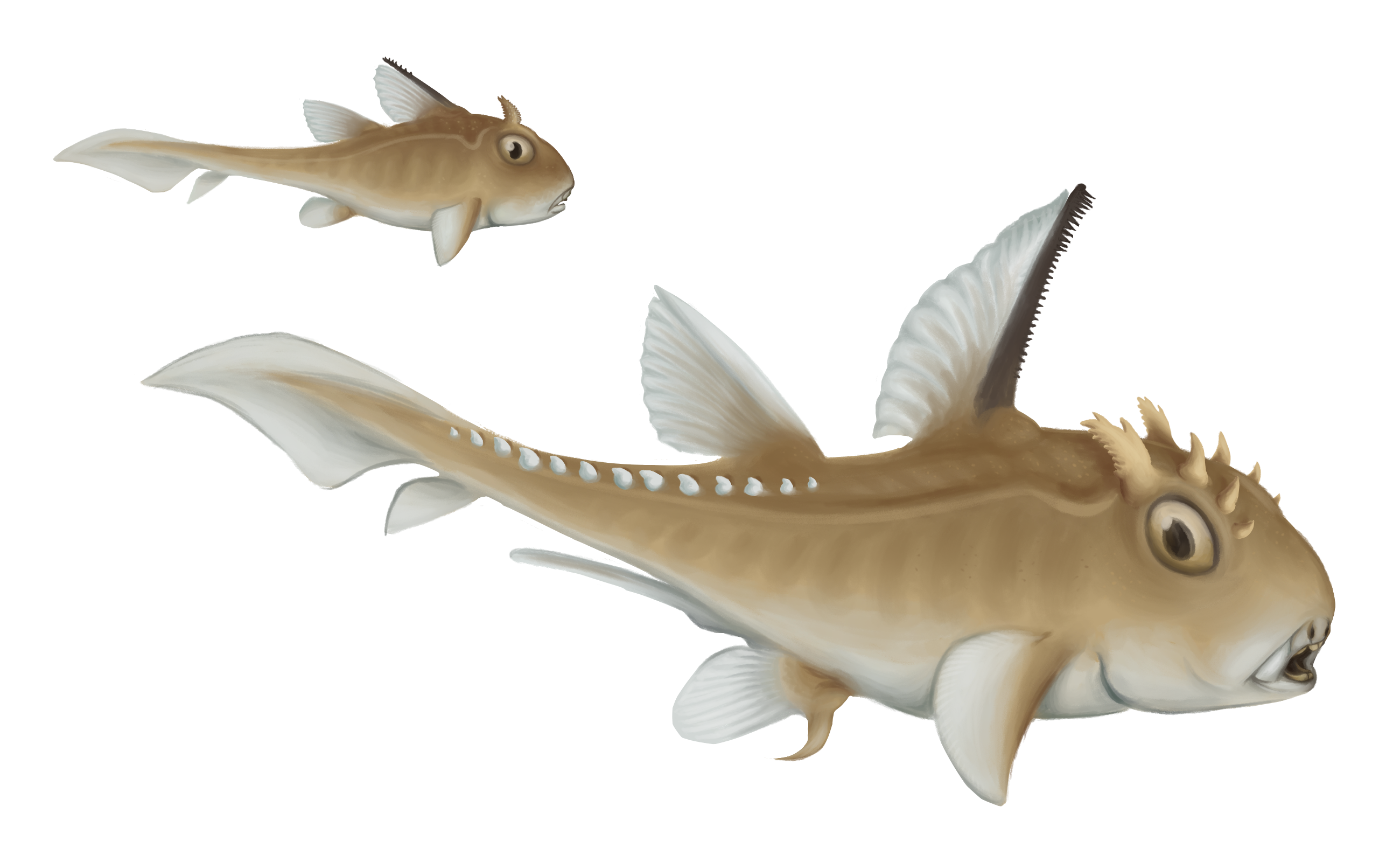
Life restorations of a pair of Echinochimaera meltoni including a female (top left) and a male (bottom right)

== Taxonomy ==
The genus' name derives from the Greek εχινό (echino) meaning spiny, and chimaera. It is assigned to the order Chimaeriformes.

=== Species ===
The two known Echinochimaera species lived in the Upper Mississippian (Serpukhovian). Fossils of the species were found in the Bear Gulch Limestone in Montana, United States.

Both species have rounded bodies and paddle-like tails as well as large pectoral fins, two dorsal fins and a jaw fused to the braincase. The paddle-like tails indicate that E. meltoni was likely not a predator nor a fast swimmer.

==== Echinochimaera meltoni ====
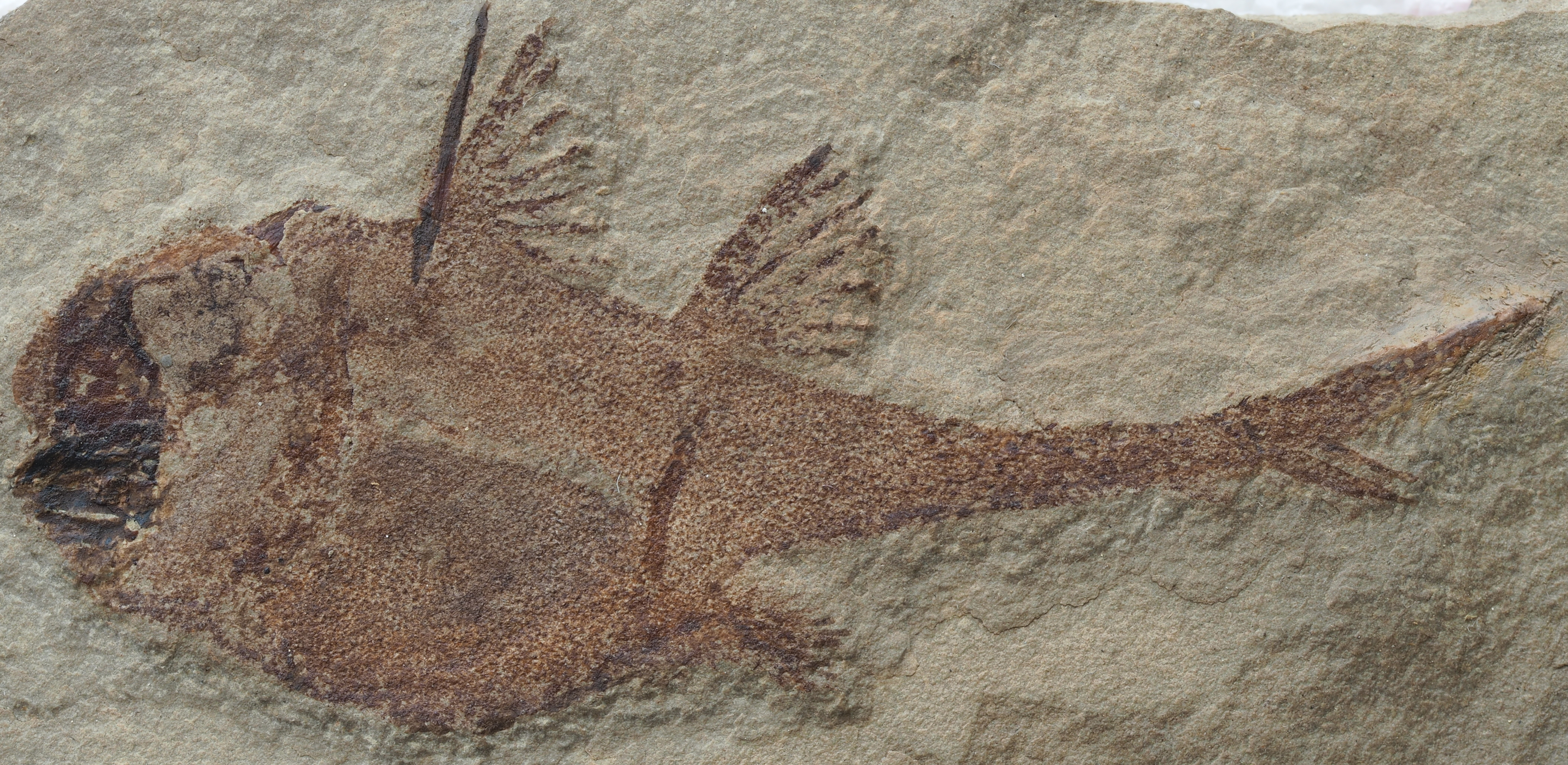
Specimen of E. meltoni

E. meltoni was first described by Richard Lund, an Adelphi University palaeontologist, in 1977. The fossils found of E. meltoni have shown a great deal of sexual dimorphism, with males being found to have a maximum body length of 15 cm (5.9 in) while that found in females was only 7 cm (2.8 in). Juveniles were 1.3–2 cm (0.51–0.79 in) long. In general, the females only grew to about half the size of the males. Males also had four pairs of spikes which may have been used to defend against predators and to identify the fish as male.

There was a relative abundance of immature male fossils found, and that together with the significant sexual dimorphism indicate there was extreme sexual selection among the species.

==== Echinochimaera snyderi ====
E. snyderi was described, like E. meltoni, by Richard Lund. It was described in 1988 based on juvenile specimens, all with a body length under 9 cm (3.5 in). E. snyderi differs from E. meltoni in fin detail as well as jaw shape and teeth near the front edge of the face rather than a tooth plate. Mature specimens discovered later suggest this species' adult size to be larger than E. meltoni.
