= Brachymylus =

Scientific classification
- Kingdom: Animalia
- Phylum: Chordata
- Class: Chondrichthyes
- Subclass: Holocephali
- Order: Chimaeriformes
- Family: Callorhinchidae
- Genus: †Brachymylus; Woodward, 1892

Species
- Brachymylus altidens; Brachymylus minor

Extinct genus of cartilaginous fishes

Brachymylus is an extinct genus of chimaera belonging to the family Callorhinchidae, which includes the modern-day plough-nose chimaeras.
