= Pachymylus =

Pachymylus Temporal range: Middle Jurassic

Scientific classification
- Kingdom: Animalia
- Phylum: Chordata
- Class: Chondrichthyes
- Subclass: Holocephali
- Order: Chimaeriformes
- Family: Callorhinchidae
- Genus: †Pachymylus; Woodward, 1892

Species
- Pachymylus leedsi

Extinct genus of cartilaginous fishes

Pachymylus is an extinct genus of chimaera belonging to the family Callorhinchidae. The type species. P. leedsi was described by A. S. Woodward in 1892, and is known from the Middle-Late Jurassic (Callovian-Oxfordian) Oxford Clay of Peterborough, England. The type material consisted of a large mandibular tooth and two palatine teeth. Indeterminate remains of the genus are also known from the Middle Jurassic (Bajocian) of France.
