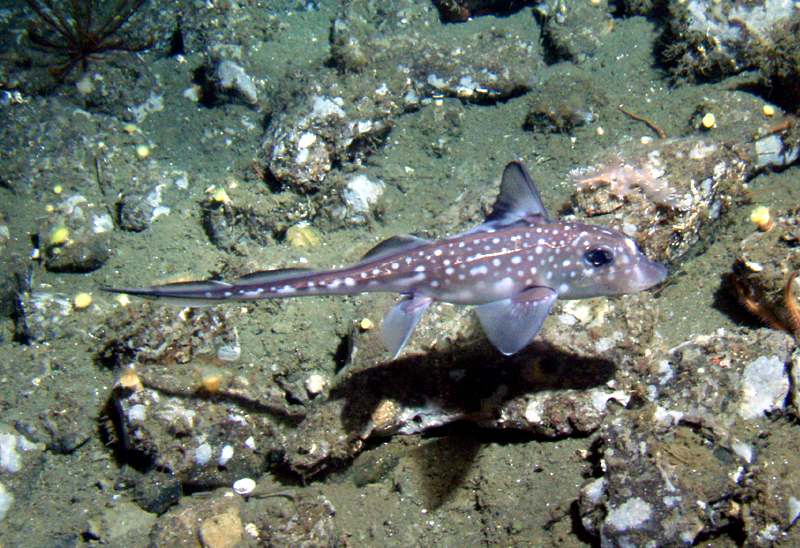
- Hydrolagus colliei (Chimaeridae)

Scientific classification
- Kingdom: Animalia
- Phylum: Chordata
- Class: Chondrichthyes
- Subclass: Holocephali
- Order: Chimaeriformes; Obruchev, 1953

Subgroups
- †Echinochimaera; †Protochimaera; †Squaloraja; †Myriacanthoidei; †Chimaeropsis; †Myriacanthidae; Chimaeroidei; Callorhinchidae; Chimaeridae; Rhinochimaeridae

= Chimaera =

Chimaeras Temporal range: Early Carboniferous–Present

Cartilaginous fish in the order Chimaeriformes

Chimaeras are cartilaginous fish in the order Chimaeriformes (/kɪˈmɛrɪfɔːrmiːz/), known informally as ghost sharks, rat fish (not to be confused with rattails), spookfish, or rabbit fish; the last two names are also applied, respectively, to the ray-finned fish groups of Opisthoproctidae and Siganidae.

At one time a "diverse and abundant" group (based on the fossil record), their closest living relatives are sharks and rays, though their last common ancestor with them lived nearly 400 million years ago. Living species (aside from plough-nose chimaeras) are largely confined to deep water.

== Anatomy ==
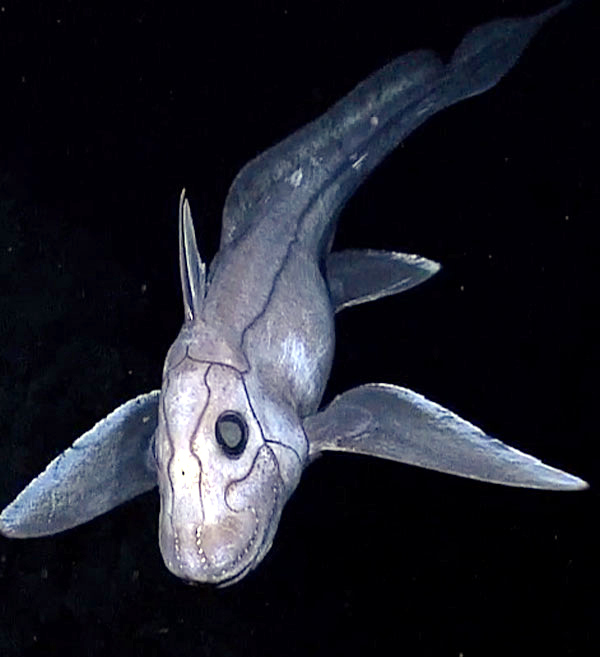
Deep-sea chimaera photographed by the NOAAS Okeanos Explorer. Visible on its snout are tiny pores which lead to electroreceptor cells.

Chimaeras are soft-bodied, shark-like fish with bulky heads and long, tapered tails; measured from the tail, they can grow up to 150 cm (4.9 ft) in length. Like other members of the class Chondrichthyes, chimaera skeletons are entirely cartilaginous, or composed of cartilage. Males use forehead denticles to grasp a female by a fin during copulation. The gill arches are condensed into a pouch-like bundle covered by a sheet of skin (an operculum), with a single gill-opening in front of the pectoral fins.

The pectoral fins are large enough to generate lift at a relaxed forward momentum, giving the chimaera the appearance of "flying" through the water. Further back on the body are also a pair of smaller pelvic fins, and some genera bear an anal fin in front of the tail. In chimaerids and rhinochimaerids, the tail is leptocercal, meaning that it is thin and whip-like, edged from above and below by fins of similar size. In callorhinchids, the tail is instead heterocercal, with a larger upper lobe inclined upwards, similar to many sharks. There are two dorsal fins: a large triangular first dorsal fin and a low rectangular or depressed second dorsal fin. For defense, some chimaeras have a venomous spine on the front edge of the dorsal fin.

In many species, the bulbous snout is modified into an elongated sensory organ, capable of electroreception to find prey. The cartilaginous skull is holostylic, meaning that the palatoquadrate (upper jaw cartilage) is completely fused to the neurocranium (cranial cartilage). This contrasts with modern sharks, where the palatoquadrate is movable and detachable, a trait known as hyostyly. The back of the head is supported by a complex of fused vertebrae called the synarcual, which also connects to the dorsal fin spine.

Instead of sharks' many sharp, consistently-replaced teeth, chimaeras have just six large, permanent tooth-plates, which grow continuously throughout their entire life. These tooth-plates are arranged in three pairs, with one pair at the tip of the lower jaws and two pairs along the upper jaws. They together form a protruding, beak-like crushing and grinding mechanism, comparable to the incisor teeth of rodents and lagomorphs (hence the name "rabbit fish"). Chimaera teeth are unique among vertebrates, due to their mode of mineralization. Most of each plate is formed by relatively soft osteodentin, but the active edges are supplemented by a unique hypermineralized tissue called pleromin. Pleromin is an extremely hard enamel-like tissue, arranged into sheets or beaded rods, but it is deposited by mesenchyme-derived cells similar to those that form bone. In addition, pleromin's hardness is due to the mineral whitlockite, which crystalizes within the teeth as the animal matures. Other vertebrates with hypermineralized teeth rely on enamel, which is derived from ameloblasts and encases round crystals of the mineral apatite.

Chimaeras also differ from sharks in that they have separate anal and urogenital openings.

== Behavior ==
Chimaeras live in temperate ocean floors, with some species inhabiting depths exceeding 2,000 m (6,600 ft), with relatively few modern species regularly inhabiting shallow water. Exceptions include the members of the genus Callorhinchus, the rabbit fish and the spotted ratfish, which locally or periodically can be found at shallower depths. Consequently, these are also among the few species kept in public aquaria. They live in all the oceans except for the Arctic and Antarctic oceans.

=== Diet ===
The usual diet of chimaeras consists of crustaceans, ophiuroids, and molluscs. Modern species are demersal durophages, but they used to be more diverse. The Carboniferous period had forms that lived as specialised suction feeders in the water column.

=== Reproduction ===
Chimaera reproduction resembles that of sharks in some ways: males employ claspers for internal fertilization of females and females lay eggs within spindle-shaped, leathery egg cases.

Unlike sharks, male chimaeras have retractable sexual appendages (known as tenacula) to assist mating. The frontal tenaculum, a bulbous rod which extends out of the forehead, is used to clutch the females' pectoral fins during mating. Both the facial appendage and its teeth are retractable. The prepelvic tenacula are serrated hooked plates normally hidden in pouches in front of the pelvic fins, and they anchor the male to the female. Lastly, the pelvic claspers (sexual organs shared by sharks) are fused together by a cartilaginous sheathe before splitting into a pair of flattened lobes at their tip.

=== Parasites ===
As other fish, chimaeras have a number of parasites. Chimaericola leptogaster (Chimaericolidae) is a monogenean parasite of the gills of Chimaera monstrosa; the species can attain 50 mm (2.0 in) in length.

== Conservation and threats ==
Despite their secluded habits, some chimaera species may be threatened by overfishing through bycatch or commercial exploitation. No species are listed as Endangered according to the IUCN, but four are listed as Vulnerable, four more as Near Threatened, and many more as Data Deficient (too rare to evaluate). Many species have restricted ranges and practically none have had their movement patterns studied. In addition, bycatch reports are usually insufficiently precise to the species or even genus level, so it is difficult to keep track of bycatch on a species-by-species basis. This lack of data renders chimaera species especially susceptible to overlooked population declines.

Several near-shore species are purposefully caught for their meat, especially callorhinchids, Hydrolagus bemisi (pale ghost shark), and Hydrolagus novaezealandiae (dark ghost shark). Modern quotas have helped to moderate collection of these species to a sustainable level, though Callorhinchus milii (the Australian ghostshark) experienced severe overfishing in the 20th century before protections were enacted. Neoharriotta pinnata (sicklefin chimaera) is targeted along the coast of India for its liver oil, and a recent decline of catch rates may indicate a population crash. Even species without commercial exploitation can fall victim to bycatch: Callorhinchus callorynchus (American elephantfish), Neoharriotta carri (dwarf sicklefin chimaera), Chimaera monstrosa (rabbit fish), Chimaera ogilbyi (Ogilby's ghostshark), Hydrolagus colliei (spotted ratfish), and Hydrolagus melanophasma (eastern Pacific black ghostshark) all have bycatch rates exceeding 10% in certain parts of their range, and some are experiencing steep declines. Chimaeras have mostly avoided harvesting for the fin trade, which threatens many true sharks.

Another threat is habitat destruction of coastal nurseries (by urban development) or deepwater reefs (by deep sea mining and trawling). Near-shore species such as Callorhinchus milii are vulnerable to the effects of climate change: stronger storms and warmer seawater are predicted to increase egg mortality by disrupting the stable environments necessary to complete incubation.

== Classification ==
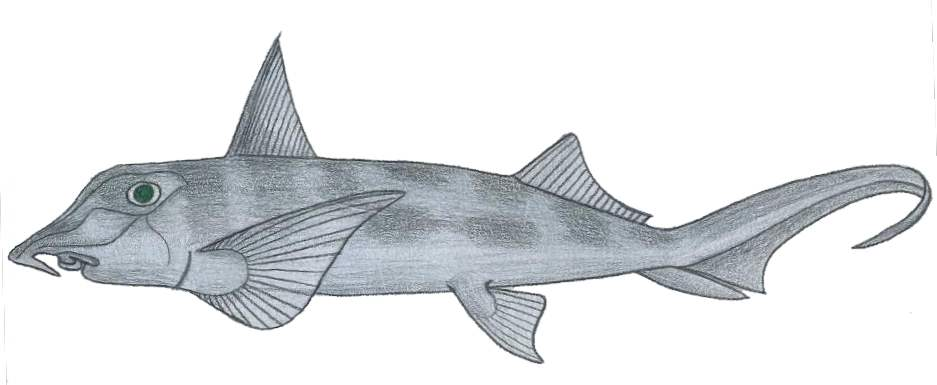
Callorhinchus callorynchus

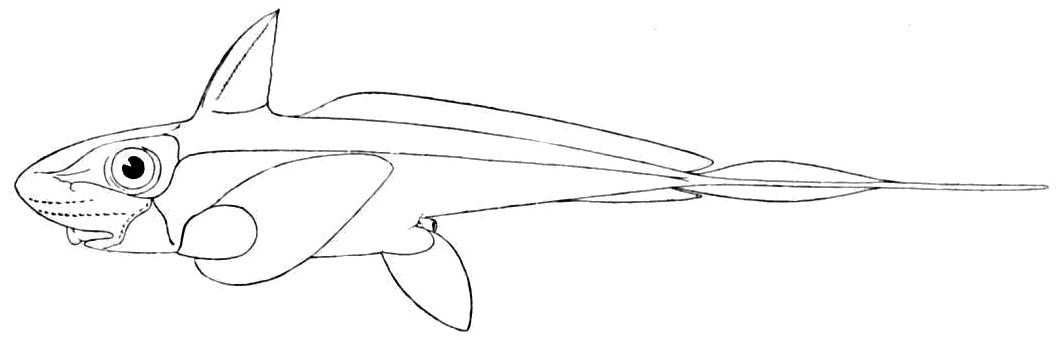
Chimaera monstrosa

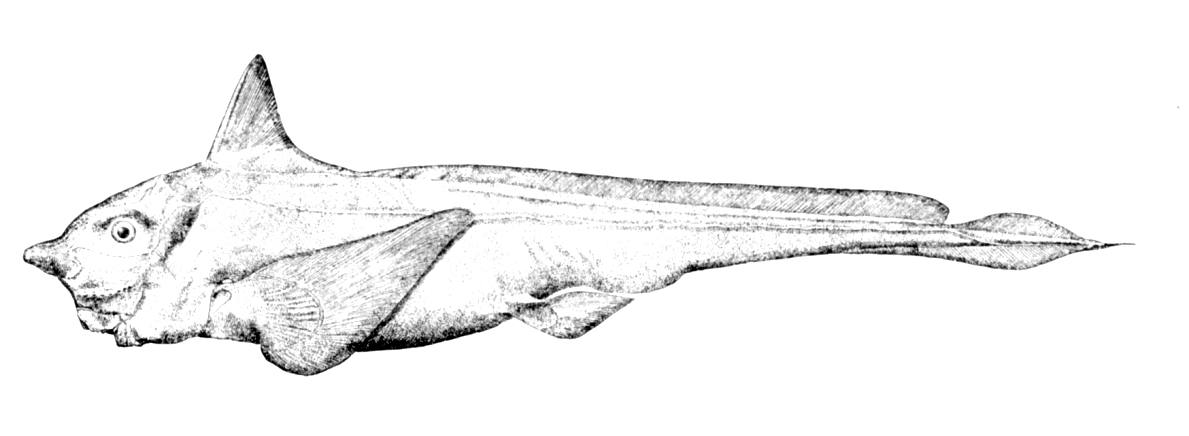
Hydrolagus affinis

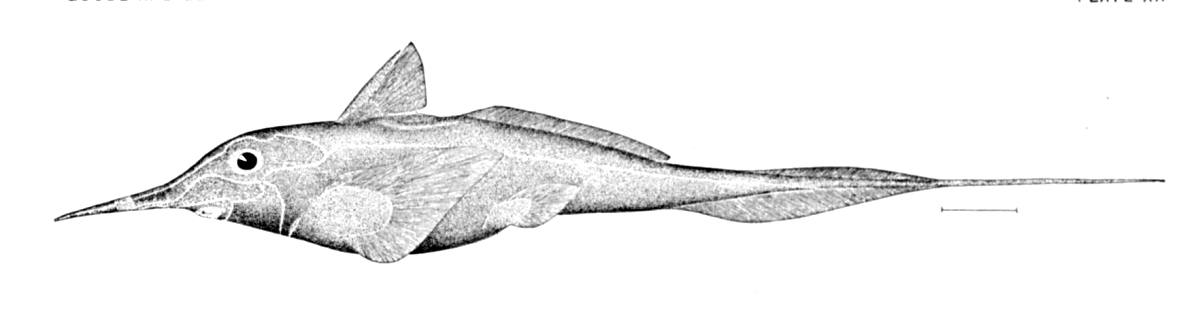
Harriotta raleighana

In some classifications, the chimaeras are included (as subclass Holocephali) in the class Chondrichthyes of cartilaginous fishes; in other systems, this distinction may be raised to the level of class. Chimaeras also have some characteristics of bony fishes.

A renewed effort to explore deep water and to undertake taxonomic analysis of specimens in museum collections led to a boom during the first decade of the 21st century in the number of new species identified. A preliminary study found 8% of species to be threatened. There are over 50 extant species in six genera and three families, with other genera known from fossils. The extant species fall into three families—the Callorhinchidae, Rhinochimaeridae and Chimaeridae with the callorhinchids being the most basal clade.

Suborder Chimaeroidei Patterson 1965

- Family Callorhinchidae Garman, 1901
  - Genus Callorhinchus Lacépède, 1798 (3 extant species) Mid-Cretaceous–recent
- Family Chimaeridae Bonaparte, 1831
  - Genus Chimaera Linnaeus, 1758 (16 species) Eocene–recent
  - Genus Hydrolagus Gill, 1863 (26 species) Miocene–recent
- Family Rhinochimaeridae Garman, 1901
  - Genus Harriotta Goode & Bean, 1895 (2 species)
  - Genus Neoharriotta Bigelow & Schroeder, 1950 (3 species)
  - Genus Rhinochimaera Garman, 1901 (3 species)

== Evolution ==
Tracing the evolution of these species has been problematic given the paucity of good fossils. DNA sequencing has become the preferred approach to understanding speciation.

The group containing chimaeras and their close relatives (Holocephali) is thought to have diverged from Elasmobranchii (the group containing modern sharks and rays) during the Devonian, over 380 million years ago. The oldest known chimaeriform is Protochimaera from the Early Carboniferous (338–332 million years ago) of Russia, which is more closely related to modern chimeras (Chimaeroidei) than any other known extinct groups of Chimaeriformes. The earliest known remains attributable to modern chimaeras are known from the Early Jurassic (Pliensbachian) of Europe, but egg cases from the Late Triassic of Yakutia, Russia and New Zealand that resemble those of rhinochimaerids and callorhinchids respectively indicates that they had a global distribution prior to the end of the Triassic. Unlike modern chimaeras, Mesozoic representatives are often found in shallow water settings. Most modern chimaera groups appear to have originated during the Mesozoic Marine Revolution. Modern chimaeras reached their highest ecological diversity during the mid-Cretaceous (Albian to Cenomanian), when they acquired a variety of different dentition types.

It has commonly been assumed that due to being an evolutionarily basal group that is largely found in the deep ocean, modern chimaeras likely colonized the deep ocean during the Mesozoic and used it as a refugium to survive mass extinction events. However, more recent studies indicate that chimaeras were likely a shallow-water group for most of their existence, and only colonized the deep ocean in the aftermath of the Cretaceous-Paleogene extinction event. The plough-nosed chimaeras are the only group to still inhabit shallower waters, in the manner of ancestral chimaera groups.

=== Taxonomy ===
Extinct chimaeriforms include:

- †Suborder Echinochimaeroidei Lund, 1977
  - †Family Echinochimaeridae Lund, 1977
    - †Genus Echinochimaera Lund, 1977 United States, Lower Carboniferous (Serpukhovian)
- †Suborder Squalorajoidei Patterson, 1965 (Lower Carboniferous–Early Jurassic)
  - ?†Genus Sulcacanthus Itano & Duffin, 2023 United States, Lower Carboniferous (Viséan)
  - Family †Squalorajidae Woodward, 1886
    - †Genus Squaloraja Riley, 1833 Europe, Early Jurassic (Hettangian–Sinemurian)
- †Suborder Myriacanthoidei Patterson 1965 (Late Triassic–Late Jurassic; possible Carboniferous records)
  - †Family Chimaeropsidae
    - †Chimaeropsis Zittel 1887 Belgium, Early Jurassic (Sinemurian), Germany, Late Jurassic
  - †Family Myriacanthidae Woodward 1889
    - †Acanthorhina Fraas 1910 Posidonia Shale Formation, Germany, Early Jurassic (Toarcian)
    - †Agkistracanthus Duffin and Furrer 1981 Austria, England and Switzerland, Late Triassic–Early Jurassic (Rhaetian–Sinemurian)
    - †Alethodontus Duffin 1983 Germany, Early Jurassic (Sinemurian)
    - †Halonodon Duffin 1984 Belgium and Luxembourg, Early Jurassic (Sinemurian)
    - †Metopacanthus Zittel 1887 Posidonia Shale Formation, Germany, Early Jurassic (Toarcian)
    - †Oblidens Duffin and Milàn 2017 Hasle Formation, Denmark, Early Jurassic (Pliensbachian)
    - †Myriacanthus Agassiz 1837 United Kingdom, Late Triassic-Early Jurassic (Rhaetian–Sinemurian)
    - †Recurvacanthus Duffin 1981 United Kingdom, Early Jurassic (Sinemurian)
- †Suborder Protochimaeroidei Lebedev & Popov in Lebedev et al., 2021
  - †Family Protochimaeridae Lebedev & Popov in Lebedev et al., 2021
    - †Genus Protochimaera Lebedev & Popov in Lebedev et al., 2021 Moscow Region, Russia, Lower Carboniferous (Viséan–Serpukhovian)
- Suborder Chimaeroidei Patterson 1965
  - †Eomanodon Ward and Duffin 1989 United Kingdom, Early Jurassic (Pliensbachian)
  - Family Callorhinchidae Garman, 1901
    - †Brachymylus A. S. Woodward 1894 Germany, Early Jurassic (Pliensbachian)
    - †Bathytheristes Duffin 1995 Posidonia Shale Formation, Germany, Early Jurassic (Toarcian)
    - †Ottangodus Popov, Delsate & Felten, 2019 France, Middle Jurassic (Bajocian)
    - †Moskovirhynchus Russia, Upper Jurassic
    - †Pachymylus United Kingdom, France, Middle Jurassic
  - Family †"Edaphodontidae"
    - †Ischyodus (40 species) Worldwide, Middle Jurassic–Miocene (also placed in Callorhinchidae)
    - †Elasmodectes Europe, Jurassic–Cretaceous
    - †Elasmodus Worldwide, Cretaceous–Paleogene
    - †Edaphodon Worldwide, Cretaceous–Neogene
    - †Ptyktoptychion Australia, Early Cretaceous
    - †Lebediodon Europe, Cretaceous
  - Family Chimaeridae Bonaparte, 1831
    - †Canadodus Popov, Johns & Suntok, 2020 Sooke Formation, Canada, Oligocene
  - Family Rhinochimaeridae Garman, 1901
    - †Amylodon Europe, Late Cretaceous–Oligocene

== See also ==
- List of prehistoric cartilaginous fish
- List of chimaeras
- Acanthothoraci
- Ptyctodontida
