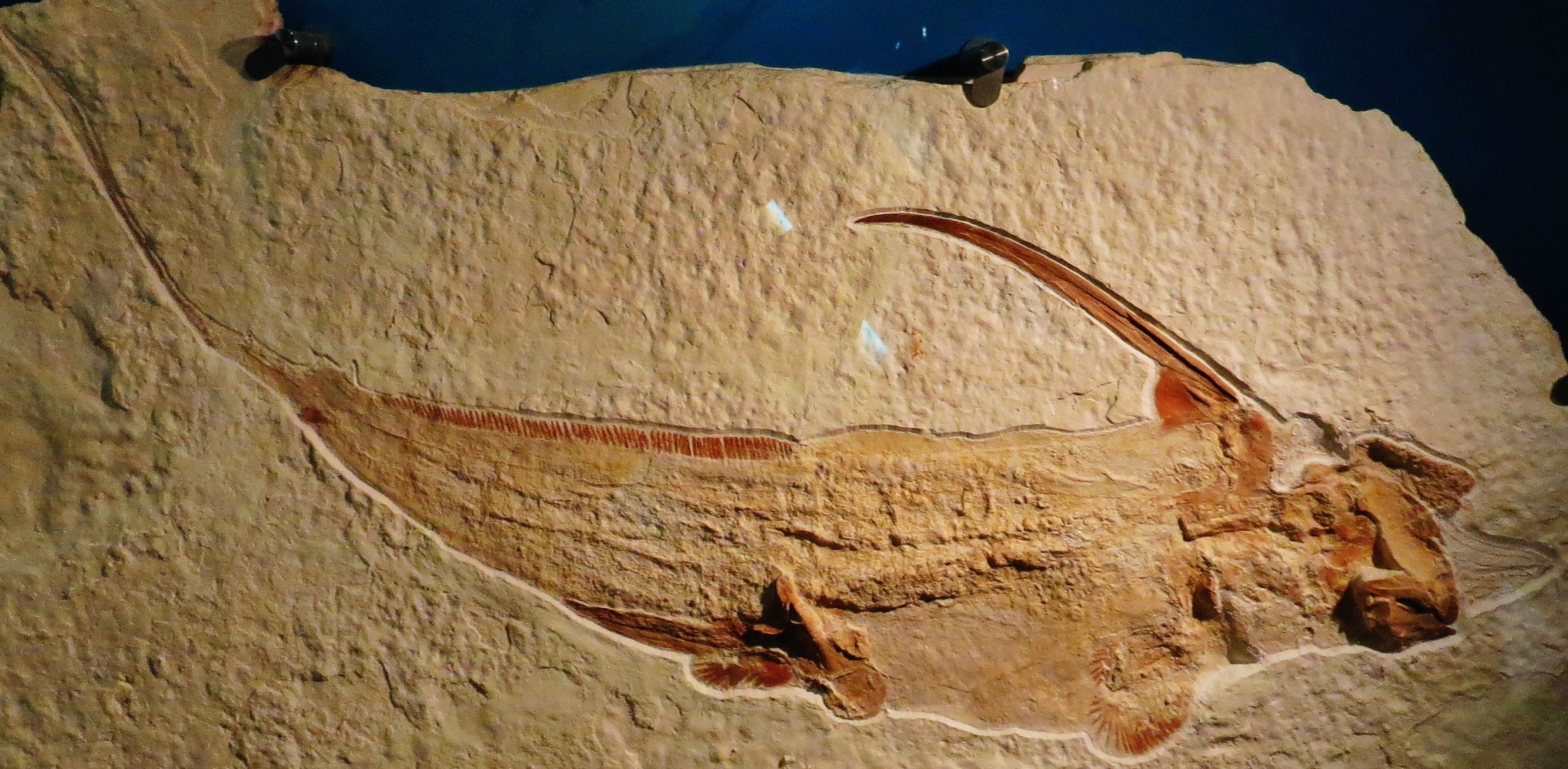
- Nearly complete specimen of Ischyodus quenstedti from the Solnhofen Limestone
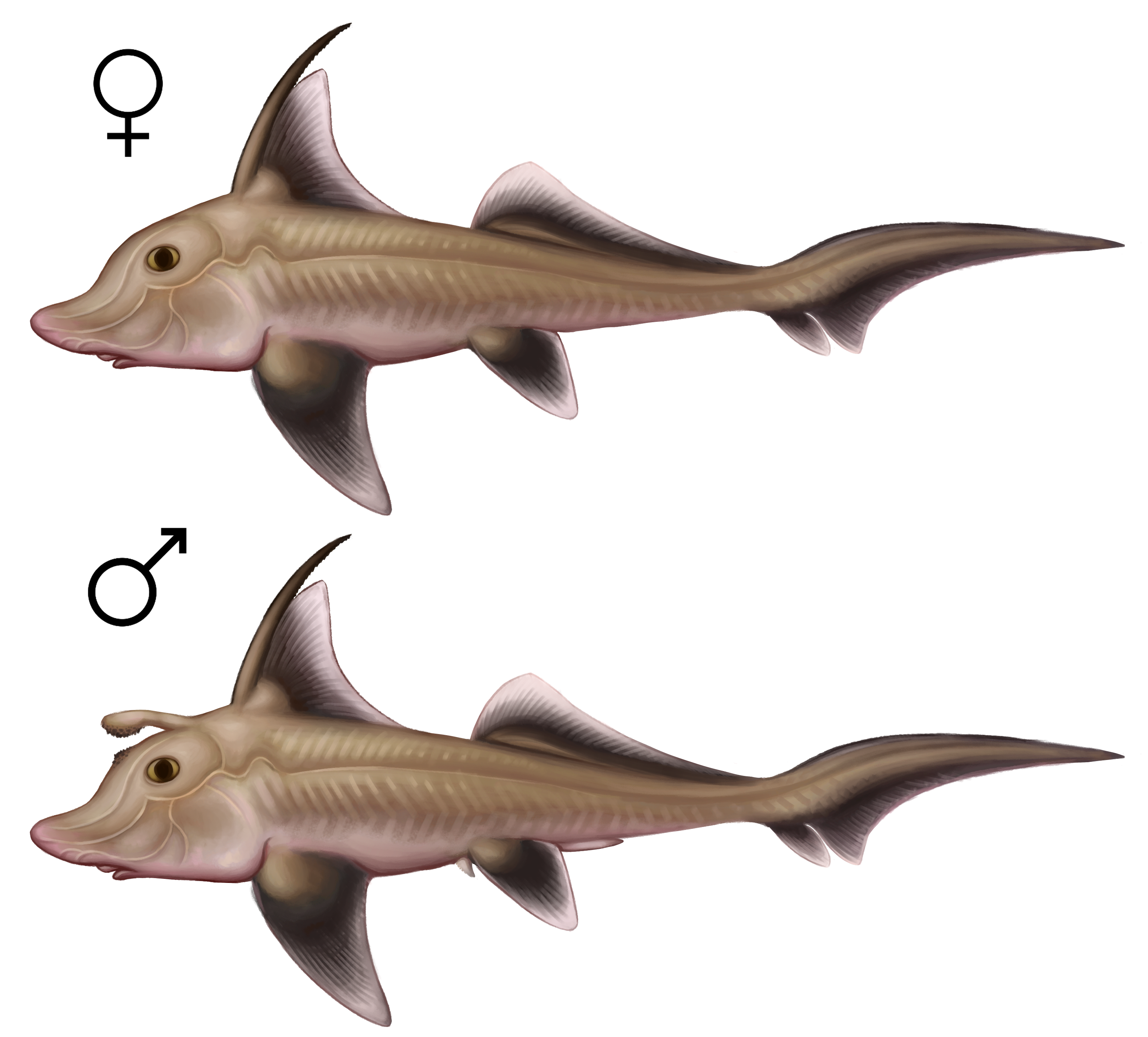
- Life restoration of Ischyodus quenstedti (sometimes considered a synonym of I. egertoni)

Scientific classification
- Kingdom: Animalia
- Phylum: Chordata
- Class: Chondrichthyes
- Subclass: Holocephali
- Order: Chimaeriformes
- Family: Callorhinchidae
- Genus: †Ischyodus; Egerton, 1843

Species
- Ischyodus bifurcatus; Ischyodus brevirostris; Ischyodus dolloi; Ischyodus gubkini; Ischyodus incisus; Ischyodus latus; Ischyodus lonzeensis; Ischyodus minor; Ischyodus mortoni; Ischyodus planus; Ischyodus rayhaasi; Ischyodus thurmanni; Ischyodus townsendi; Ischyodus williamsae; Ischyodus yanshini; Ischyodus zinsmeisteri

= Ischyodus =

Ischyodus Temporal range: 176–23 Ma Middle Jurassic to Miocene

Extinct genus of chimaera fish

Ischyodus (from Greek: ισχύς ischýs, 'power' and Greek: ὀδούς odoús 'tooth') is an extinct genus of chimaera. It is the most diverse and long-lived chimaera genus, with over 39 species found worldwide spanning over 140 million years from the Middle Jurassic to the Miocene. Almost all species are only known from tooth plates, with the exception of the Jurassic species I. quenstedti. Complete specimens of I. quenstedti from the Late Jurassic of Germany most closely resemble the genus Callorhinchus amongst living chimaera genera. It is sometimes placed in the "Edaphodontidae", a unclearly defined group of chimaera with an uncertain position within the clade, while other authors place it into Callorhinchidae along with Callorhinchus, a position that has been supported by at least some phylogenetic analyses. It is suggested therefore to probably have had a similar ecology to living Callorhinchus.

Based on complete specimens from the Solnhofen Limestone of Germany, the total length is assumed to be 21 times larger than mesiodistal length of mandibular tooth plate. For example, I. bifurcatus with mandibular plate length of 3.2 in (8.2 cm) possibly belongs 5 ft 8 in (1.72 m) long specimen. The front of the head of I. quenstedti has an elongate tapering snout, with the body having a long, unornamented dorsal fin spine, as well as a heterocercal tail fin.
