= Anthony Fiorillo =

American paleontologist

Anthony R. Fiorillo
- Citizenship: American
- Education: University of Connecticut, University of Nebraska–Lincoln, University of Pennsylvania
- Scientific career
- Fields: Paleontology
- Workplaces: New Mexico Museum of Natural History & Science
- Author abbrev. (zoology): Tony Fiorillo

Anthony Ricardo Fiorillo is an American paleontologist and the executive director of the New Mexico Museum of Natural History and Science. He is also an adjunct faculty research professor at Southern Methodist University. For many years he was vice president of research & collections and chief curator at the Perot Museum of Nature & Science. A native of Connecticut, he received his bachelor's at the University of Connecticut, his master's at the University of Nebraska–Lincoln and a Ph.D. in Vertebrate Paleontology from the University of Pennsylvania.

== Career ==
Dr. Fiorillo worked on his Rea Postdoctoral Fellowship at the Carnegie Museum of Natural History in Pittsburgh, Pennsylvania and later as a scientist at the University of California, Berkeley.

In 1995 he became a curator at the Dallas Museum of Natural History (now the Perot Museum of Nature and Science).

In 2022, Fiorillo was appointed executive director of the New Mexico Museum of Natural History and Science.

He is currently the Executive Director of the New Mexico Museum of Natural History and Science and is an adjunct faculty research professor at Southern Methodist University.

He has worked with the National Park Service in several national park units including Big Bend National Park, Denali National Park, Aniakchak National Monument, and Wrangell-St. Elias National Park to identify, study and preserve dinosaur fossils found. Fiorillo received the National Park Service Alaska Region Natural Resource Research Award in 2000 and again in 2007. In 2008, he was honored with a fellowship in the Geological Society of America., as well as becoming a Fellow of the Explorers Club in 2013. For his long-time commitment to dinosaur paleontology within the National Park units in Alaska, he was recognized by the international George Wright Society in 2019 with the prestigious Natural Resource Achievement Award.

Since 1998 the primary focus of his work has been on polar dinosaurs, and more specifically the ancient Arctic dinosaurs of Alaska. Of the four Alaskan dinosaurs that have names, Fiorillo has named two of them: Pachyrhinosaurus perotorum and Nanuqsaurus hoglundi, which he named in honor of major supporters of his former museum. P. perotorum is christened after the billionaire Ross Perot and his family. Although Perot is not necessarily connected to Alaska or paleontology, he has given generously to the Perot Museum, which also bears his name. N. hoglundi is named for Forrest Hoglund, a Texas oil millionaire who has also donated generously. Fiorillo and his colleagues have unearthed new polar dinosaurs as well as obtained insights into the ancient polar climate during one of Earth's greenhouse modes. In addition to Alaska, his work has taken him to Japan, Mongolia, and South Korea to explore the ancient land bridge connection between Asia and North America during the Cretaceous, a geographic connection often referred to as Beringia. His travels also include Australia, Italy, Peru, and Bolivia in order to further his research. He has published approximately 140 technical papers.

Below is a list of taxa that Fiorillo has contributed to naming:

| Year | Taxon | Authors |
|---|---|---|
| 2025 | Duonychus tsogtbaatari gen. et sp. nov. | Kobayashi, Zelenitsky, Fiorillo, & Chinzorig |
| 2024 | Tyrannosaurus mcraeensis sp. nov. | Dalman, Loewen, Pyron, Jasinski, Malinzak, Lucas, Fiorillo, Currie, & Longrich |
| 2022 | Paralitherizinosaurus japonicus gen. et sp. nov. | Kobayashi, Takasaki, Fiorillo, Chinzorig, & Hikida |
| 2021 | Yamatosaurus izanagii gen. et sp. nov. | Kobayashi, Takasaki, Kubota, & Fiorillo |
| 2019 | Unnuakomys hutchisoni gen. et sp. nov. | Eberle, Clemens, McCarthy, Fiorillo, Erickson, & Druckenmiller |
| 2019 | Kamuysaurus japonicus gen. et sp. nov. | Kobayashi, Nishimura, Takasaki, Chiba, Fiorillo, Tanaka, Chinzorig, Sato, & Sakurai |
| 2018 | Chupkaornis keraorum gen. et sp. nov. | Tanaka, Kobayashi, Kurihara, Fiorillo, & Kano |
| 2016 | Ounalashkastylus tomidai gen. et sp. nov. | Chiba, Fiorillo, Jacobs, Kimura, Kobayashi, Kohno, Nishida, Polcyn, & Tanaka |
| 2014 | Nanuqsaurus hoglundi gen. et sp. nov. | Fiorillo & Tykoski |
| 2010 | Flexomornis howei gen. et sp. nov. | Tykoski & Fiorillo |

== Published work ==
=== Books ===
Anthony Fiorillo has collaborated on these books and volumes:

- Rogers, Raymond R.; Eberth, David A; Fiorillo, Anthony R. (January 30, 2008). Bonebeds: Genesis, Analysis, and Paleobiological Significance. University of Chicago Press. ISBN 978-0-226-72371-6.
- Scotchmoor, Judy G.; Springer, Dale A.; Breithaupt, Brent H.; Fiorillo, Anthony R. (January 1, 2002). Dinosaurs: The Science Behind the Stories. Alexandria, VA: American Geological Institute. ISBN 978-0-922152-62-9.
- Fiorillo, Anthony, R., and McCarthy, Paul, J. 2010. Ancient polar ecosystems and environments. Selected papers based on Geological Society of America Annual Meeting, Theme Session 10, Ancient polar ecosystems and environments: proxies for understanding climate change and global warming. Palaeogeography, Palaeoclimatology, Palaeoecology 295:345-442.
- McCarthy, Paul, J., Fiorillo, Anthony, R., and Taylor, Edith, L. 2016. Ancient polar ecosystems and paleoclimate in deep time: Evidence from the past, implications for the future. Palaeogeography, Palaeoclimatology, Palaeoecology. 441:223-389.
- Fiorillo, Anthony, R., Forster, Catherine, A., and Weishampel, David, B. 2023. Dinosaurs: New Ideas from Old Bones. The Anatomical Record. 306: 1589-1975.

He has also written the following book:

- Fiorillo, Anthony, R., 2018. Alaska Dinosaurs: an Ancient Arctic World. CRC Press, Boca Raton. 224p. https://www.crcpress.com/Alaska-Dinosaurs-An-Ancient-Arctic-World/Fiorillo/p/book/9781138060876

=== Sample of other publications ===
- Fiorillo, Anthony R.; Tykoski, Ronald S. (2012). "A new Maastrichtian species of the centrosaurine ceratopsid Pachyrhinosaurus from the North Slope of Alaska". Acta Palaeontologica Polonica. 57 (3): 561–573. doi:10.4202/app.2011.0033. ISSN 0567-7920.
- Fiorillo, A. R.; Adams, T. L. (2012). "A therizinosaur track from the lower Cantwell Formation (Upper Cretaceous) of Denali National Park, Alaska". PALAIOS. 27 (6): 395–400. Bibcode:2012Palai..27..395F. doi:10.2110/palo.2011.p11-083r. ISSN 0883-1351. S2CID 129517554.
- Gangloff, R. A.; Fiorillo, A. R. (2010). "Taphonomy and paleoecology of a bonebed from the Prince Creek Formation, North Slope, Alaska". PALAIOS. 25 (5): 299–317. Bibcode:2010Palai..25..299G. doi:10.2110/palo.2009.p09-103r. ISSN 0883-1351. S2CID 129462883.
- Fiorillo, A. R.; Hasiotis, S. T.; Kobayashi, Y.; Tomsich, C. S. (2009). "A pterosaur manus track from Denali National Park, Alaska Range, Alaska, United States". PALAIOS. 24 (7): 466–472. Bibcode:2009Palai..24..466F. doi:10.2110/palo.2008.p08-129r. ISSN 0883-1351. S2CID 130829034.
- Fiorillo, A. R. (2008). "On the Occurrence of Exceptionally Large Teeth of Troodon (Dinosauria: Saurischia) from the Late Cretaceous of Northern Alaska". PALAIOS. 23 (5): 322–328. Bibcode:2008Palai..23..322F. doi:10.2110/palo.2007.p07-036r. ISSN 0883-1351. S2CID 140657219.
- Fiorillo, Anthony R.; Padian, Kevin; Musikasinthorn, Chayanin (2000). "Taphonomy and Depositional Setting of the Placerias Quarry (Chinle Formation: Late Triassic, Arizona)". PALAIOS. 15 (5): 373. Bibcode:2000Palai..15..373F. doi:10.1669/0883-1351(2000)015<0373:TADSOT>2.0.CO;2. ISSN 0883-1351. S2CID 130605819.
- Fiorillo, A.R. (1995). "Enamel microstructure in Diplodocus, Camarasaurus, and Brachiosaurus (Dinosauria: Sauropoda) and its lack of influence on resource partitioning by sauropods in the Late Jurassic". In Sun, Ailing; Wang, Yuanqing (eds.). Sixth Symposium on Mesozoic Terrestrial Ecosystems and Biota: Short Papers. Beijing: China Ocean Press. pp. 147–149. ISBN 978-7-5027-3898-3.
- Fiorillo, A.R. (1994). "Time resolution at Carnegie Quarry (Morrison Formation: Dinosaur National Monument, Utah): implications for dinosaur paleoecology". Contributions to Geology. 30. University of Wyoming: 149–156.
- Fiorillo, Anthony R.; Currie, Philip J. (1994). "Theropod teeth from the Judith River Formation (Upper Cretaceous) of south-central Montana" (PDF). Journal of Vertebrate Paleontology. 14 (1): 74–80. Bibcode:1994JVPal..14...74F. doi:10.1080/02724634.1994.10011539. ISSN 0272-4634.

== Personal life ==
Dr. Fiorillo currently resides in Albuquerque, New Mexico.
