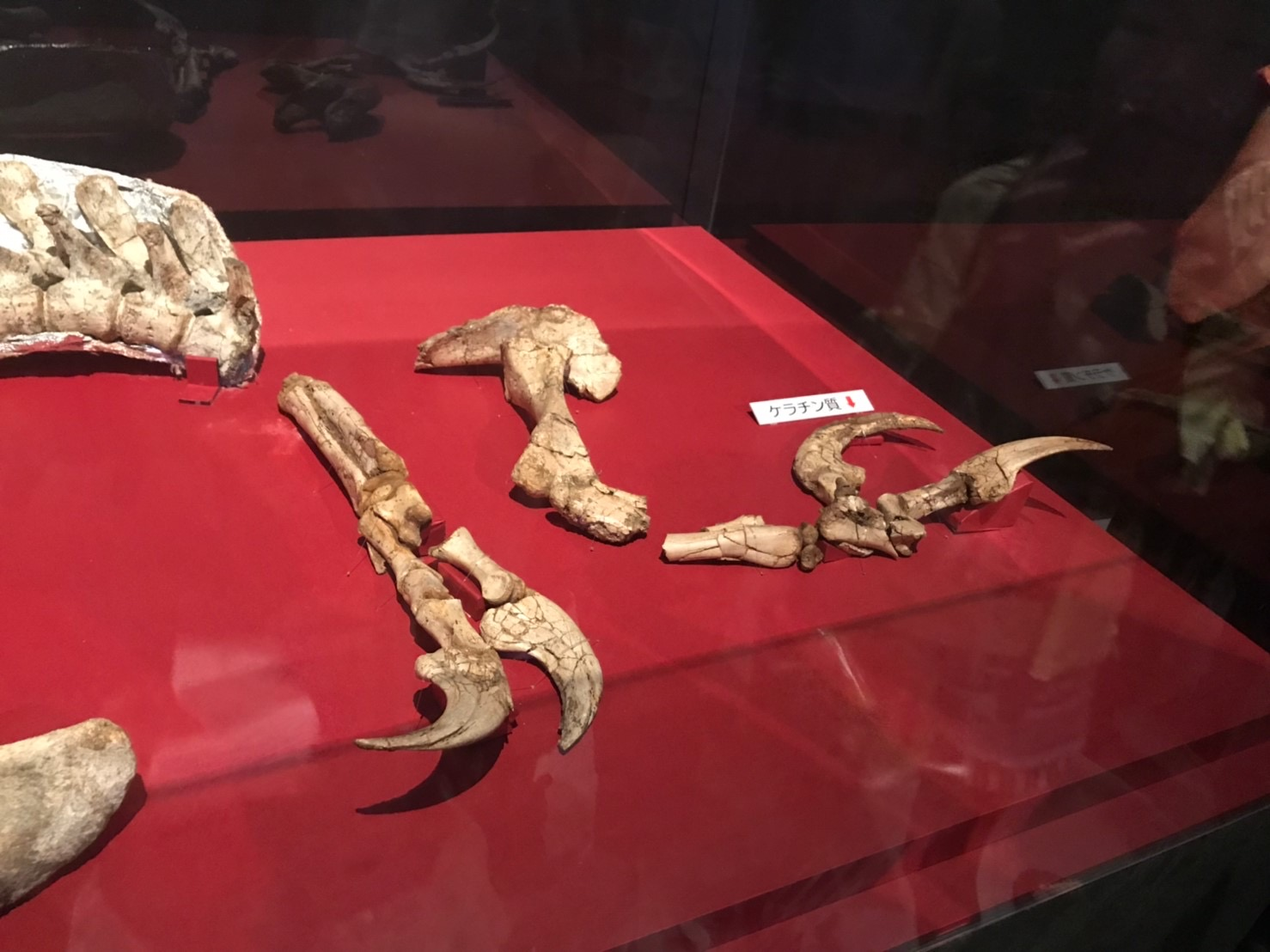
- Limb elements

Scientific classification
- Kingdom: Animalia
- Phylum: Chordata
- Class: Reptilia
- Clade: Dinosauria
- Clade: Saurischia
- Clade: Theropoda
- Family: †Therizinosauridae
- Genus: †Duonychus; Kobayashi et al., 2025
- Species: †D. tsogtbaatari

Binomial name
- †Duonychus tsogtbaatari Kobayashi et al., 2025

= Duonychus =

Duonychus Temporal range: Late Cretaceous (Cenomanian–Coniacian), ~96–90 Ma

Genus of therizinosaurid dinosaurs

Duonychus (meaning "two claws") is an extinct genus of therizinosaurid theropod dinosaurs that lived during the Late Cretaceous (Cenomanian to early Coniacian age) of what is now Mongolia. It is known from a partial skeleton, including several vertebrae, most of the forelimbs, and part of the pelvic girdle, found in outcrops of the Bayanshiree Formation. The remains were discovered in 2012 by the Mongolian Academy of Sciences and briefly mentioned in later conference abstracts. The genus contains a single species, Duonychus tsogtbaatari, which was formally described in 2025.

The hand of Duonychus only has two fingers, similar to tyrannosaurids, compared to the three commonly found in most theropods. This anatomical feature—in addition to its long, strongly curved claws—may have allowed Duonychus to efficiently grasp plant material to consume. The geological formation from which Duonychus is known has also yielded the therizinosaurs Enigmosaurus, Erlikosaurus, and Segnosaurus, in addition to many other dinosaurs.

== Discovery and naming ==
Duonychus type locality in the eastern Gobi Desert of Mongolia

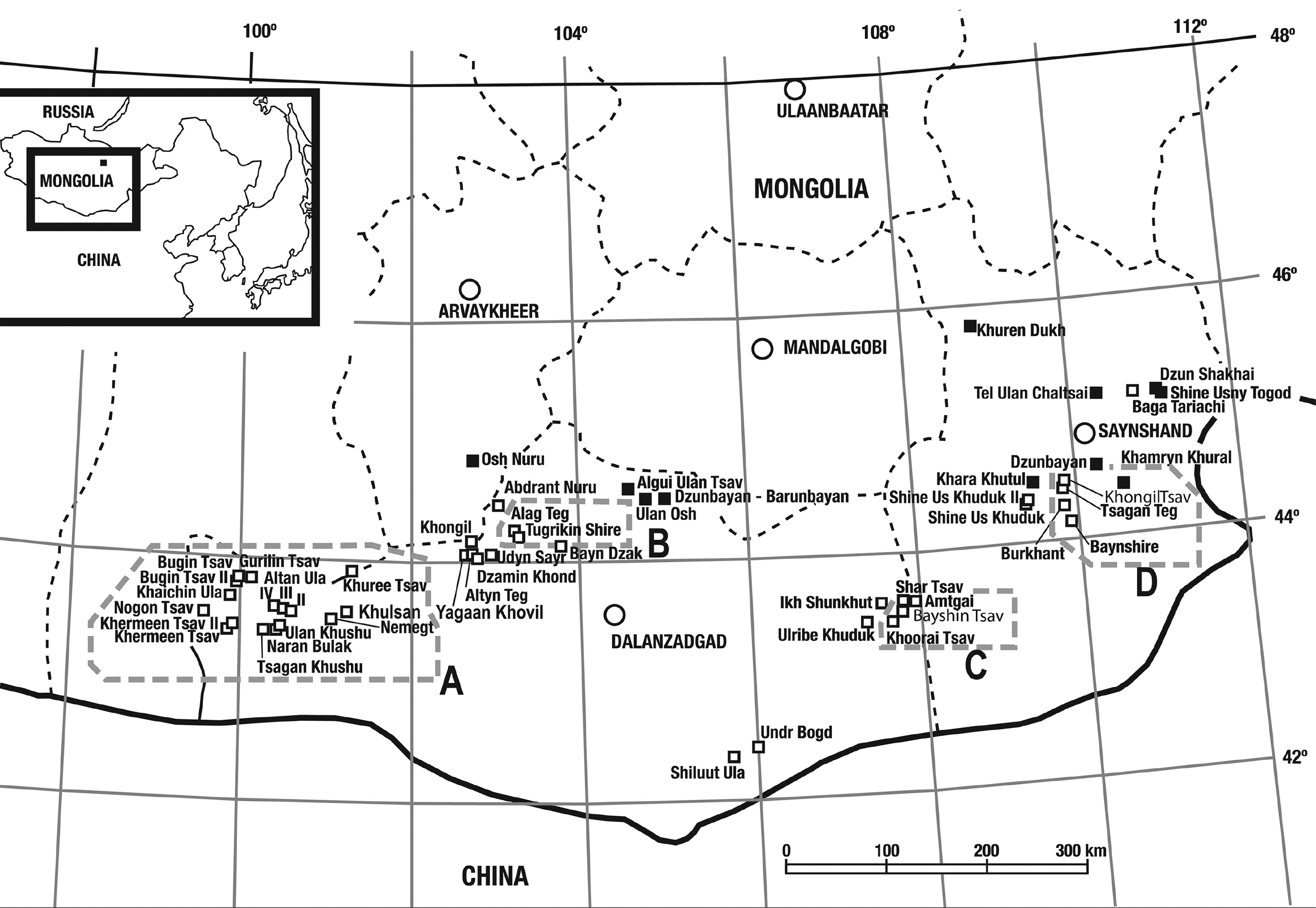
Mongolian Cretaceous fossil localities; Duonychus is known from the Urlibe Khudak locality near Area C (Bayanshiree Formation)

In 2012, the Institute of Paleontology (Mongolian Academy of Sciences) was involved in the construction of a water pipeline in the eastern Gobi Desert of southeastern Mongolia. Part of this work was conducted near Khanbogd town in Ömnögovi Province. One particular outcrop representing the Bayanshiree Formation ('Urlibe Khudak' locality) yielded the fossil skeleton of a therizinosaurid dinosaur. The excavation of the specimen, led by Idersaikhan Damdinsuren and Ganzorig Bayasgaa with the assistance of other Mongolians, occurred under limited time constraints, restricting the amount of material that could be collected. Furthermore, the specimen was found at the base of a fluvial sandstone bed with pebbles; this high-energy depositional environment, representing a channel lag deposit, also contributed to the incompleteness of the skeleton.

Over the following years, the collected specimen was carefully prepared by Chagnaa Bayardorj. The material comprises a partial semi-articulated skeleton, including six dorsal vertebrae and some partial ribs, six sacral vertebrae with corresponding ribs, the first caudal vertebra, part of the left scapula and coracoid, both nearly complete forelimbs and hands (humeri, ulnae, radii, carpals, manus), and part of both pelvic girdles (right ilium, both pubes, and the top of the left ischium).

Prior to its formal description, the fossil material was first reported in two Society of Vertebrate Paleontology conference abstracts in 2015 and 2024.

In 2025, Yoshitsugu Kobayashi, Darla Zelenitsky, Anthony Fiorillo, and Tsogtbaatar Chinzorig coauthored a scientific paper in the academic journal iScience. Herein the authors described Duonychus tsogtbaatari as a new genus and species of therizinosaurs, establishing this specimen (MPC-D 100/85) as the holotype. The generic name, Duonychus, combines the Latin word duo, meaning "two" with the Ancient Greek ὄνυξ (ónux), meaning "claw", in reference to the two-fingered hand of the taxon. The specific name, tsogtbaatari, honors Mongolian paleontologist Khishigjav Tsogtbaatar, a former director of the Institute of Paleontology.

== Description ==
Size compared to a human

The Duonychus holotype belongs to an immature individual with an estimated body mass of approximately 260 kilograms (570 lb), similar in size to Erlikosaurus, which is around 278 kilograms (613 lb). In comparison, the other coeval Enigmosaurus and Segnosaurus were larger, at 567 kilograms (1,250 lb) and 1,469 kilograms (3,239 lb), respectively. Although no estimate of body length was given in the academic description of the taxon in 2025, the accompanying press release noted that the animal would have reached approximately 3 metres (9.8 ft) long.

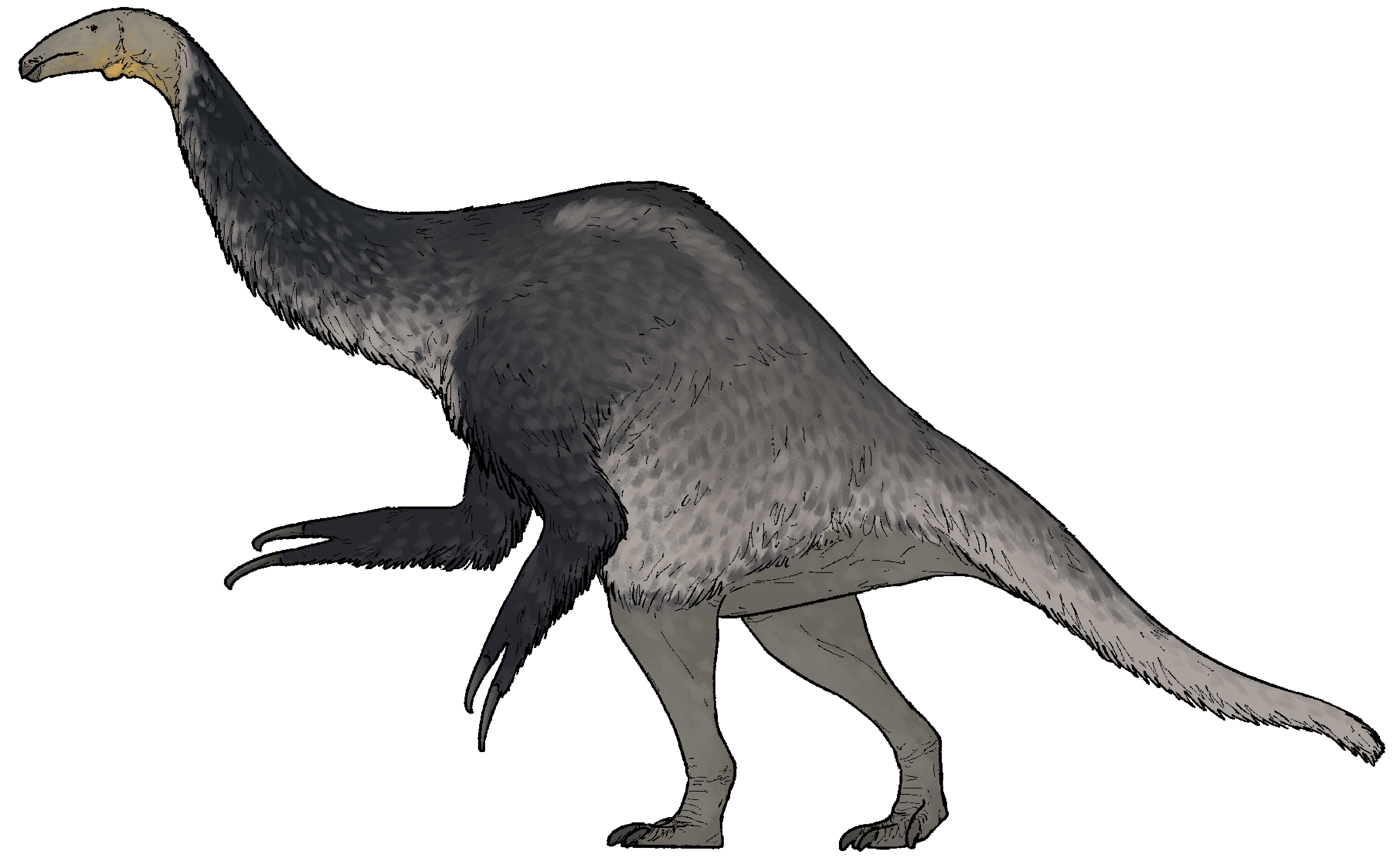
Speculative life restoration

The manus of Duonychus is well preserved, representing the first known complete keratinous claw among non-paravian theropods. The structure of the extremely reduced third metacarpal is like a splint, unlike that of other therizinosaurs which had well-developed proximal and distal ends. The absence of the third digit indicates that Duonychus is functionally didactyl, which is the first known example among therizinosaurs. The manual unguals (hand claws) are large and curved, as is generally seen in therizinosaurs. However, one of the unguals preserves a keratinous sheath, an expected feature but one rarely fossilized. The measured curvature of the keratinous sheath is approximately 120°, longer than the curvature of the claw, indicating that the keratin increases the overall length of the claw by more than 40%.

Unlike other therizinosaurs, the elbow and the first digit of Duonychus had a limited range of motion similar to that of the tyrannosaurid Tyrannosaurus and the oviraptorid Oksoko, both of which are theropods with didactyl manus. The claw joint was able to flex nearly perpendicular to the preceding phalanx, which is a condition not known among other therizinosaurs or didactyl theropods. The strong flexion of the claw joint and the strong curvature of the keratinous claw would have helped Duonychus during feeding to effectively grasp and pull down vegetation to its mouth, in a manner similar to some modern mammals.

== Classification ==
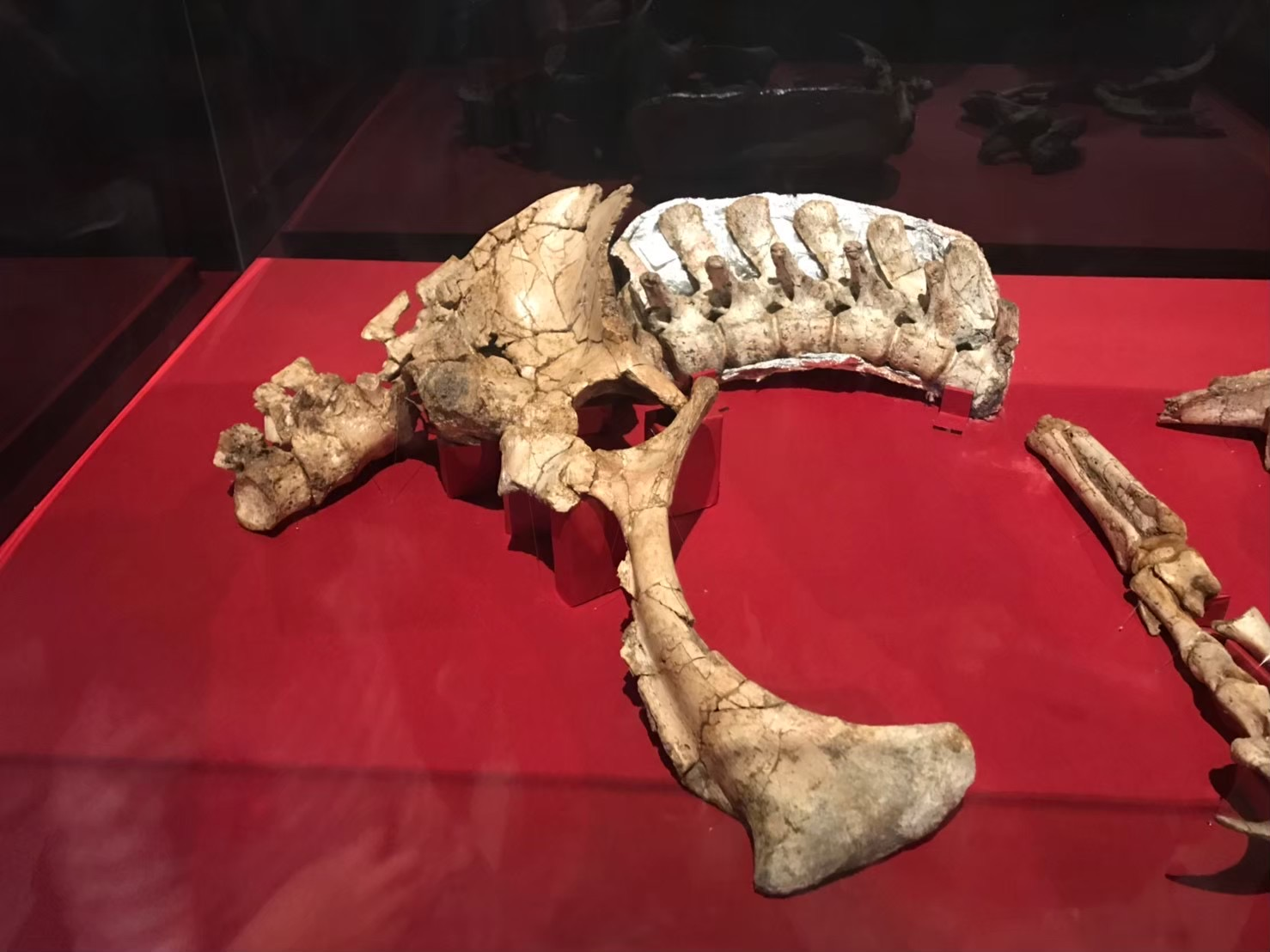
Pelvis and vertebrae

In their phylogenetic analyses, Kobayashi et al. (2025) recovered Duonychus as a member of the therizinosaur family Therizinosauridae, in an unresolved polytomy (more than one branch descending from a single node) with Nanshiungosaurus—a taxon from the Nanxiong Formation of China—and a clade containing other derived therizinosaurids. These results are displayed in the cladogram below:

- Therizinosauria
  - Falcarius
  - - Jianchangosaurus
    - - Beipiaosaurus
      - - Alxasaurus
        - Therizinosauridae
          - - Neimongosaurus
            - Erliansaurus
          - - Enigmosaurus
            - - - - Segnosaurus
                  - Erlikosaurus
                - - Nothronychus mckinleyi
                  - Nothronychus graffami
              - - Duonychus
                - Nanshiungosaurus
                - - - Suzhousaurus
                    - Bissekty therizinosaurid
                    - Paralitherizinosaurus
                    - Therizinosaurus

== Paleoenvironment ==
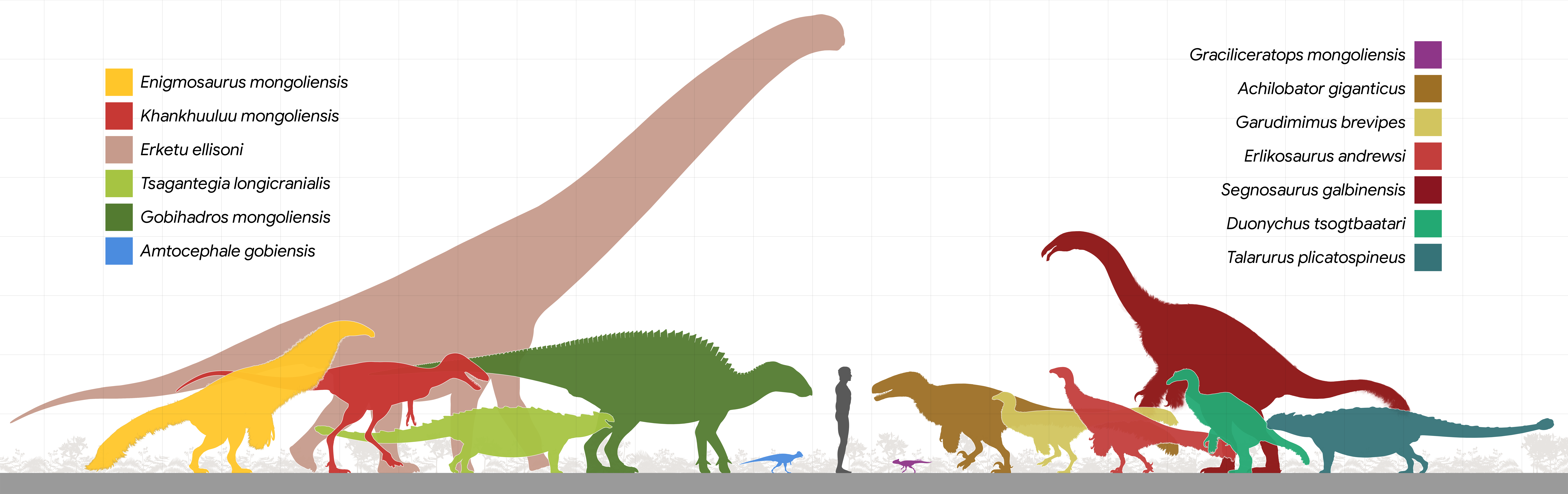
Size of many dinosaurs known from the Bayanshiree Formation (Duonychus shown in aqua, right)

Duonychus is known from the 'Urlibe Khudak' locality of the Bayanshiree Formation. The examination of the magnetostratigraphy of the formation seems to confirm that the entire Bayanshiree lies within the Cretaceous Long Normal, which lasted only until the end of the Santonian stage. Moreover, calcite U–Pb measurements estimate the age of the Bayanshiree Formation from 95.9 ± 6.0 million to 89.6 ± 4.0 million years ago, Cenomanian through earliest Coniacian ages.

Fluvial, lacustrine and caliche-based sedimentation indicates a lesser semi-arid climate, with the presence of wet environments composed of large meanders and lakes. Largescale cross-stratification in many of the sandstone layers at the Baynshire and Burkhant localities seems to indicate large meandering rivers, and these large water bodies may have drained the eastern part of the Gobi Desert. Numerous fossilized fruits have been recovered from the Bor Guvé and Khara Khutul localities. A vast diversity of fauna is known in the formation, comprising dinosaur and non-dinosaur genera. Therizinosaurs from other localities within the formation include Segnosaurus, Erlikosaurus, and Enigmosaurus. Fellow theropods include the tyrannosauroid Khankhuuluu, the large dromaeosaurid Achillobator, and the ornithomimosaur Garudimimus. Other herbivorous dinosaurs are represented by the ankylosaurs Talarurus and Tsagantegia, small marginocephalians Amtocephale and Graciliceratops, the hadrosauroid Gobihadros, and the sauropod Erketu. Other fauna include semiaquatic reptiles like crocodylomorphs and nanhsiungchelyid turtles.
