= Freddius =

Scientific classification
- Kingdom: Animalia
- Phylum: Platyhelminthes
- Order: Rhabdocoela
- Family: Cheliplanidae
- Genus: Freddius; Takeda & Kajihara, 2018
- Species: F. tricaudatus

Binomial name
- Freddius tricaudatus Takeda & Kajihara, 2018

Species of rhabdocoel flatworms

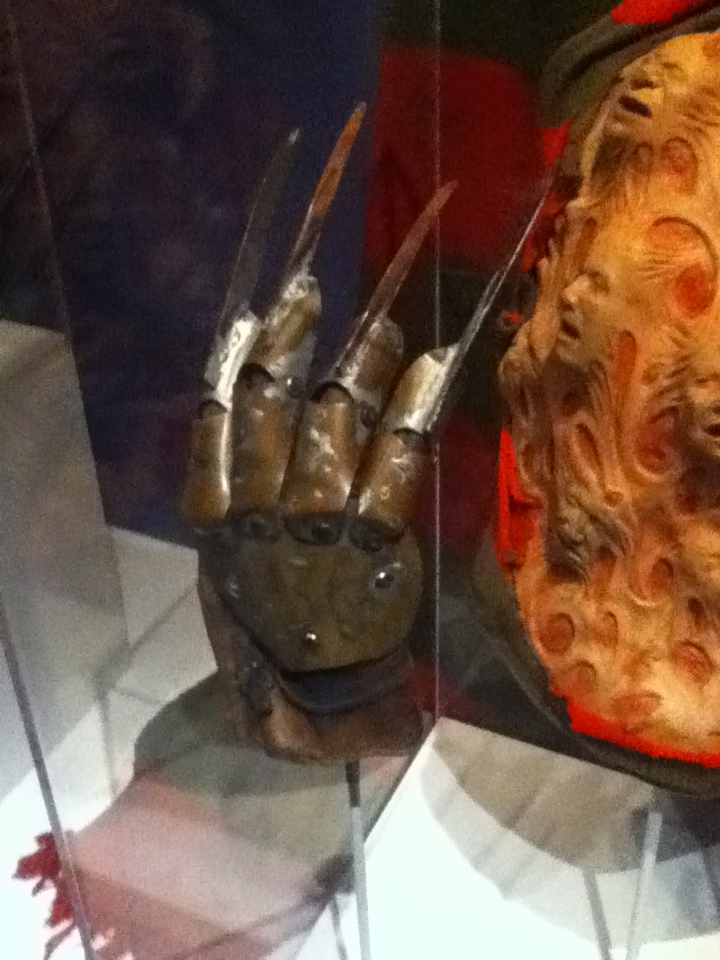
A prop of Freddy Krueger's clawed glove

Freddius is a genus of rhabdocoel flatworms in the family Cheliplanidae containing a single species Freddius tricaudatus. The species is native to sandy intertidal zone areas of northern Japan. It was first described in 2018 and the species was placed in a new genus based on the distinct proboscis morphology. The genus was named after the horror film character Freddy Krueger, and the species named for the tri-lobed tail.

== Description ==
Adults are around 900 μm long and 130 μm wide and are blind, with no eyes or eyespots present. The rear portion of the body is divided into three tail-like appendages. The genital pore is located on the underside of the body, to the rear of the male copulatory organ. To the rear of the pore is the ovary with two yolk glands. The tubular male organ, to the rear of the pharynx, has a muscular and bulbous frontal region, and a rear area with a ring of conical cirrus spines. To the front of the pharynx is the mouth and a group of sacs whose function is unknown. In front of those and to the rear of the proboscis gland is the single testis, which is not separated into follicles. The proboscis has two asymmetrical hooks with three movable "nails" associated on each. One hook is longer than the other and has an extra two nails in lateral positioning to the hook and three anterior nails. The lateral nails are mobile as well and have small side spikes. The hooks and spines have similar look to the razor gloves of Freddy Krueger.

== History and classification ==
Over the period June 13, 2011, to July 1, 2013, sediment sampling was performed by lead author biologist Naoya Takeda across five locations around Hokkaido. Specimens were subsequently washed and collected for mounting, study, and museum preservation. Included in the collected specimens were a group of seven adult flatworms collected on June 15, 2012, and another three collected on June 24, 2013, that were new to the researchers. The type series were deposited in the invertebrate collections of Hokkaido University Museum, with "ICHUM 4832" designated as the holotype, and the remaining nine designated as paratypes. Six of the paratypes, three collected June 15, 2012, and three on June 24, 2013, were preserved as whole body mounts, while the remaining three are fluorescent phalloidin stained. Takeda partnered with Hiroshi Kajihara to describe the specimens in a 2013 Species Diversity journal paper. They named a new genus and species for the specimens and placed them into the family Cheliplanidae.

The specific epithet tricaudatus was chosen in reference to the presence of three tails on the adults. Based on the presence of the mobile proboscis hooks on the adults proboscis Takeda and Kajihara chose to place the species into the newly named genus. They coined the name Freddius for the horror film villain Freddy Krueger of the A Nightmare on Elm Street series. They called out the visual similarity between Krueger's "razor-armed" gloves and the distinctive hooks on the flatworm.

The genus was not placed into an of the Cheliplanidae subfamilies in its initial description. However a 2018 paper describing the genus Dactyloplana from the North Sea noted similarities between the two genera and suggested they may be closely related. The two North Sea species in Dactyloplana have elongated glove-like proboscises that end it groups of two or three non-mobile hooks. There are swellings near the nail bases that the authors suggest could be muscle attachment points as seen in Freddius.

== Distribution and habitat ==
The only known specimens have came from the intertidal beach sands around Akkeshi, Hokkaido, on the southeastern side of the island.

== Ecology and behavior ==
Freddius tricaudatus is a member of the bottom dwelling marine meiofauna, which typically live in the pores between sediment particles in the bottom substrate. The hooks and muscular proboscis is used by hunting adults to capture prey.
