= Yoshitsugu Kobayashi =

Japanese paleontologist

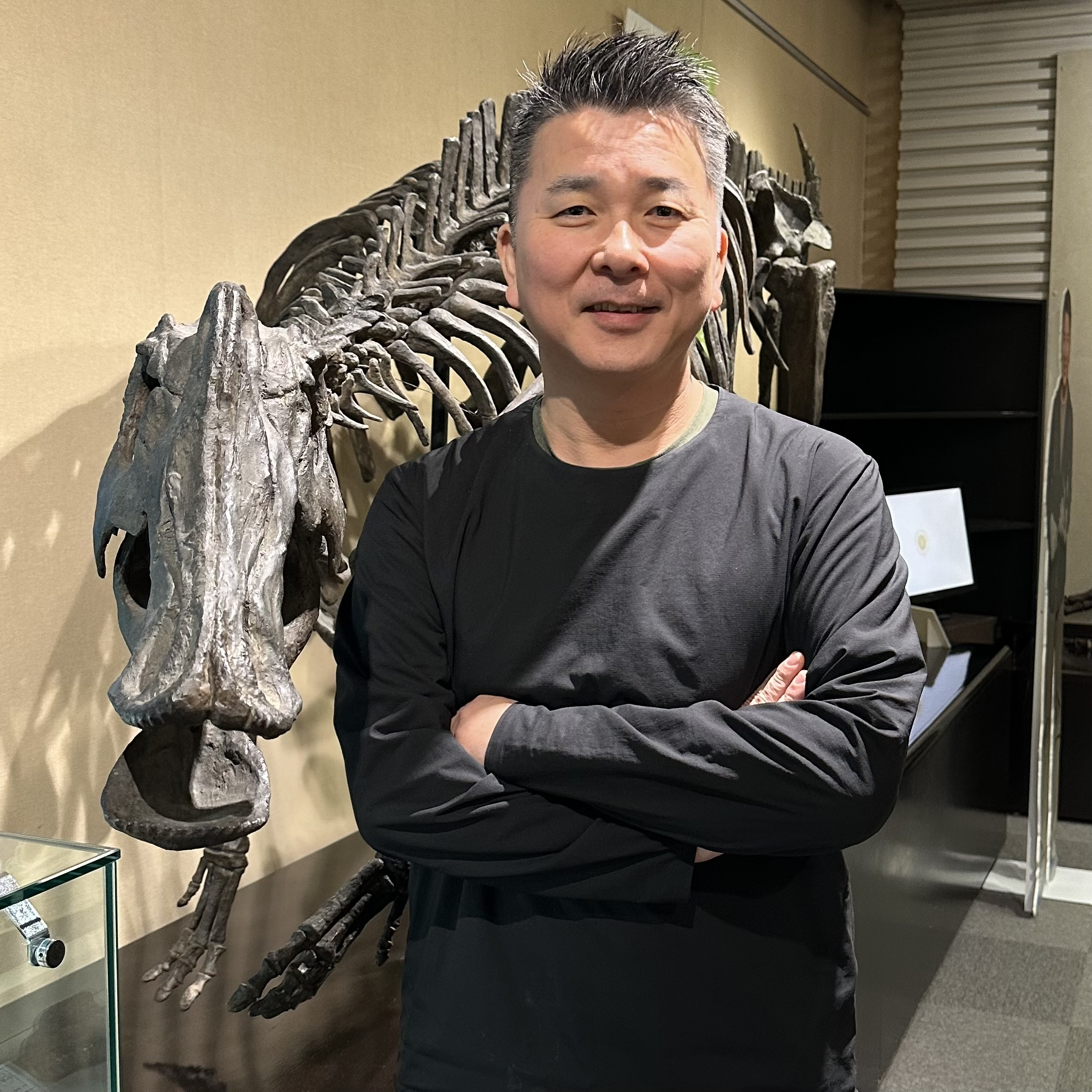
- Yoshitsugu Kobayashi in 2024
- Born: December 23, 1971 (age 54)
- Education: University of Wyoming; Southern Methodist University
- Known for: Description of Fukuisaurus, Kamuysaurus, Yamatosaurus
- Awards: 北海道新聞文化賞 北海道文化賞 科学技術分野の文部科学大臣表彰
- Scientific career
- Fields: paleontology
- Workplaces: Hokkaido University Museum
- Doctoral advisor: Louis L. Jacobs

Yoshitsugu Kobayashi (小林 快次, Kobayashi Yoshitsugu, born 1971) is a Japanese vertebrate paleontologist. He is a professor and the assistant director in Hokkaido University Museum. His major achievements include the description and naming of several dinosaurs from Japan, for example, Kamuysaurus, Yamatosaurus and Paralitherizinosaurus. He is also a research affiliate of Perot Museum of Nature and Science, a member of Jurassic Foundation, a councilor of Palaeontological Society of Japan.

== Education ==
Yoshitsugu Kobayashi was born in Fukui Prefecture, Japan. He attended a junior high school attached to the Faculty of Education at the University of Fukui, where he was a member of the science club under an advisor well versed in geology. In junior high school, he was interested in ammonites and spent after-school hours and holidays excavating fossils. After graduating from junior high school, he went on to Fukui Prefectural Koshi High School. During his first year of high school, he participated in an excavation in Fukui Prefecture, where dinosaur fossils were discovered for the first time in the prefecture, which sparked his strong interest in dinosaurs.

He met an employee of Yokohama National University through the above-mentioned research and entered the university. He left school after one year to study abroad in the United States, entering the University of Wyoming and receiving B.Sc. in Geology under Jason Lillegraven. He then went on to Southern Methodist University, where he earned a M.S. and Ph.D. in Vertebrate Paleontology under Louis L. Jacobs. He studied a variety of taxa during his doctoral studies. He focused on ornithomimosaurian dinosaurs from China and Mongolia, iguanodontian dinosaurs, goniopholidid crocodyliforms from Japan, and therian mammals from Texas.

== Career and academic contributions ==
He also became a curator at the Fukui Prefectural Dinosaur Museum during his doctoral studies. He began his career at the Hokkaido University Museum in 2005 as an assistant, and was promoted to assistant professor in 2008, associate professor in 2009, and professor in 2019. He also became an invited associate professor at the Museum of Osaka University in 2013, and was promoted to invited professor in 2019. In 2023, he had been appointed Special Advisor to the Mukawa Town Hobetsu Museum. During his career, he has received some awards in Japan.

His main research locations include Alaska, Japan, and Mongolia. In 2006 and 2009, Yoshitsugu and his colleague discovered two remains of Deinocheirus, of which the entire body had been unknown until they described the specimens in 2014. He has also contributed to naming some new species of dinosaurs, including the ornithopod Fukuisaurus tetoriensis, therizinosaurian Jianchangosaurus yixianensis, hesperornithean Chupkaornis keraorum, hadrosaurids Kamuysaurus japonicus and Yamatosaurus izanagii, and the therizinosaurids Paralitherizinosaurus japonicus and Duonychus tsogtbaatari.

He has supervised some of NHK's dinosaur programs, including Amazing Dinoworld (2019).
