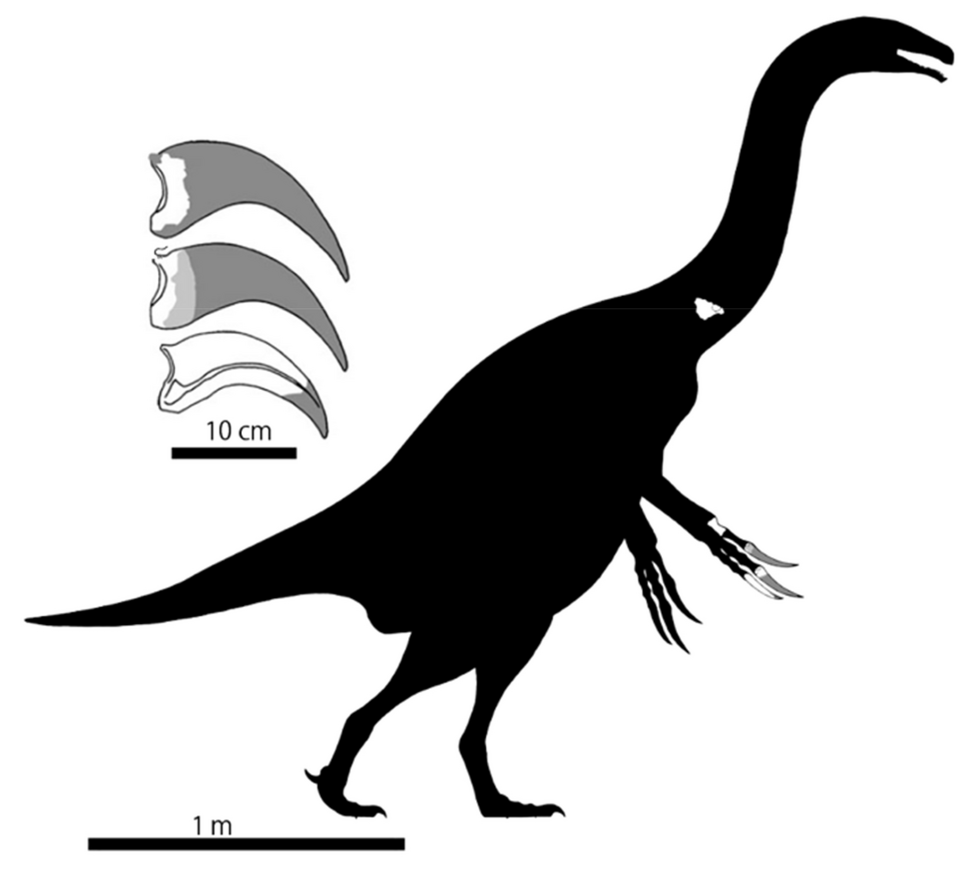
- Known fossil material

Scientific classification
- Kingdom: Animalia
- Phylum: Chordata
- Class: Reptilia
- Clade: Dinosauria
- Clade: Saurischia
- Clade: Theropoda
- Family: †Therizinosauridae
- Genus: †Paralitherizinosaurus; Kobayashi et al., 2022
- Species: †P. japonicus

Binomial name
- †Paralitherizinosaurus japonicus Kobayashi et al., 2022

= Paralitherizinosaurus =

Paralitherizinosaurus Temporal range: Late Cretaceous, Campanian

Genus of therizinosaurid dinosaurs

Paralitherizinosaurus is an extinct genus of therizinosaurid theropod dinosaurs from the Upper Cretaceous Osoushinai Formation of Hokkaido, Japan. The genus contains a single species, Paralitherizinosaurus japonicus, known from a partial right hand and cervical vertebra. Paralitherizinosaurus represents the youngest therizinosaur known from Japan.

== Discovery and naming ==
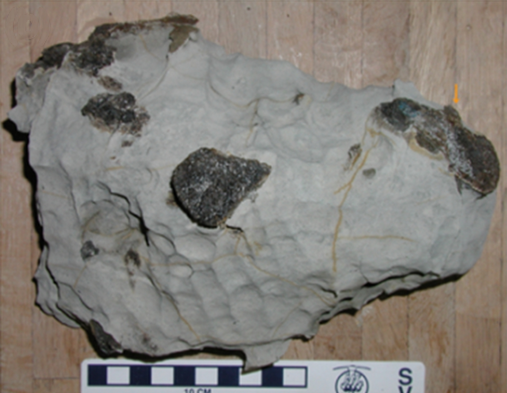
Holotype block

Paralitherizinosaurus type locality at Nakagawa, Hokkaido, Japan

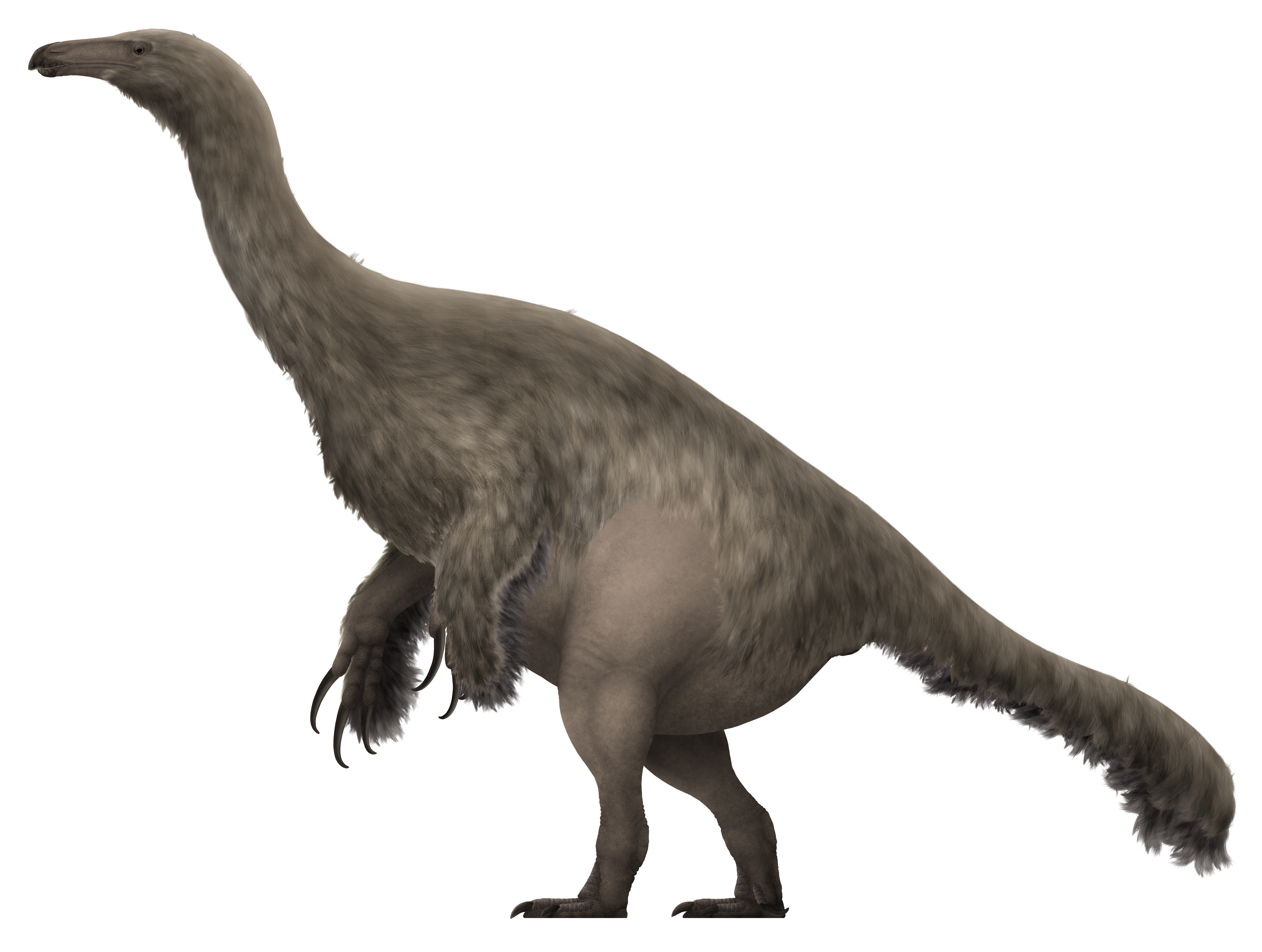
Life restoration

The Paralitherizinosaurus holotype specimen, NMV-52, was discovered in September 2000 in layers of the Osoushinai Formation (Yezo Group) in Nakagawa, Hokkaido, Japan, which dates to the early Campanian age of the late Cretaceous period. The specimen consists of a partial cervical vertebra and the metacarpal I, proximal ends of unguals I and II, and nearly complete ungual III of the right hand.

Some of these remains were first described by Murakami et al. in 2008 as belonging to an indeterminate genus of maniraptoran theropod, possibly with therizinosauroid affinities. In 2022, Kobayashi et al. described Paralitherizinosaurus as a new genus and species of therizinosaurid making it the third therizinosaur found in Japan. This taxon represents the first named therizinosaur from Japan, with two other unnamed specimens being known. The generic name, "Paralitherizinosaurus", combines the Greek words "paralos", meaning "tidal" and "therizo", meaning "scythe", and the Latin "sauros", meaning "lizard". The specific name, "japonicus", refers to the taxon's discovery in Japan.

== Classification ==
Size compared to a human

In their phylogenetic analyses, Kobayashi et al. (2022) recovered Paralitherizinosaurus as a member of an unresolved clade containing Therizinosaurus, Suzhousaurus, and an unnamed therizinosaurid from the Bissekty Formation of Uzbekistan. The cladogram below displays the results of their phylogenetic analyses. Similar results were recovered in an expanded version of this matrix in the 2025 description of Duonychus.

- Therizinosauria
  - Falcarius
  - - Jianchangosaurus
    - - Beipiaosaurus
      - - Lingyuanosaurus
        - - Alxasaurus
          - Therizinosauridae
            - - Erliansaurus
              - Neimongosaurus
            - - Enigmosaurus
              - - - Paralitherizinosaurus
                  - Bissekty therizinosaurid
                  - Therizinosaurus
                  - Suzhousaurus
                - - Nanshiungosaurus
                  - - - Erlikosaurus
                      - Segnosaurus
                    - - Nothronychus mckinleyi
                      - Nothronychus graffami
