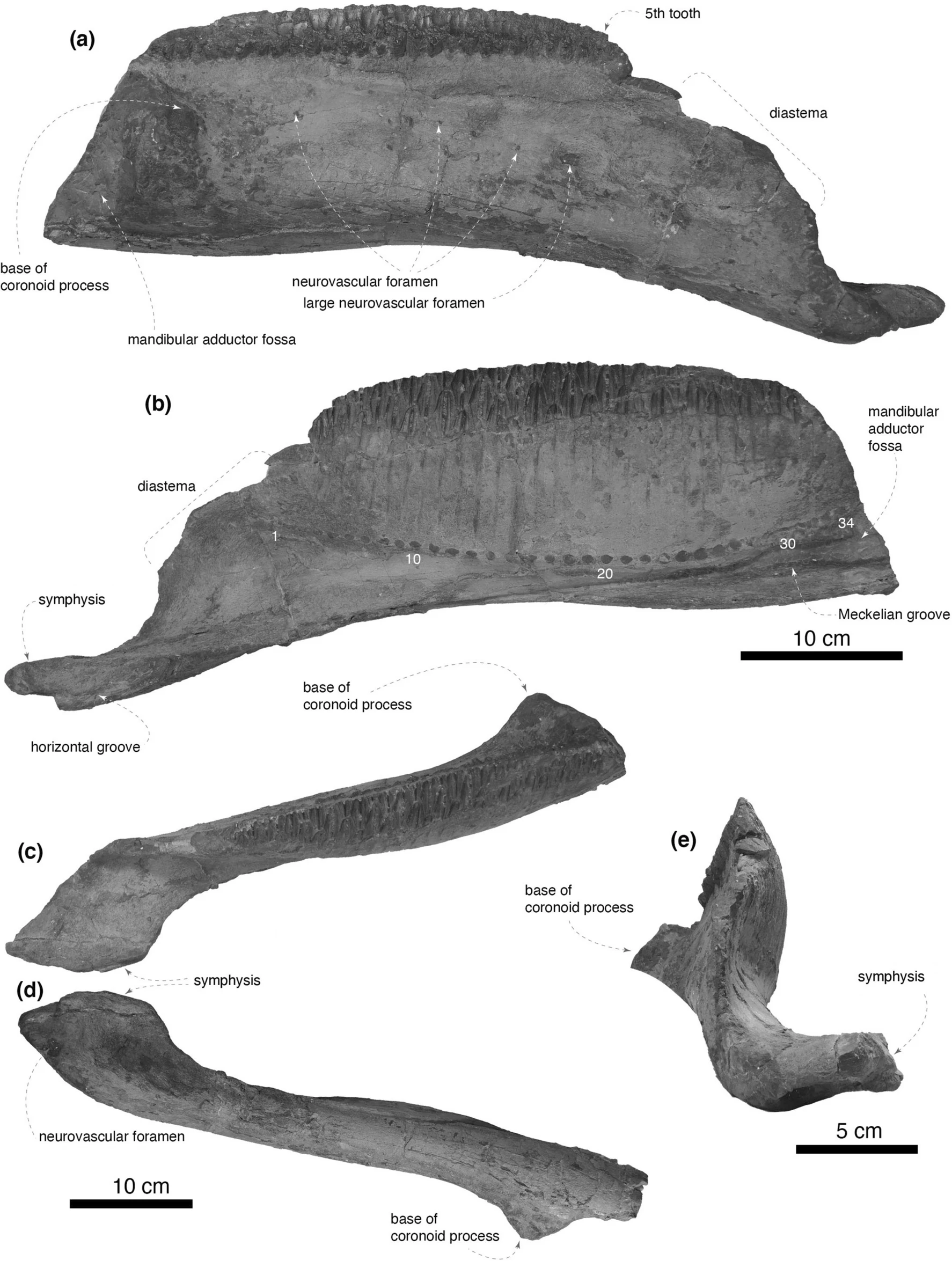
- Holotype dentary seen from four angles

Scientific classification
- Kingdom: Animalia
- Phylum: Chordata
- Class: Reptilia
- Clade: Dinosauria
- Clade: †Ornithischia
- Clade: †Ornithopoda
- Family: †Hadrosauridae
- Genus: †Yamatosaurus; Kobayashi et al. 2021
- Species: †Y. izanagii

Binomial name
- †Yamatosaurus izanagii Kobayashi et al. 2021

= Yamatosaurus =

Yamatosaurus Temporal range: 71.94–71.69 Ma early Maastrichtian

Genus of hadrosaurid

Yamatosaurus (meaning "Yamato reptile") is a genus of basal hadrosaurid from the Late Cretaceous (Maastrichtian)-aged Kita-Ama Formation of Awaji Island, Japan. The genus contains a single species, Yamatosaurus izanagii.

== Discovery and naming ==
The holotype MNHAH D1-033516, consisting of part of the right lower jaw, twelve teeth, four cervical vertebrae, three cervical ribs, a partial right coracoid and a posterior caudal vertebra, was discovered on Awaji Island in Japan in May 2004 by Shingo Kishimoto. In 2005, the find was reported in the scientific literature. Kishimoto in 2013 donated the holotype to Japan's Museum of Nature and Human Activities in the Hyogo Prefecture, where the fossils were prepared by Kazumi Wada, Tomomi Ikeda and Chisato Ota to be described in 2021. The species Yamatosaurus izanagii was named in 2021 by Yoshitsugu Kobayashi, Ryuji Takasaki, Katsuhiro Kubota and Anthony Ricardo Fiorillo. The fossils were found in dark grey mudstones within the upper part Kita-Ama Formation, which was deposited in marine conditions in distal turbidite facies on the edge of the continental slope in an intra-arc basin. The sediments date to subchron 32.1r28, corresponding to the early Maastrichtian stage of the Late Cretaceous, around 71.94–71.69 million years ago, making it roughly contemporaneous with fellow Japanese hadrosaur Kamuysaurus.

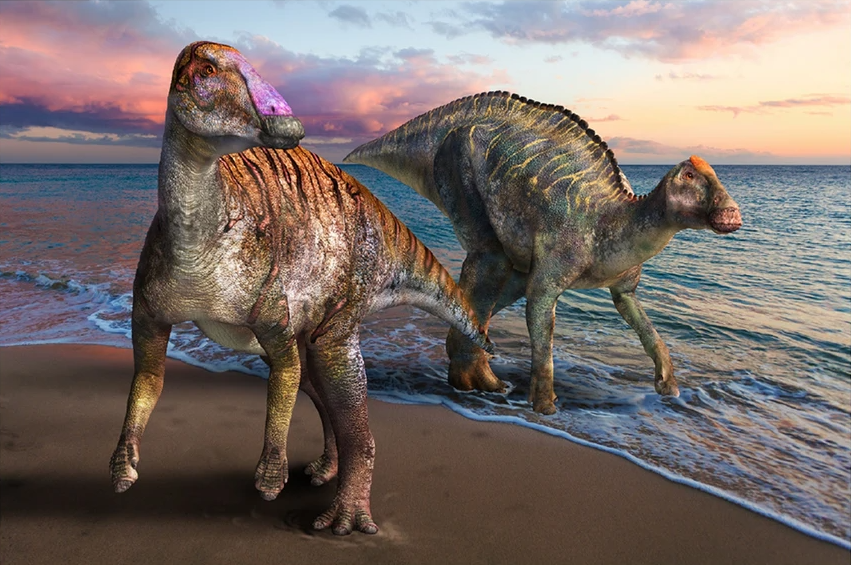
Life restoration of Yamatosaurus (foreground) with the contemporaneous Kamuysaurus (background)

== Etymology ==
The generic name, Yamatosaurus, refers to Yamatai, also known as Yamato, an ancient region in Japan ruled by the Yamato Kingdom, while the specific name, Y. izanagii, refers to the deity Izanagi, who created eight islands in Yamato: Awaji Island (where the holotype was discovered) Shikoku, Oki, Kyushu, Iki, Tsushima, Sado and Honshu.

== Classification ==
Yamatosaurus is a basal hadrosaurid, more derived than Hadrosaurus but less than Saurolophinae+Lambeosaurinae. Its presence, along with those of Plesiohadros and Tanius, suggests East Asia may have served as a refuge for basal hadrosaurs in the Late Cretaceous. However, it was also contemporaneous with the more derived Kamuysaurus, suggesting some level of provinciality.

- Hadrosauridae
  - Hadrosaurus
  - - Yamatosaurus
    - Euhadrosauria
      - Saurolophinae
      - Lambeosaurinae
