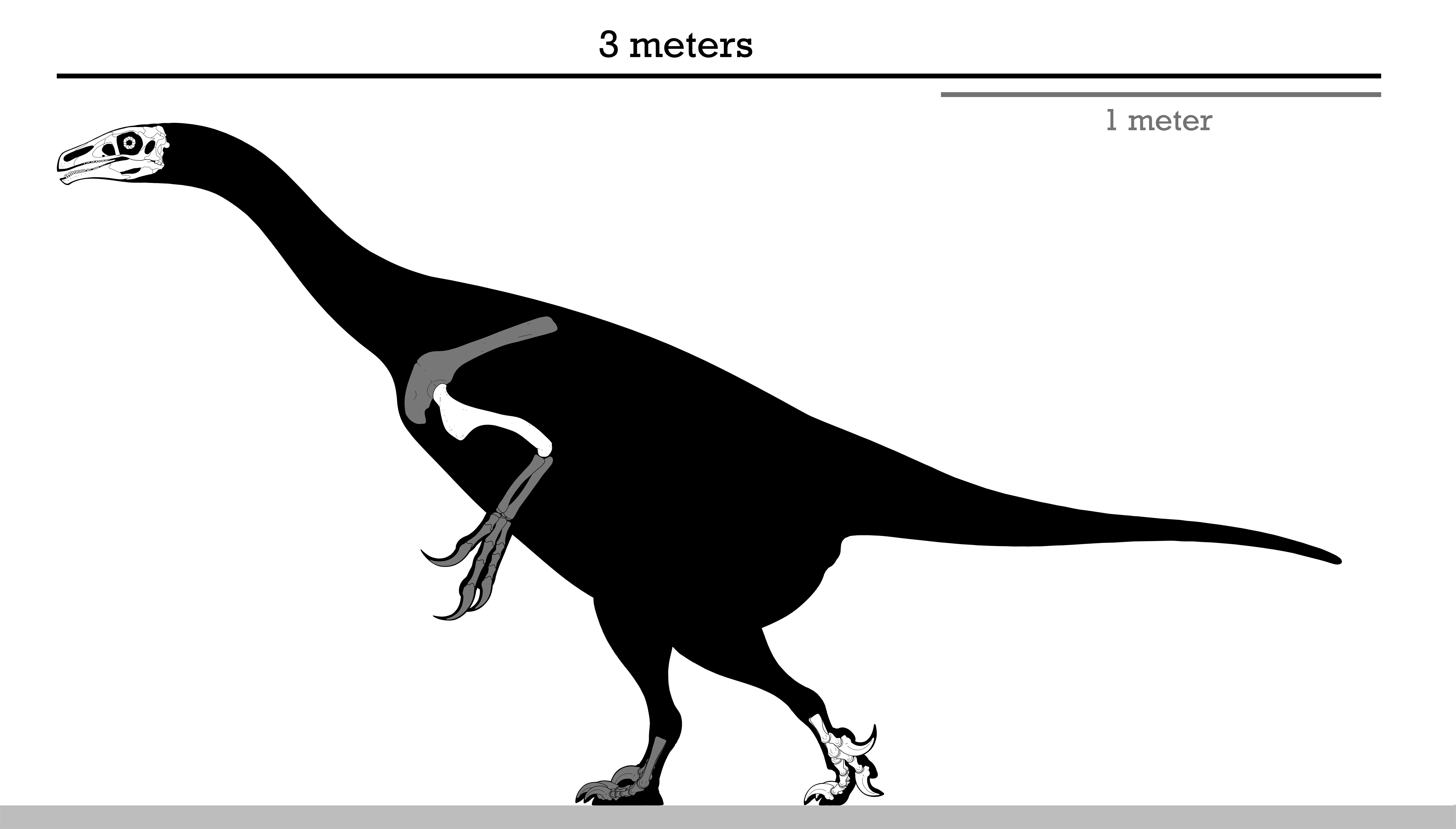
- Skeletal diagram of the holotype

Scientific classification
- Kingdom: Animalia
- Phylum: Chordata
- Class: Reptilia
- Clade: Dinosauria
- Clade: Saurischia
- Clade: Theropoda
- Superfamily: †Therizinosauroidea
- Family: †Therizinosauridae
- Genus: †Erlikosaurus; Barsbold & Perle, 1980

Type species
- †Erlikosaurus andrewsi Barsbold & Perle, 1980

Synonyms
- Erlicosaurus andrewsi Perle, 1981 (lapsus calami)

= Erlikosaurus =

Erlikosaurus Temporal range: Late Cretaceous, ~96–89 Ma

Extinct genus of therizinosaurid dinosaur from the Late Cretaceous

Erlikosaurus (meaning "Erlik's lizard") is a genus of therizinosaurid that lived in Asia during the Late Cretaceous period. The fossils, a skull and some post-cranial fragments, were found in the Bayan Shireh Formation of Mongolia in 1972, dating to around 96 and 89 million years ago. These remains were later described by Altangerel Perle and Rinchen Barsbold in 1980, naming the new genus and species Erlikosaurus andrewsi. It represents the second therizinosaur taxon from this formation (after Segnosaurus), with the most complete skull among members of this peculiar family of dinosaurs.

In contrast to most therizinosaurids, Erlikosaurus was a small member reaching nearly 3.4 m (11 ft) in length and 150 to 250 kg (330 to 550 lb) in mass. It had a well-developed beak at the snout tip and toothed jaws that were used for its herbivorous diet. The feet ended in four toes with the first one articulated to the ankle—in contrast to the vestigial first toe of most theropods. Like other therizinosaurids, Erlikosaurus had a large gut for food processing, strong arms ending in elongated claws, and a backwards directed pelvis.

Erlikosaurus is classified as a therizinosaur within the Therizinosauridae. Therizinosaurs were long-enigmatic dinosaurs with unclear relationships during the early years of research. Subsequent studies proved their true nature as theropod dinosaurs and systematic position among maniraptorans. The beak and jaws of Erlikosaurus indicate a leaf-stripping feeding method characterized by the active use of the beak aided by the neck. Several differences with the sympatric Segnosaurus show that these related genera were niche partitioned.

== Discovery and naming ==
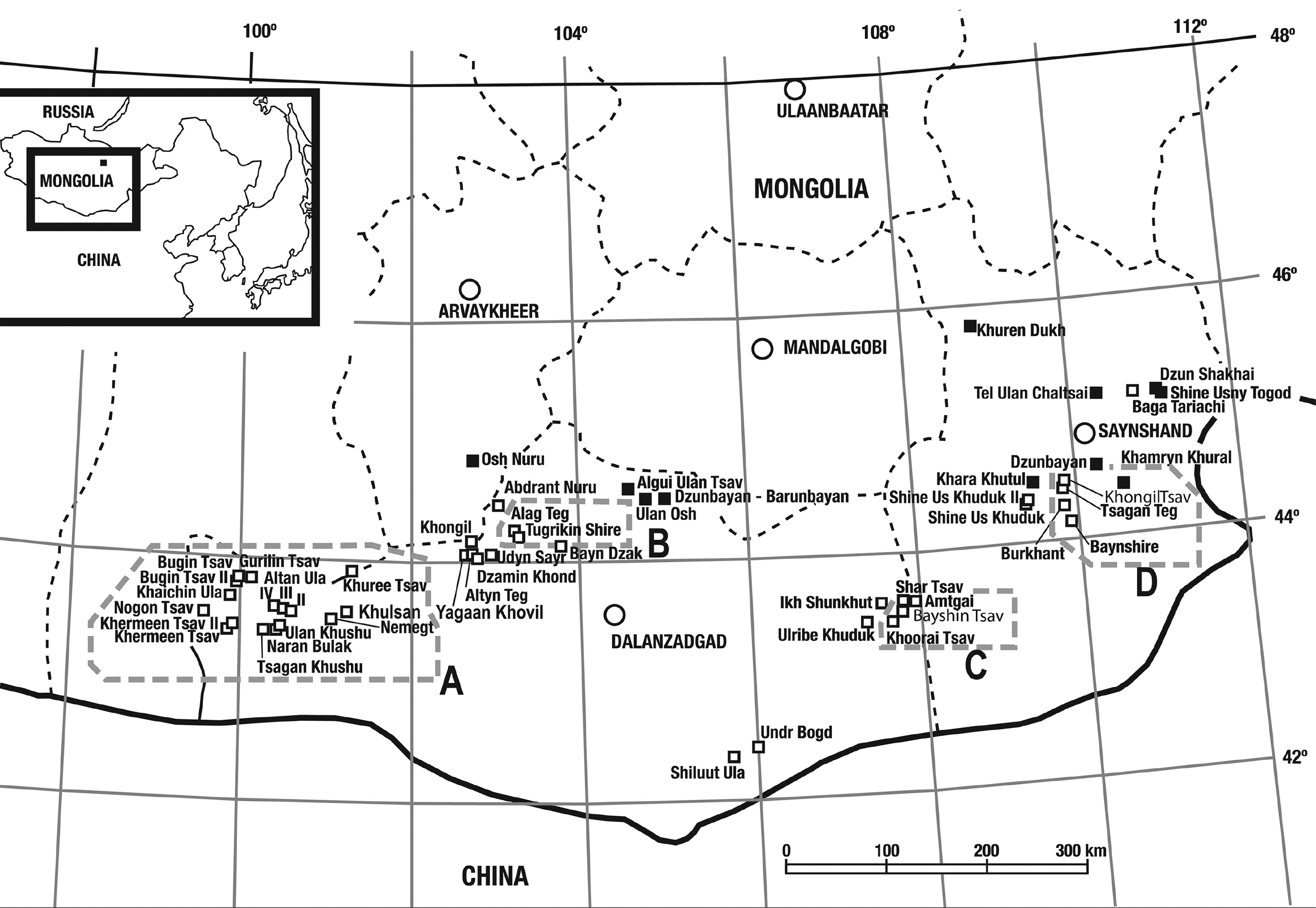
Fossil localities in Mongolia. Locality of Erlikosaurus in Bayshin Tsav, at Area C

The holotype specimen, MPC-D 100/111, was found in layers from the Bayshin Tsav locality on the Bayan Shireh Formation, consisting of an exceptionally well preserved skull, a virtually complete right pes only lacking the proximal end of metatarsals II, III and IV, and an almost complete left humerus. Other remains include some fragmentary cervical vertebrae, however, the count is not specified and they were not illustrated. These findings were made during a Soviet-Mongolian expedition in the Ömnögovi Province in 1972. Eight years later, the genus and type species, Erlikosaurus andrewsi, was named and described (although very briefly) by paleontologists Rinchen Barsbold and Altangerel Perle in 1980, however, Barsbold was not indicated as the name-giver of this particular species. The generic name, Erlikosaurus, was taken from that of the demon king Erlik, from Turko-Mongolian mythology and the Greek σαῦρος (sauros, meaning lizard). The specific name, andrewsi, is in honour to the American paleontologist Roy Chapman Andrews, who was the leader of the American Asiatic Expeditions from 1922 to 1930. Apparently, in the original description a left pes was claimed to be part of the holotype, however, this statement has not been mentioned again.

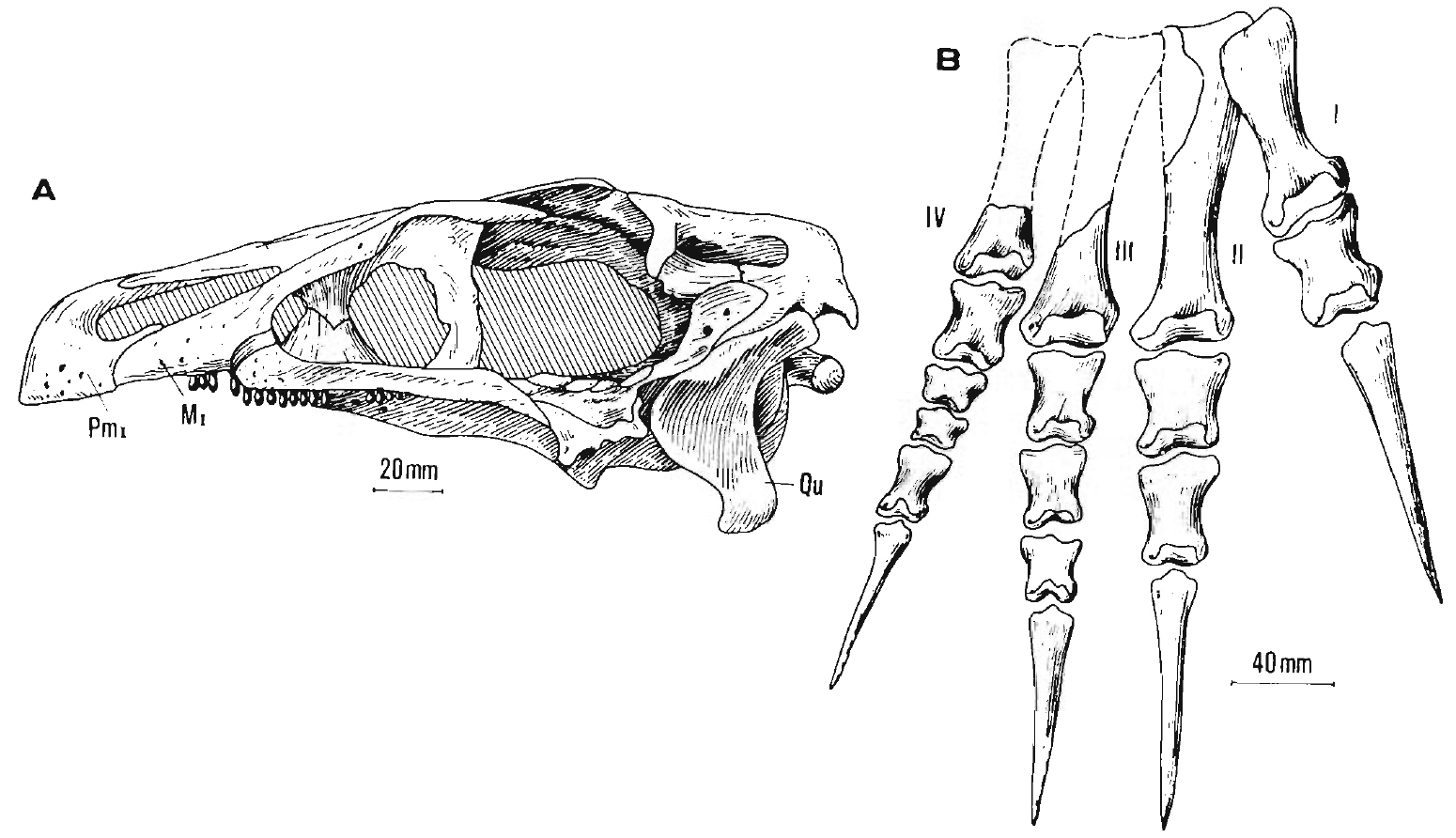
Skull and right pes of the holotype

Confusingly, in 1981 Perle again named and described the species as if it were new, but this time in more detail and spelling the generic name as a Latinised "Erlicosaurus". It is today widely accepted by most authors that the original name, Erlikosaurus, is valid. At the time of its discovery it was the only known therizinosaur (then called segnosaurs) for which a complete skull had been discovered, and this helped shed light on a puzzling and poorly known group of dinosaurs. It still represents the most completely known therizinosaurian skull.

In 2010, Gregory S. Paul challenged the validity of this taxon, arguing that Erlikosaurus may be synonymous with Enigmosaurus (named in 1983), since the remains of the latter were found in the same geologic formation, and only known from pelvic remains, whereas the pelvis in Erlikosaurus is unknown; this would make Enigmosaurus a junior synonym of Erlikosaurus. However, since the holotype hip of Enigmosaurus did not closely resemble that of the specimen in Segnosaurus as would be expected for the Segnosaurus-like remains of Erlikosaurus, and there is a considerable size difference, paleontologist Rinchen Barsbold disputed the alleged synonymy. Additional to this, the remains of Erlikosaurus and Enigmosaurus are known from upper and lower boundary, respectively. Consequently, Enigmosaurus and Erlikosaurus are generally considered separated genera. Additionally, some maniraptoran specimens from the Dinosaur Park Formation of Canada have been referred to as cf. E. andrewsi in the past by Philip J. Currie, but these specimens are most likely indeterminate troodontids.

== Description ==
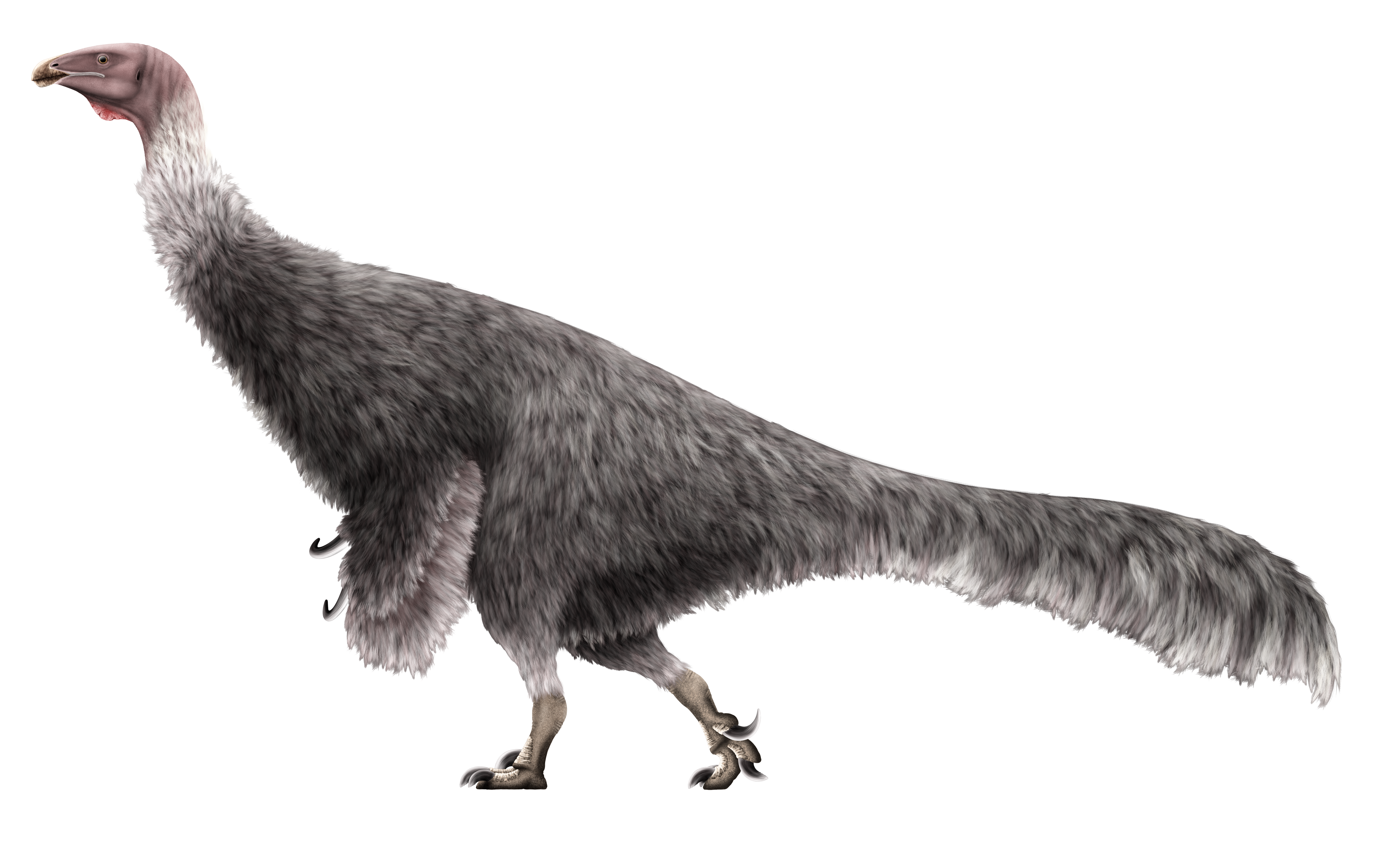
Life restoration

As the genus is only known from very fragmentary material, it has been problematic to determine the size of Erlikosaurus, especially as most of the vertebral column of the holotype is missing. The skull of the holotype specimen length is approximately 25 cm (250 mm) long, indicating a very small individual. Overall, Erlikosaurus was a small-sized therizinosaurid, estimated to have reached about 3.4 m (11 ft), and more lightly built than the ponderous Segnosaurus. In 2012 Stephan Lautenschlager and colleagues used theropod-specific equations to estimate the body mass of Erlikosaurus and other therizinosaurs. However, since the femur is unknown, they used bivariate regression analyses on log-transformed data for Erlikosaurus. The results ended up on a femoral length of 44.33 cm (443.3 mm) and a weight of 173.7 kg (383 lb). Given the uncertainties of these estimates, they established an overall mass range between 150 and 250 kg (330 and 550 lb). Alternative estimations have suggested a maximum length of 6 m (20 ft) long, and a more conservative length of 4.5 metres and a weight of 500 kg (1,100 lb). Though Erlikosaurus largely lacks body remains, as a therizinosaurid it would have had a strong arm build with large claws, a broad and bulky torso, and an opisthopubic (directed backwards) pelvis. It is known that therizinosaurs were feathered animals based on the preserved feather impressions in specimens of Beipiaosaurus and Jianchangosaurus, so it is likely that Erlikosaurus was feathered as well.

=== Skull ===
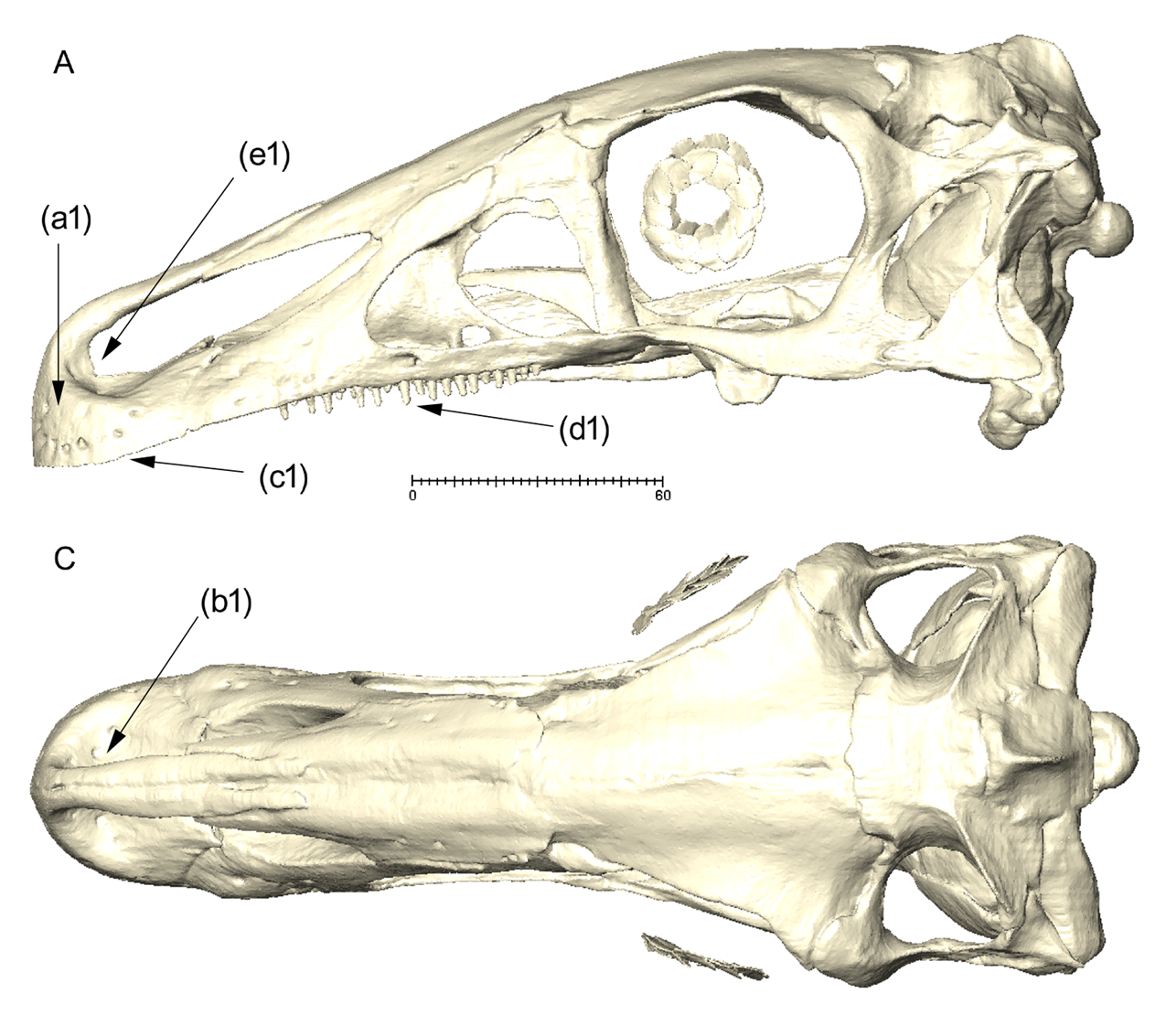
Reconstructed skull of the holotype in lateral (A) and dorsal (C) views

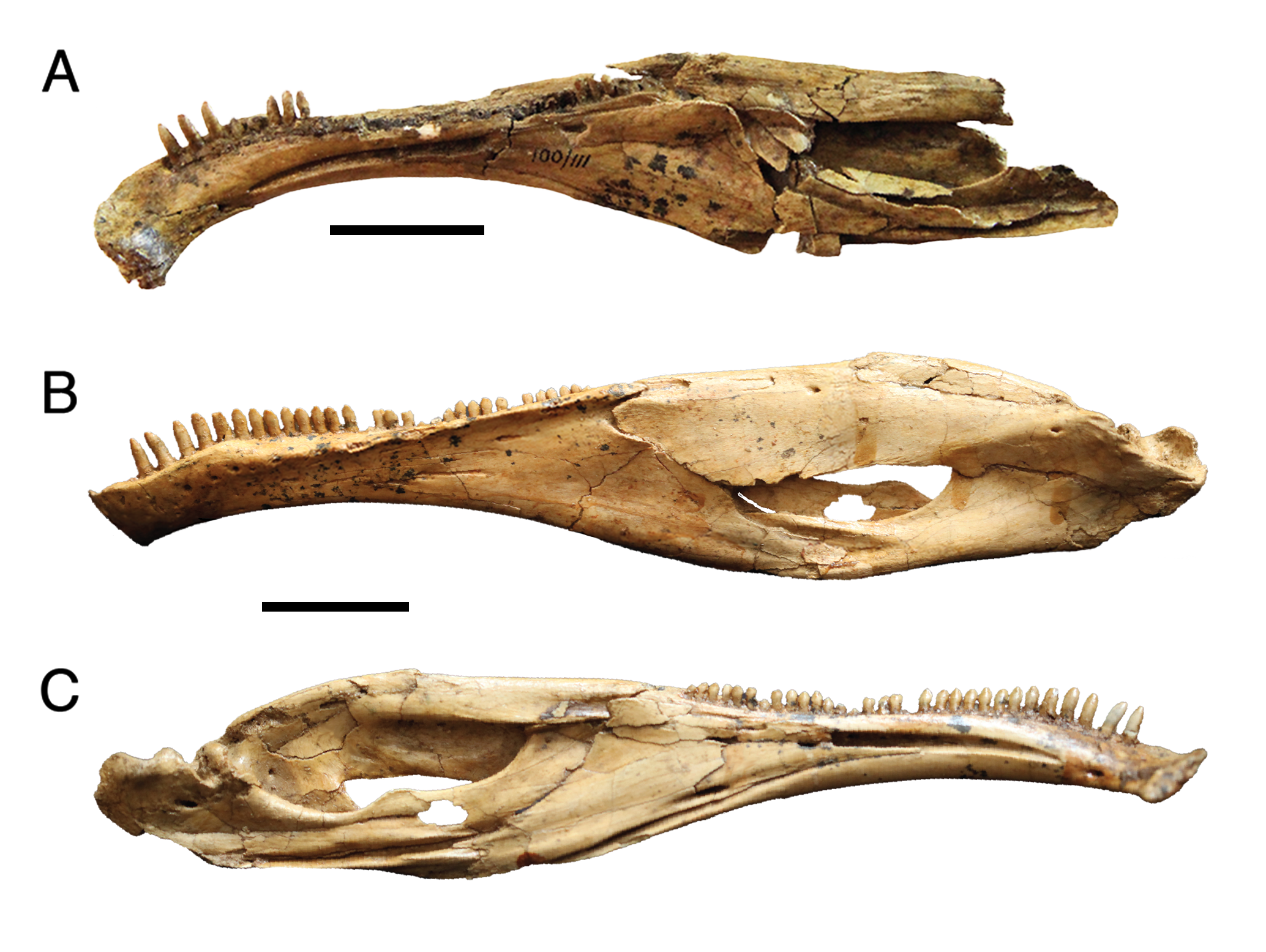
Holotype right (A) and left (B-C) hemimandibles

The snout is moderately elongated, with a premaxilla featuring elongated nasal processes. A fine, vertical lamina of bone is connected rostrally to the medial margin of the premaxilla, indicating that when the animal was alive, a cartilaginous internasal septum was present. Additional to this, the premaxilla features lateral and medial foramina that are connected by a complex system of vascular canals, which pervades the structure of the premaxilla and is probably associated with the sensory branches of the neurovasculature and ophthalmic nerve supporting the rhamphotheca (beak). The maxilla is triangular in shape and preserves 24 alveoli, the teeth are homodont with coarse serrations. The dentary is wedge-shaped elongated and preserves 31 alveoli. In a dorsal view, it is U-shaped and flattened at the back with an expansion lying across. The lateral and ventral surfaces in the symphyseal region bears a series of foramina that measure 2 to 5 mm (0.20 to 0.50 cm) in diameter. Isolated foramina are connected internally by a complex neurovascular canal. When restored, the skull measures 26 cm (260 mm) long and the mandible is about 24 cm (240 mm).

The well preserved braincase is very much complete, only missing the sphenethmoid-mesethmoid complex, whereas the laterosphenoids and orbitosphenoids are incompletely preserved in medial view. The bones around the braincase are strongly coossified, but the sutures between individual elements are not visible superficially, except for a few areas. However, these internal sutures can be traced in CT scans and therefore, braincase elements could be differentiated one from other. The restored brain of the specimen is somewhat elongated. The olfactory apparatus and the cerebral hemispheres are very notorious, with the olfactory tract being far larger than the actual brain. The cerebral hemispheres are large and broad. On the cerebral surface complex vascular grooves can be found, which are typically found in birds and mammals, as well as other dinosaurs. Lastly, the cerebellum is not very notorious as previous elements, it is elongated and stocky.

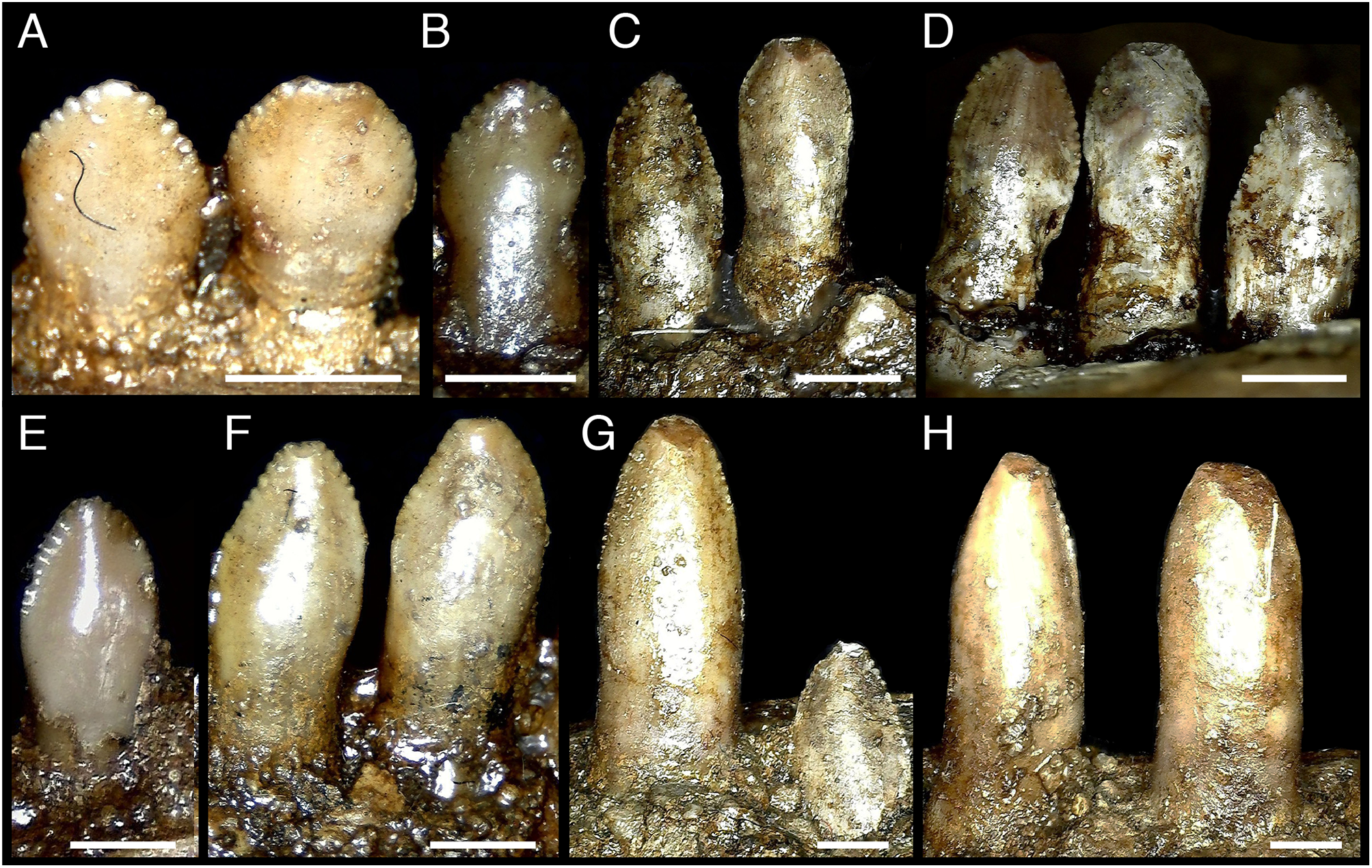
Teeth from the dentary bone

Keratinous beaks, or rhamphothecae, are well documented among diverse groups within the Dinosauria. Ornithomimosaurs have solid evidence for it. However, this is not an indicative to suggest the lack of this anatomical feature in other groups. Several characteristics are indicative of a rhamphothecae, such as an edentulous premaxilla with a thin, tapering lower edge, the successive loss of maxillary and dentary teeth, a mandibular concavity in the lower side, the displacement of the lower surface in the dentary, and a rostral projection of the mandibular symphysis.

In Erlikosaurus, the presence of a keratinous beak on the maxilla and premaxilla can be inferred by the presence of numerous neurovascular foramina on the rostral and lateral surfaces in the skull, furthermore, it bears all the mentioned features above, however, it is unclear the extension of the beak. The preserved rhamphotheca in specimens of Gallimimus and Ornithomimus evidences that the keratin sheath covered the premaxilla and overlapped it on the lower side by a few millimeters. In some extant birds, the rhamphotheca is typically restricted to the premaxilla and maxilla, although in some cases it partially covers the nasal process in some birds. Apparently, in Erlikosaurus the rhamphotheca covered the nasal process of the premaxilla.

=== Postcranial skeleton ===
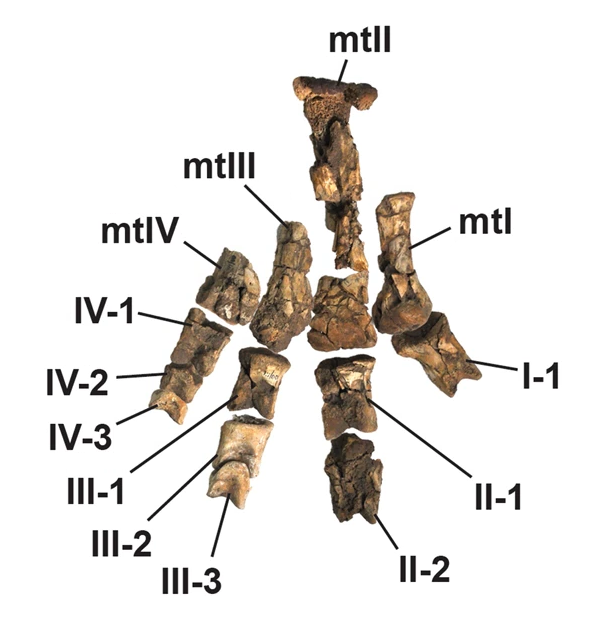
Holotype right foot of Erlikosaurus with unguals removed

Body remains of Erlikosaurus are very sparse compared to the cranial elements, consisting of a humerus, a right foot and some cervical vertebrae. The particular cervicals were not figured and counted but briefly described. The cervicals are platycoelus (slightly concave at both ends) with low neural arches. Being relatively robust, they have thick prezygapophyses and large parapophyses. Additional, the cervicals show some resemblance to those of Segnosaurus, however, being much smaller.

The preserved right pes is virtually complete, only missing the proximal end of the metatarsals II, III and IV. It is shortened in length, with robust metatarsals that bear widened articular extremities, and form a non-compact metatarsus. The metatarsal I is the shortest in comparison, it measures 7 cm (70 mm) long and expands the laterally extended proximal articular surface of the metatarsus. All of the remaining metatarsals, are somewhat equal in size, metatarsal II covers 11 cm (110 mm) in length. The pedal digits are very peculiar in structure; the first digit is reduced in length, with all the remaining digits being nearly equal in length, however the fourth digit is very thin compared to the others. The phalanges of the three first digits are shortened, robust with comparable structure. The second and third phalanx of fourth digit are discoidal and stocky. Lastly, the unguals are recurved, exceptionally large, and strongly flattened laterally. Gregory S. Paul surmised that the long, slender claws of the feet were used for self-defence mechanism.

The left humerus is the only preserved remain from the pectoral region. The humerus shows an elongated epiphyses and a relatively large deltoidal process. It is robust with an estimated length of 30 cm (300 mm). It has a reduced shaft. The proximal end of the humeurs is greatly broad. The humeral head features an articular surface that is convex and broad, in the middle it is reduced toward the margins. A prominent deltopectoral crest is present with the top located 1/3 at the length of the humerus from the proximal end. The articulation condyles for the radius and ulna are differentiated and divided by a shortened, furrow-like fossa and overall, they are very reduced in size. The fossa for the ulnar process is moderately deep and wide. The internal roughness of the head is prominent, as in the unrelated Dromaeosauridae.

== Classification ==
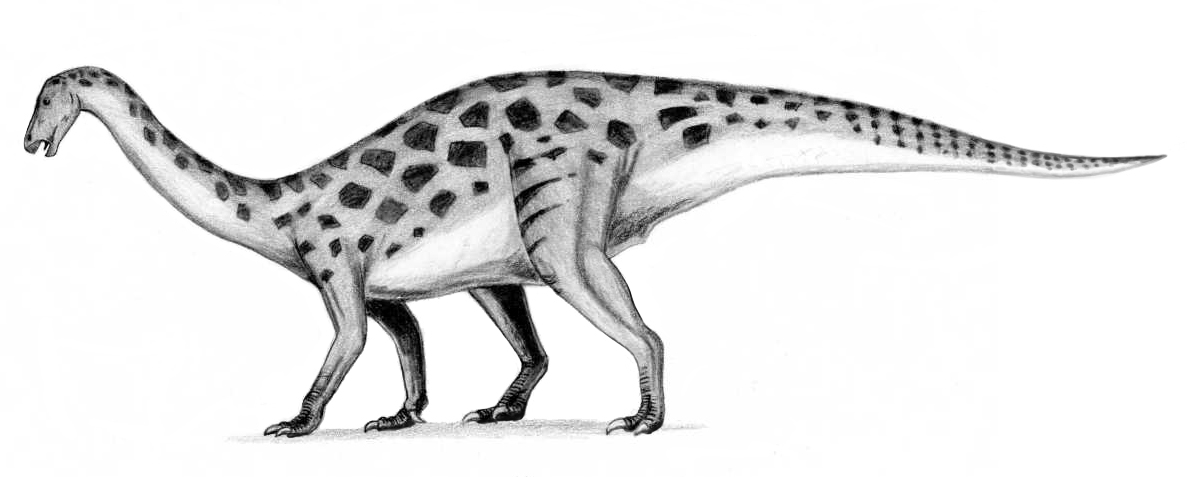
Outdated quadrupedal, prosauropod-like restoration of Erlikosaurus

Erlikosaurus was by Perle assigned to the Segnosauridae, a group today known as the Therizinosauridae, confirmed by later cladistic analyses. Therizinosaurs were a strange group of theropods that ate plants instead of meat, and had a backward-facing pubis, like ornithischians. Also like ornithischians, their jaws were tipped by a broad rounded bony beak useful for cropping off plants.

The relationships of therizinosaurs were quite complicated when the first members were discovered. As an example, the first known therizinosaur taxon, Therizinosaurus, was interpreted to represent turtle-like animals that used the elongated claws to feed on seaweed. However, in 1970, Rozhdestvensky proposed the idea that therizinosaurs (then known as segnosaurs) instead of being non-dinosaur creatures, they were in fact, theropods. Later, in 1980, segnosaurs were thought to be slow, semiaquatic animals, with this, Gregory S. Paul claimed that these controversial animals had no theropod characteristics and they were prosauropods with ornithischian adaptations, also, they shared evolutionary relationships. However, with the description of more genera such as Alxasaurus, Nanshiungosaurus, and the redescription of the skull of Erlikosaurus, more theropod evidence began to be supported. With the discovery and description of the feathered Beipiaosaurus, therizinosaurs were utterly recognized as theropods, and started to be reconstructed in an accurate, bipedal posture.

Consequently, therizinosaurs are now classified as theropods, within the Coelurosauria. Lindsay Zanno was one of the first authors to examine in detail the relationships and affinites of therizinosaurs. Her work has been useful in many phylogenetic analyses. The cladogram below is the result of the phylogenetic analysis performed by Hartman et al. 2019 using the data provided by Zanno in 2010. Erlikosaurus occupied a very derived position in a clade with the two Nothronychus species:

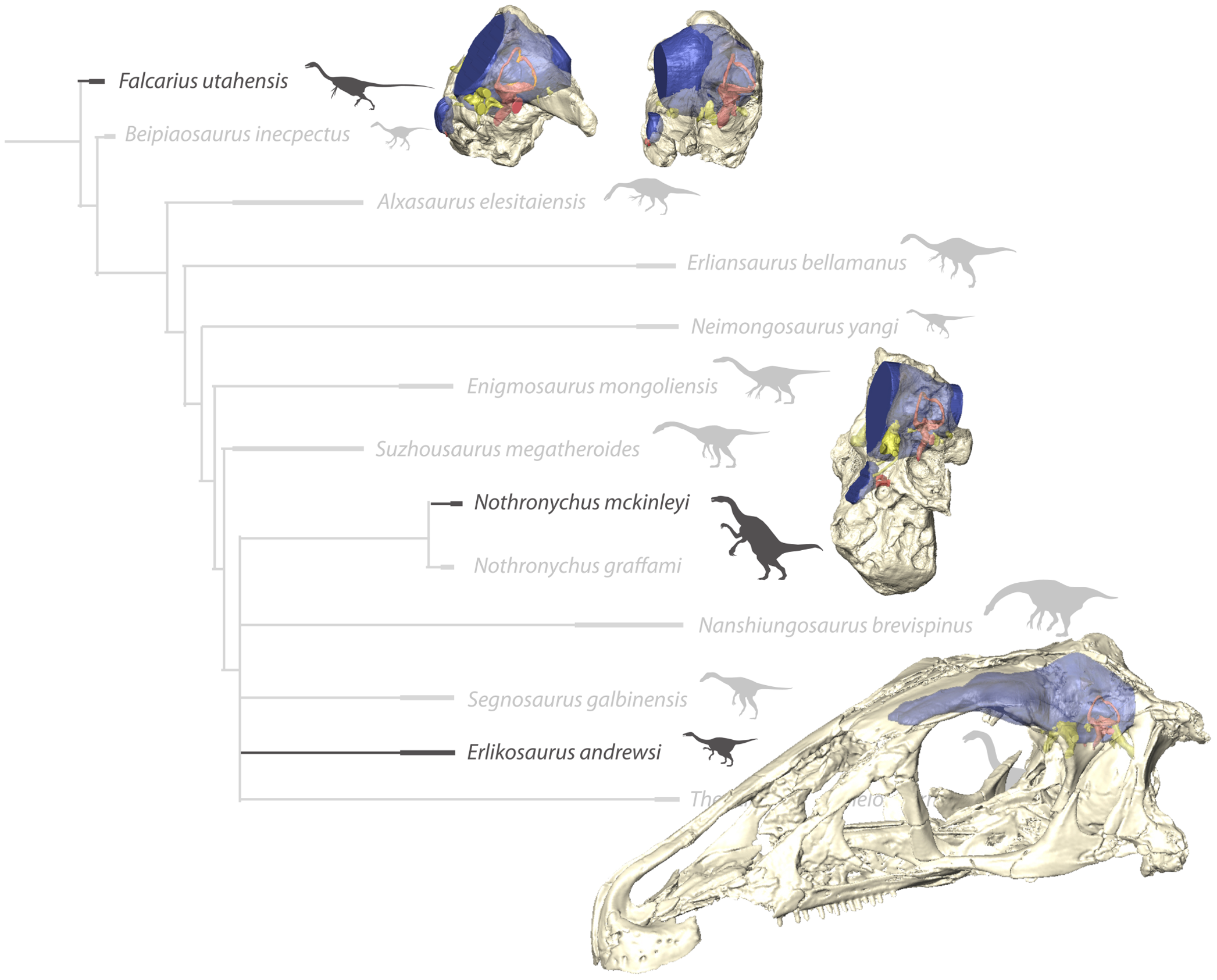
Holotype skull of Erlikosaurus (below) and endocranial elements of other therizinosaurs

- Therizinosauridae
  - unnamed
    - Suzhousaurus
    - unnamed
      - Neimongosaurus
      - unnamed
        - Therizinosaurus
        - Erliansaurus
  - unnamed
    - Nanchao embryos
    - unnamed
      - Nanshiungosaurus
      - unnamed
        - unnamed
          - Segnosaurus
          - AMNH 6368
        - unnamed
          - Erlikosaurus
          - unnamed
            Nothronychus graffami
          - Nothronychus mckinleyi

== Paleobiology ==
=== Senses ===
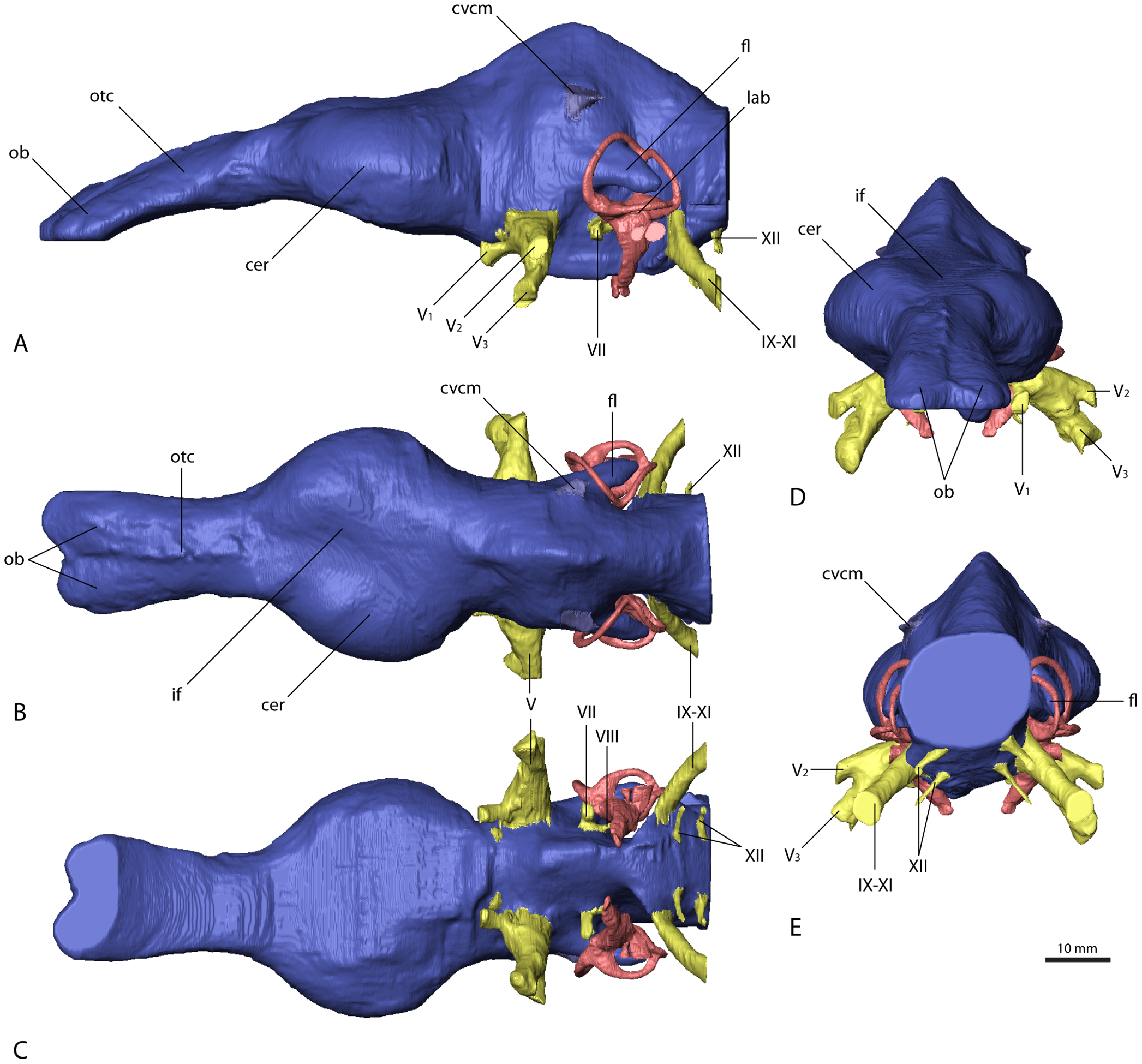
Reconstructed brain of Erlikosaurus

Erlikosaurus is poorly known from postcranial material, but the holotype skull became the focus of study in Computed Tomography (CT) scans that were published back in 2012 by the paleontologist Stephan Lautenschlager and Dr Emily Rayfield of Bristol University School of Earth Sciences, Professor Lindsay Zanno of the North Carolina Museum of Natural History and North Carolina State University, and Lawrence Witmer, Chang Professor of Paleontology at the Ohio University Heritage College of Osteopathic Medicine. Analysis of the brain cavity revealed that Erlikosaurus, and quite likely most other therizinosaurids, had well developed senses of smell, hearing, and balance, traits better associated with carnivorous theropods. The enlarged forebrain of Erlikosaurus may also have been useful in complex social behavior and predator evasion. These senses were also well-developed in earlier coelurosaurs and other theropods, indicating that therizinosaurs may have inherited many of these traits from their carnivorous ancestors and used them for their different and specialized dietary purposes.

In 2019, Graham M. Hughes and John A. Finarelli analyzed the olfactory bulb ratio in modern birds and preserved skulls of several extinct dinosaur species to predict how many genes would have been involved in the olfactory strength of these extinct species. Their analysis found that Erlikosaurus had about 477 genes encoding its olfactory receptors and an olfactory bulb ratio of 40, indicating moderate senses of smell. The scores of Erlikosaurus were higher than most dromaeosaurids despite the herbivorous life-style in this taxon, and may reflect a transition to complex sociality and/or reduced visual capacities. Hughes and Finarelli pointed out that as dinosaurian lineages became larger, the size of the olfactory bulb increased, which may suggest olfaction as the main sensory modality in large-bodied non-avian dinosaurs.

=== Feeding and bite force ===
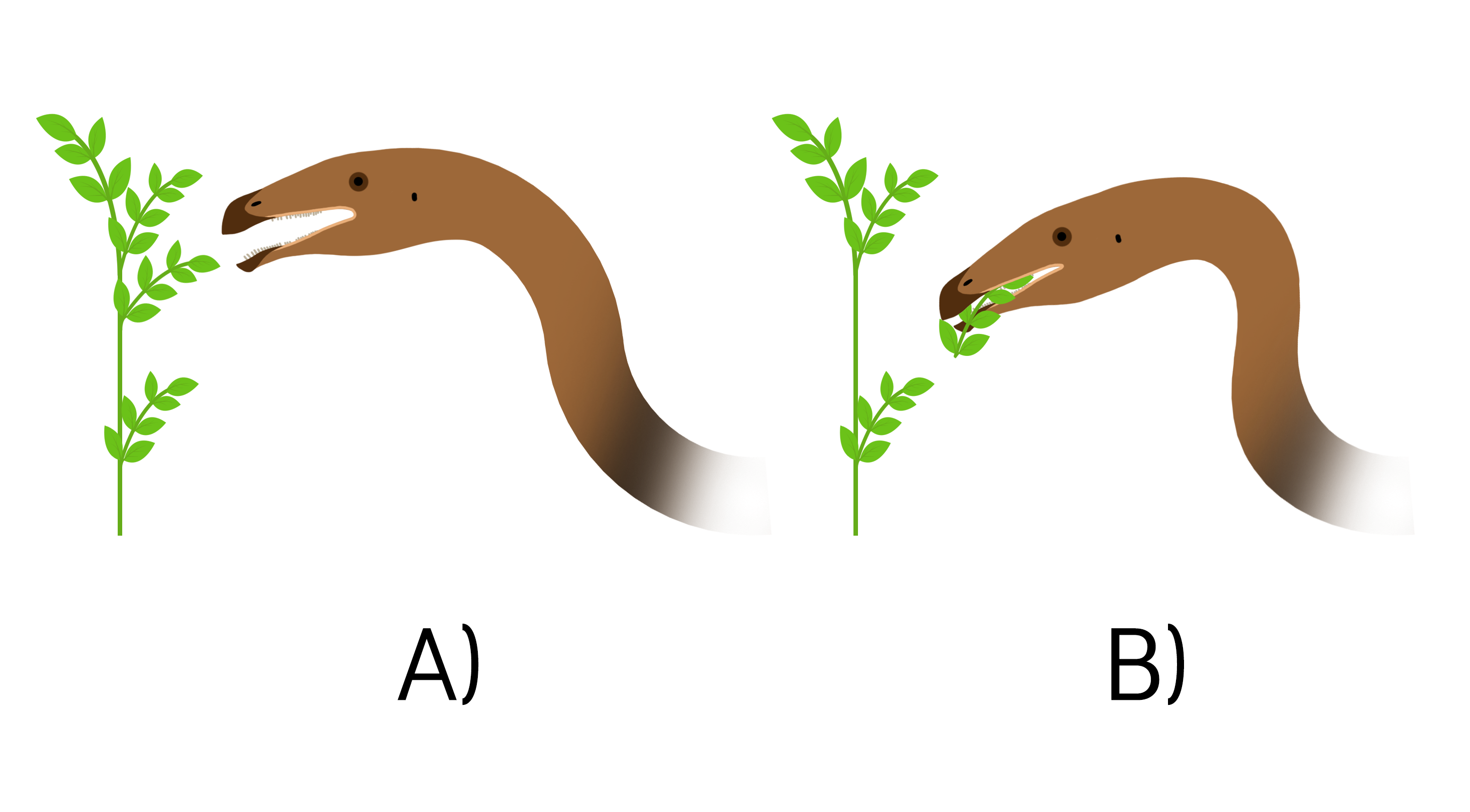
Proposed feeding method by Lautenschlager: Erlikosaurus reaches vegetation (A) and then rips it off with its beak (B)

In 2013, Lautenschlager performed digital reconstructions for the cranial musculature in Erlikosaurus and found a relatively weak bite force compared to other theropods. As a whole, the adductor musculature of the jaws—which primarily function to close the jaws—generates a total force of 374 and 570 N but only a small portion is actually used when biting because the bite force starts to decline as the more the distance of the bite point is to the jaw joint. Lautenschlager found the lowest force at the snout tip with 43–65 N, and the highest at the last maxillar tooth region, with 90–134 N. Factors like the presence of a large gut to process vegetation and the lack of damage patterns on the teeth suggest that Erlikosaurus used only the tip of the snout and the premaxillary region to reach for soft foliage or fruits, and the lesser bite force for Erlikosaurus better served in leaf-stripping and plant-cropping feeding mechanism, rather than active mastication. In this study, Lautenschlager also suggested that Erlikosaurus may have been able to process mainly thin branches and plant matter based on Stegosaurus. Moreover, the comparably narrow width of the snout could indicate selective feeding in this therizinosaurid. Lastly, the branch‐stripping behaviour of Erlikosaurus may have been compensated by the postcranial musculature. During the same year, Lautenschlager and team made digital models of the skull of Erlikosaurus to test the function the rhamphotheca (keratinous beak), finding that this structure in the jaws acted as a stress-mitigating structure. They concluded that keratinous beaks are beneficial to enhance the stability of the skull making it less susceptible to bending and/or deformation during feeding.

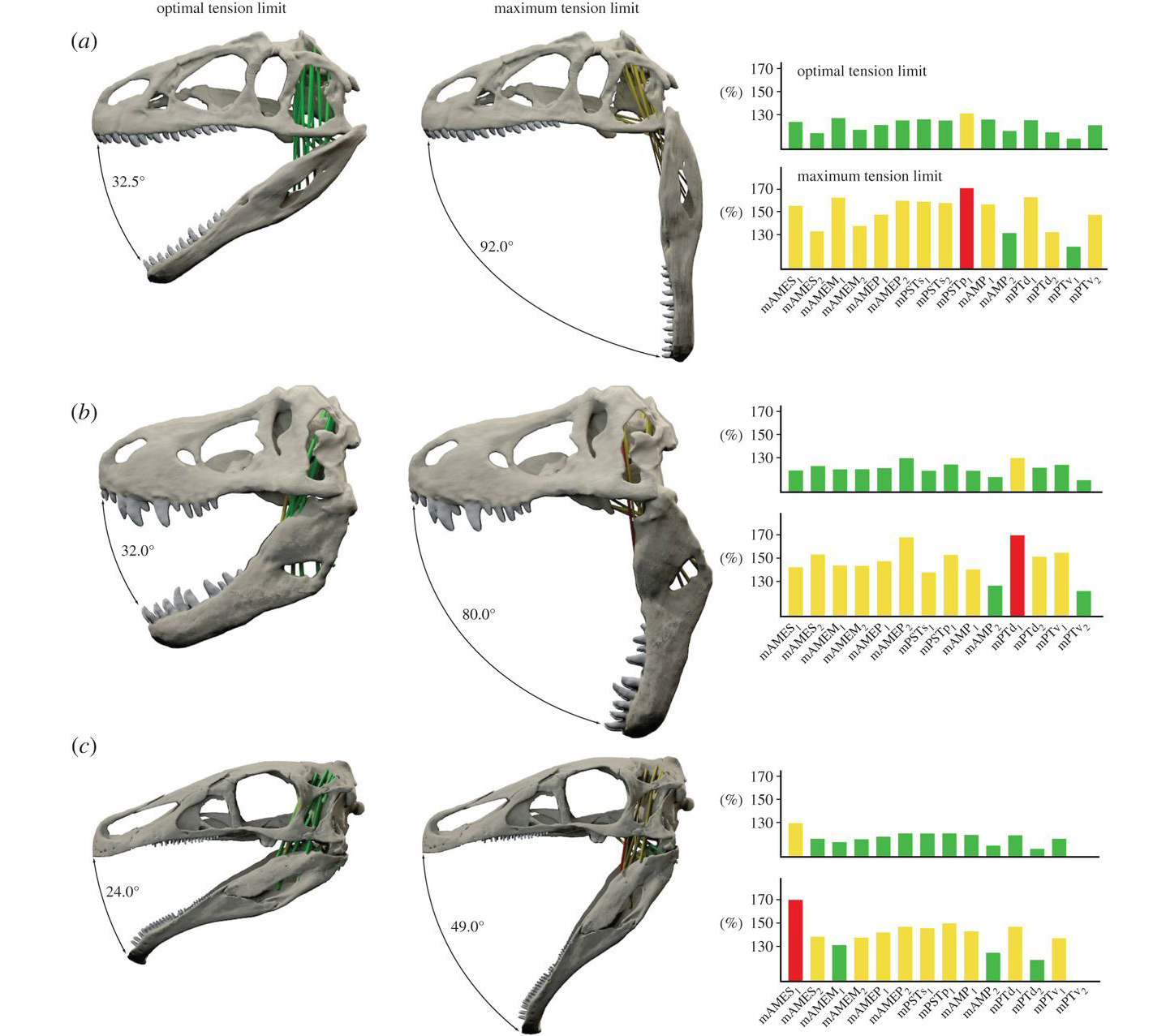
Optimal and maximum jaw gapes of Allosaurus (A), Tyrannosaurus (B) and Erlikosaurus (C)

The well preserved jaws also allowed a study by the University of Bristol to determine how its feeding style and dietary preferences were linked to how wide they could open the mouth. In the study, performed by Lautenshlager and colleagues in 2015, it was revealed that Erlikosaurus could open its mouth to a 43 degree angle at maximum. Also included in the study for comparison were the carnivorous theropods Allosaurus and Tyrannosaurus. From the comparisons, it was indicated that carnivorous dinosaurs had wider jaw gapes than herbivores, much as modern carnivorous animals do today.

In 2016, using Finite Element Analysis (FEA) and a Multibody Dynamics Analysis (MDA), the bite forces of Erlikosaurus, Plateosaurus and Stegosaurus were tested in order to estimate dietary habits. The resulting bite force for Erlikosaurus was between 50 and 121 N, with a skull characterised by high susceptibility to stress and deformation that indicates a feeding behaviour specialized in the active use of the beak. The results further support that Erlikosaurus relied on postcranial musculature to compensate the low bite force and to relieve stresses on cranial structure.

== Paleoenvironment ==
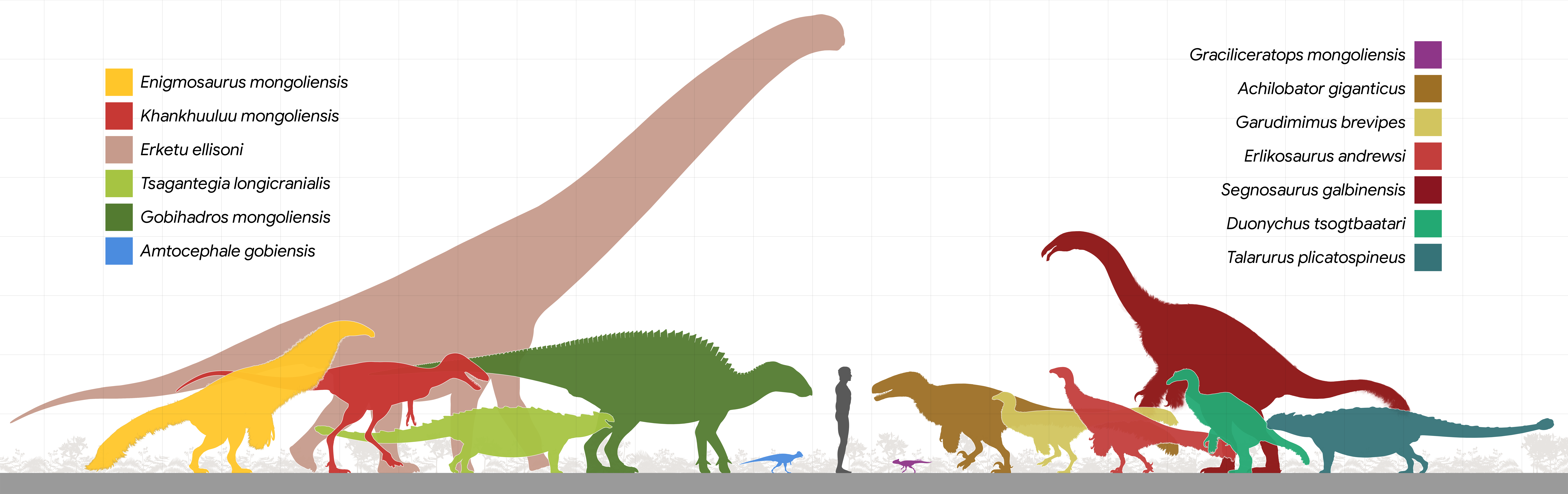
Erlikosaurus compared to the known Dinosauria of the Bayan Shireh Formation (Erlikosaurus in red, fourth from right)

The holotype of Erlikosaurus was unearthed from the Bayshin Tsav locality at the upper boundary of the Bayan Shireh Formation, in a quarry composed of gray sands with conglomerates, gravels, and gray claystones. Bayshi Tsav is thought to have been deposited by meandering rivers. The examination of the magnetostratigraphy of the formation seems to confirm that the entire Bayan Shireh lies within the Cretaceous Long Normal, which lasted only until the end of the Santonian stage. Moreover, calcite U–Pb measurements estimate the age of the Bayan Shireh Formation from 95.9 ± 6.0 million to 89.6 ± 4.0 million years ago, Cenomanian through Santonian ages.

Fluvial, lacustrine and caliche-based sedimentation indicates a lesser semi-arid climate, with the presence of wet environments composed of large meanders and lakes. Largescale cross-stratification in many of the sandstone layers at the Bayn Shireh and Burkhant localities seems to indicate large meandering rivers, and these large water bodies may have drained the eastern part of the Gobi Desert. Numerous fossilized fruits have been recovered from the Bor Guvé and Khara Khutul localities. A vast diversity of fauna is known in the formation, compromising dinosaur and non-dinosaur genera. Fellow theropods include the tyrannosauroid Khankhuuluu, the large dromaeosaurid Achillobator, and the deinocheirid Garudimimus. Other herbivorous dinosaurs are represented by the ankylosaurs Talarurus and Tsagantegia, small marginocephalians Amtocephale and Graciliceratops, the hadrosauroid Gobihadros, and the sauropod Erketu. Other fauna include semiaquatic reptiles like crocodylomorphs and nanhsiungchelyid turtles.

=== Coexistence with Segnosaurus ===
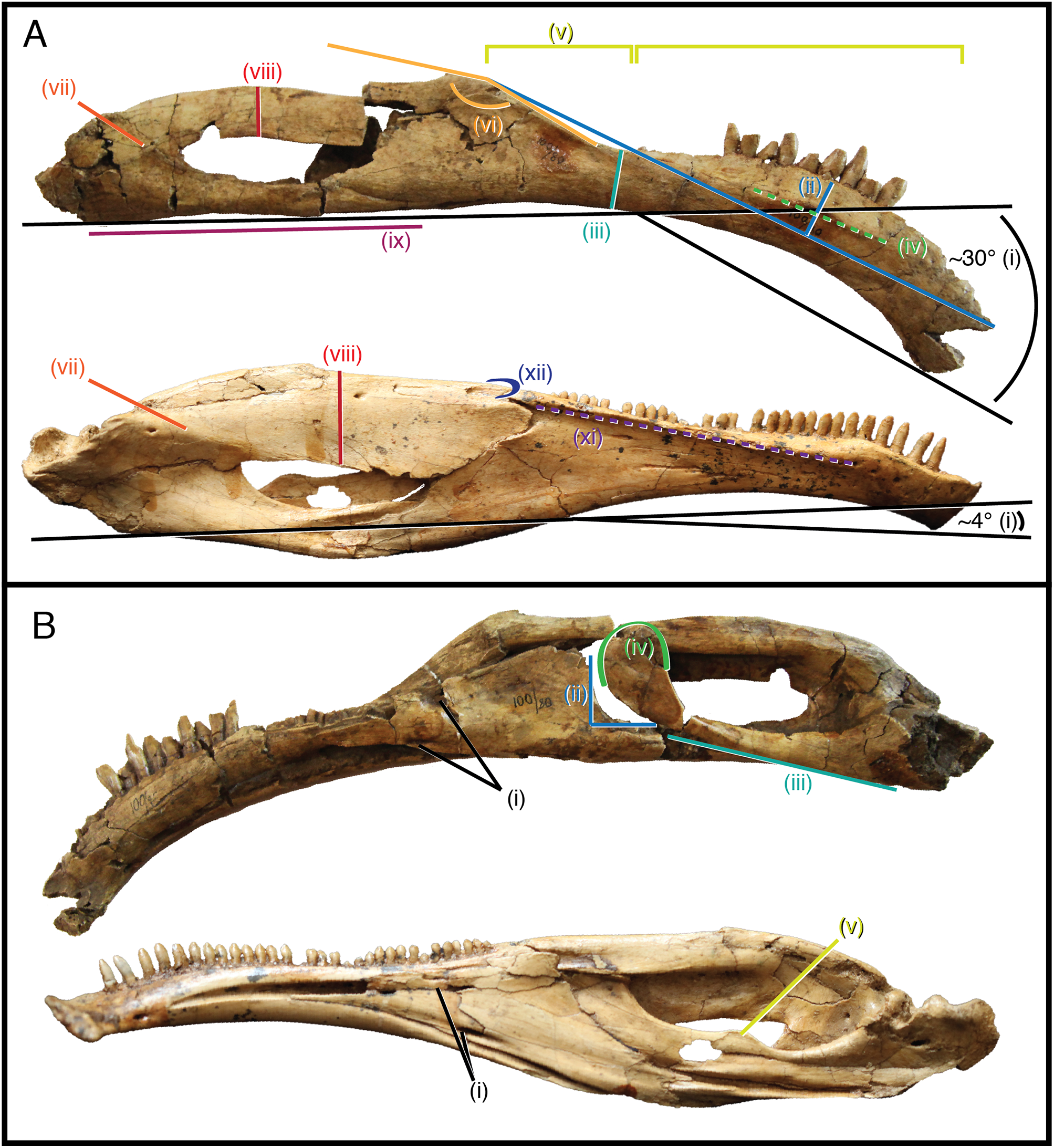
Lower jaw of Erlikosaurus (bottom) and Segnosaurus (top)

Erlikosaurus lived alongside a larger species of therizinosaurid in the Bayan Shireh Formation, Segnosaurus. In 2016, Zanno and colleagues re-examined the lower jaws and dentition of Segnosaurus making direct comparisons with those of Erlikosaurus in the process. They identified rather complex features in the dentary teeth of Segnosaurus, which are represented by the presence of numerous carinae (cutting edges) and folded carinae with denticulated front edges, and the enlargement of denticles (serrations). These traits together create a roughened, shredding surface near the base of the tooth crowns that was unique to Segnosaurus and suggest it consumed unique food resources or used highly specialized feeding strategies, with the addition of a higher degree of oral food processing than the sympatric—related species that lived in the same area at the same time—Erlikosaurus. On the contrary, the latter has very symmetrical teeth with moderate denticles. The respective indistinct and specialized dentition of Erlikosaurus and Segnosaurus indicates that these two therizinosaurids were separated by niche differentiation in food acquisition, processing, or resources. This conclusion is strengthened by the large difference in estimated body masses, which is up to 500%.

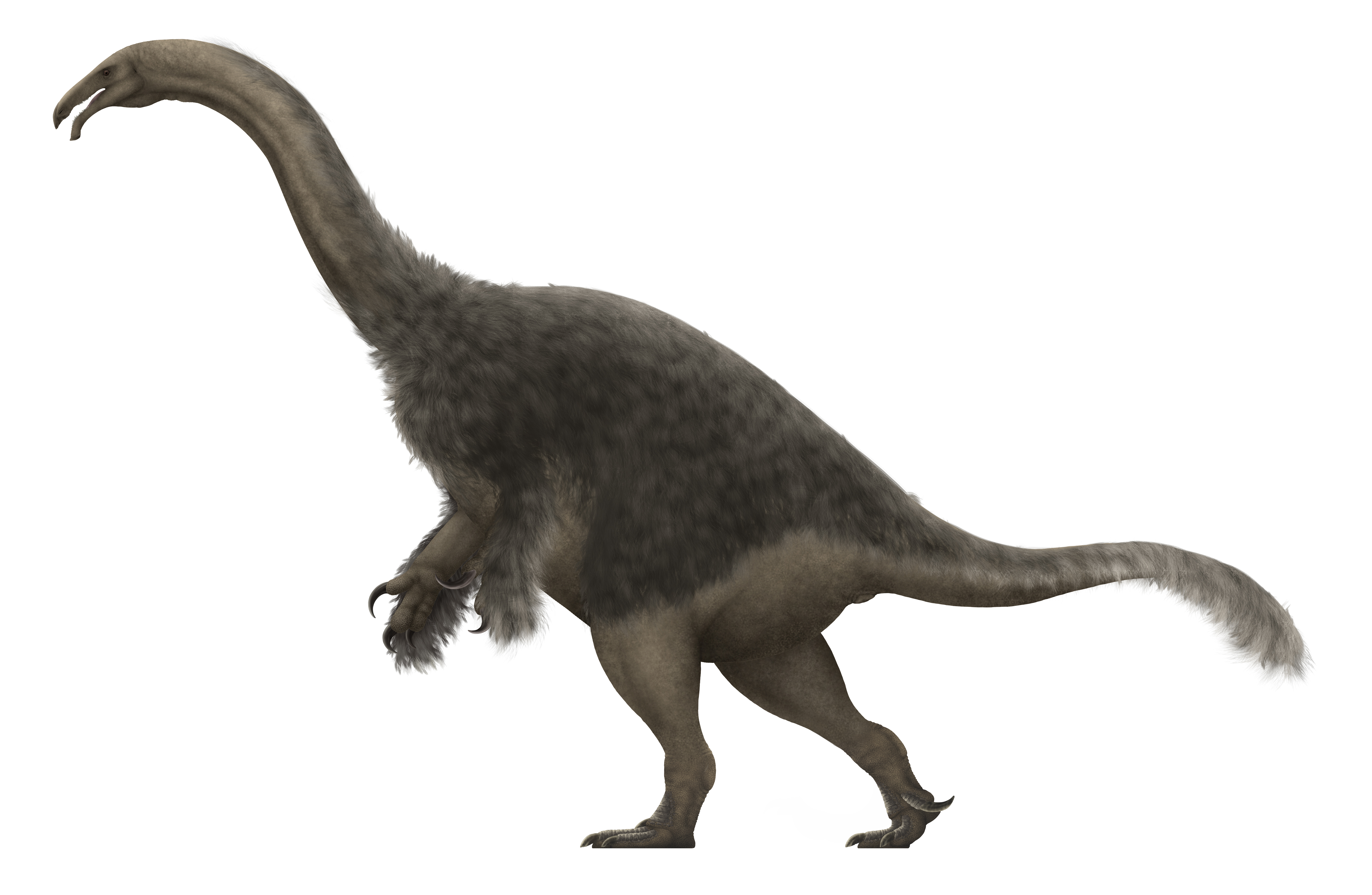
Life restoration of the larger and sympatric Segnosaurus

In a 2017 study of niche partitioning in therizinosaurs through digital simulations, Lautenschlager found the straighter and more elongated dentaries of primitive therizinosaurs had the highest magnitudes of stress and strain during extrinsic feeding scenarios. In contrast, Erlikosaurus and Segnosaurus were aided by the down-turned tip of the lower jaws and symphyseal (bone union) regions, and probably also by stress and strain-mitigating beaks. The results also showed a difference in bite forces between Segnosaurus and Erlikosaurus, indicating the former would have been able to feed on tougher vegetation, while the overall robustness of the latter suggests greater flexibility in its manner of feeding. Lautenschlager pointed out the two taxa were adapted to different modes food acquisition, and that the difference in size and heights between the two therizinosaurids further separated their niches. While Segnosaurus was adapted to use its specialized dentition to procure or process food, Erlikosaurus mostly relied on its beak and neck musculature for cropping while foraging.

In addition to these cranial differences, in 2019 Button and Zanno note that herbivorous dinosaurs followed two main distinct modes of feeding. One of these was processing food in the gut which is characterized by gracile skulls and relatively low bite forces, and the second was oral food processing, characterized by features associated with extensive processing such as the lower jaws or dentition. Segnosaurus was found to be in the former mode, whereas Erlikosaurus was more likely to fall in the second group, further supporting that these two therizinosaurids were separated by a well-defined niche differentiation.

== See also ==
- Timeline of therizinosaur research
