= Hokkaido University Museum =

- 北海道大学総合博物館
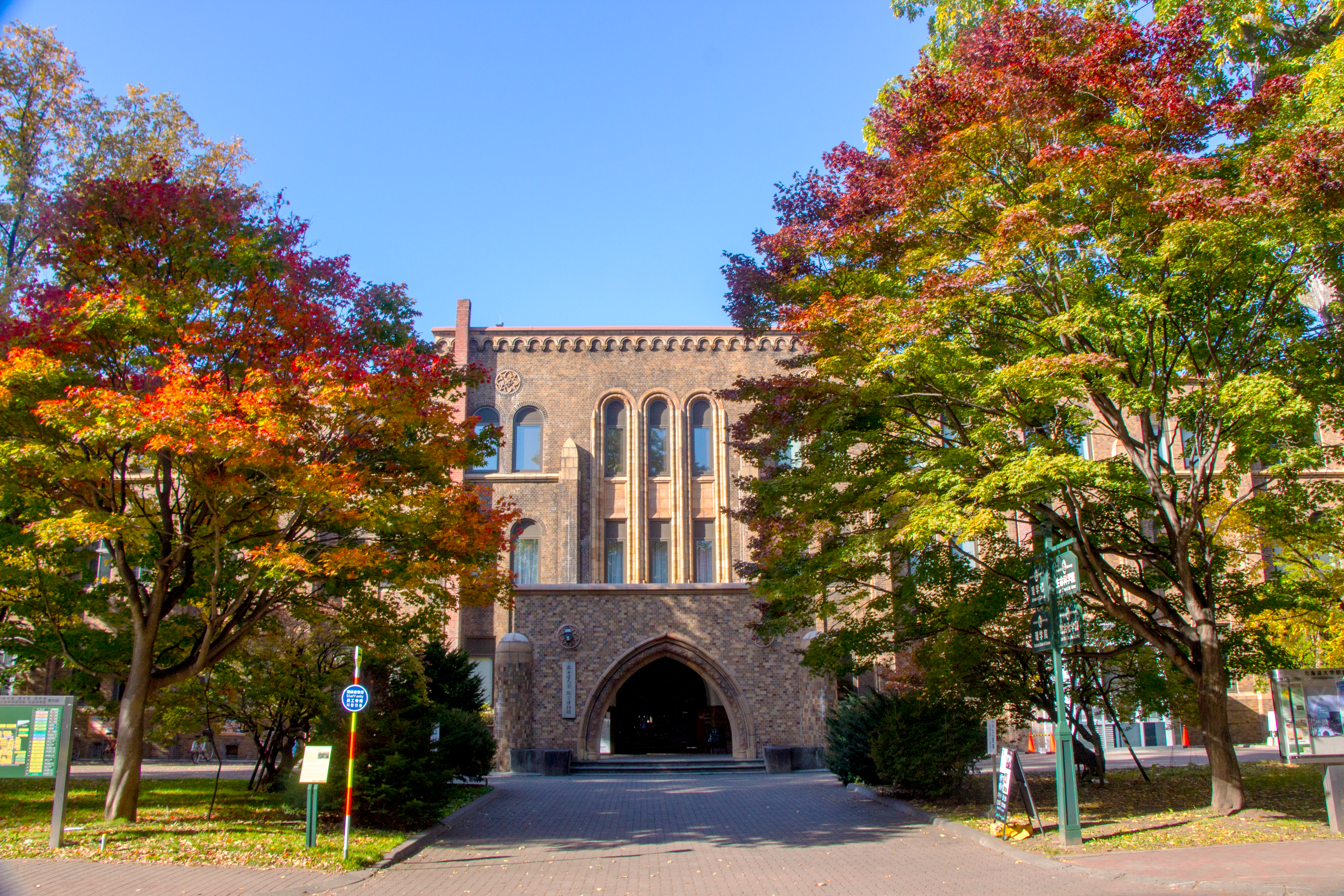
- Interactive map of the Hokkaido University Museum area

General information
- Location: Kita 10, Nishi 8, Kita-ku, Sapporo, Hokkaidō, Japan
- Coordinates: 43°03′37″N 141°19′50″E
- Opened: Spring 1999

Website
- Official website

The Hokkaido University Museum (北海道大学総合博物館, Hokkaidō Daigaku Sōgō Hakubutsukan) opened in Sapporo, Hokkaidō, Japan in 1999. The collection comprises some four million materials, including thirteen thousand type specimens, amassed by Hokkaido University in the hundred and fifty years since the foundation in of its predecessor, the Sapporo Agricultural College, in 1876.

== See also ==
- List of Cultural Properties of Japan - archaeological materials (Hokkaidō)
- List of Cultural Properties of Japan - historical materials (Hokkaidō)
- List of Cultural Properties of Japan - paintings (Hokkaidō)
- List of Historic Sites of Japan (Hokkaidō)
- Hokkaido Museum
