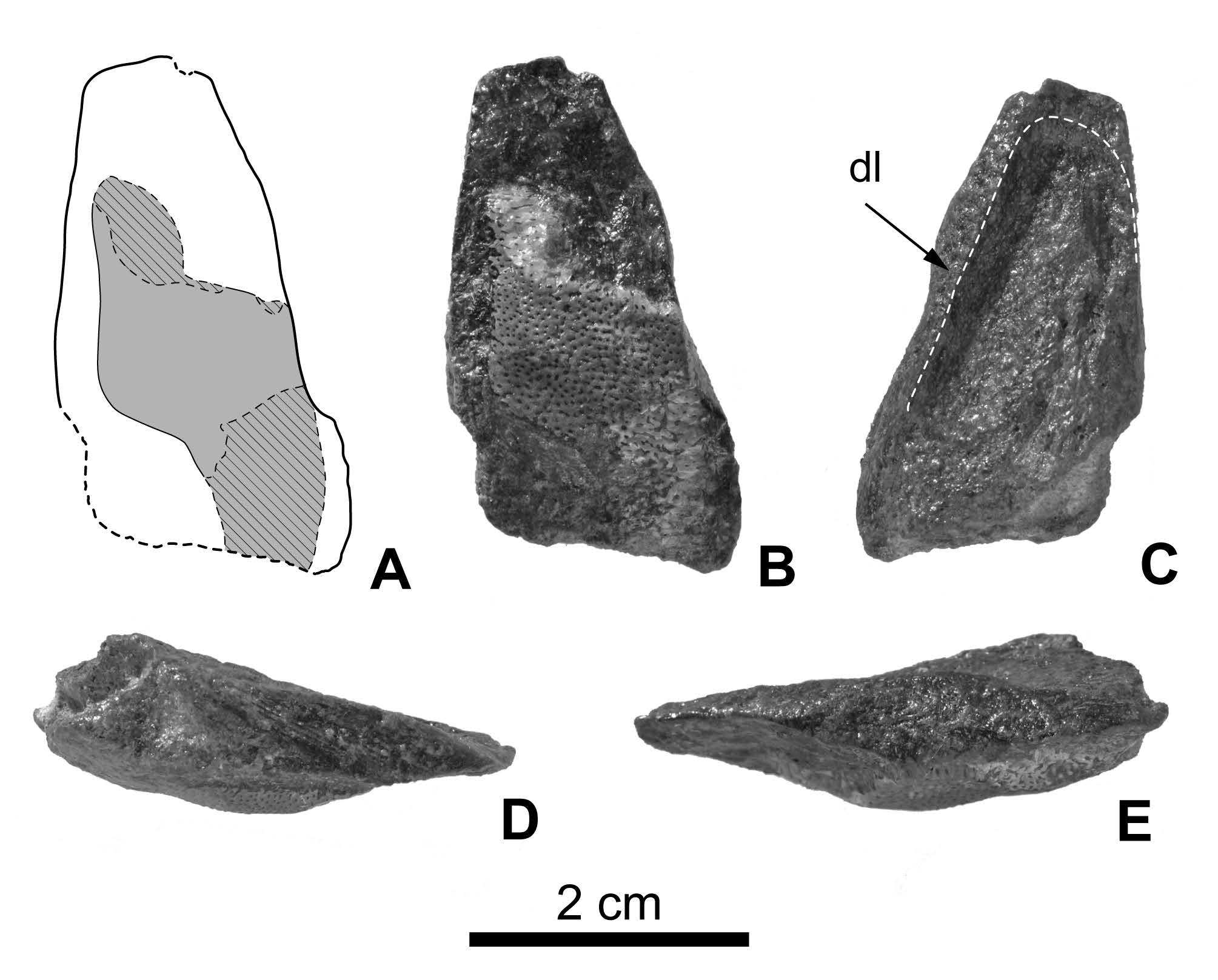
- Type specimen

Scientific classification
- Kingdom: Animalia
- Phylum: Chordata
- Class: Chondrichthyes
- Subclass: Holocephali
- Order: Chimaeriformes
- Family: Callorhinchidae
- Genus: Callorhinchus
- Species: †C. orientalis

Binomial name
- †Callorhinchus orientalis Ota et al., 2025

= Callorhinchus orientalis =

Callorhinchus orientalis Temporal range: Maastrichtian

Extinct species of fish

Callorhinchus orientalis is an extinct species of plough-nosed chimaeras (also called elephantfish) in the genus Callorhinchus that lived during the Maastrichtian stage of the Cretaceous period.

== Distribution ==
Callorhinchus orientalis is known from the Hakobuchi Formation of Hokkaido, Japan. Members of Callorhinchus had two pairs of platelike teeth in the upper jaw, with one pair in the lower jaw.

On April 9, 2025, a fossilized tooth, originally found in Hobetsu in 2013, was identified as being the first known case in the North Pacific of Callorhinchus orientalis. The upper jaw tooth, approximately 3.2 centimeters long and 1.5 cm wide, was found by Sapporo researchers in a stratum dating back roughly 72 million years. The fossilized tooth featured a pawlike bulge, a characteristic previously unseen in previously known extinct species. The discovery was announced by the Mukawa Town Hobetsu Museum and the Hokkaido University Museum.
