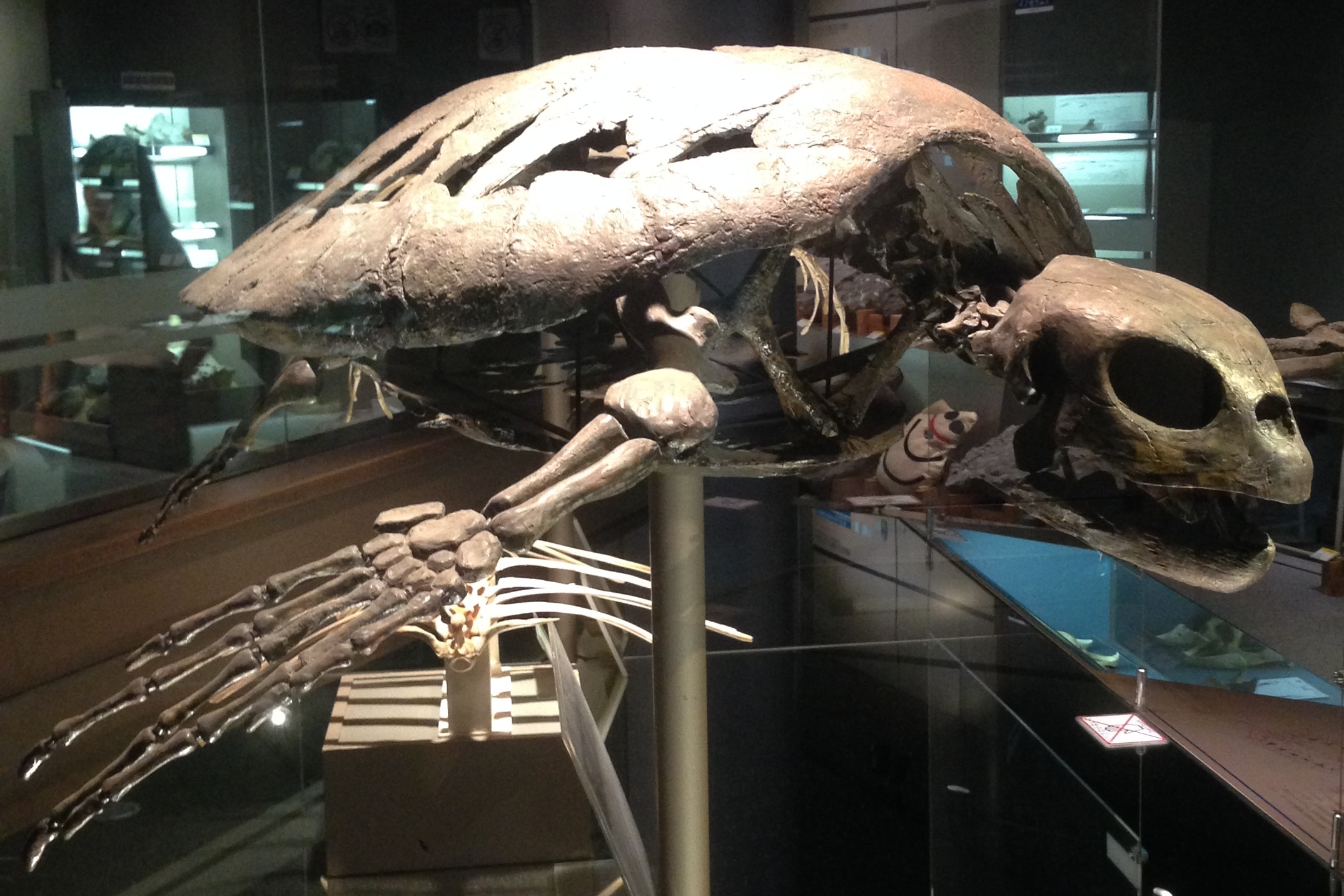
- Mesodermochelys undulatus

Scientific classification
- Kingdom: Animalia
- Phylum: Chordata
- Class: Reptilia
- Order: Testudines
- Suborder: Cryptodira
- Family: Dermochelyidae
- Genus: †Mesodermochelys; Hirayama & Chitoku, 1996

Type species
- †Mesodermochelys undulatus Hirayama & Chitoku, 1996

= Mesodermochelys =

Mesodermochelys Temporal range: Late Cretaceous Campanian–Maastrichtian

Extinct genus of turtles

Mesodermochelys is an extinct genus of sea turtle known from the Campanian to the Maastrichtian (Late Cretaceous) of what today is Japan and from the Maastrichtian of Chile. One species is known, the type species M. undulatus; it was given its binomial name by Ren Hirayama and Tsutomu Chitoku in 1996. Studies of its skull indicate that it was a primitive member of the Dermochelyidae (leatherback turtle family) that was closely related to the Protostegidae. It has been described as the best representative of Mesozoic dermochelyids.

== Description ==
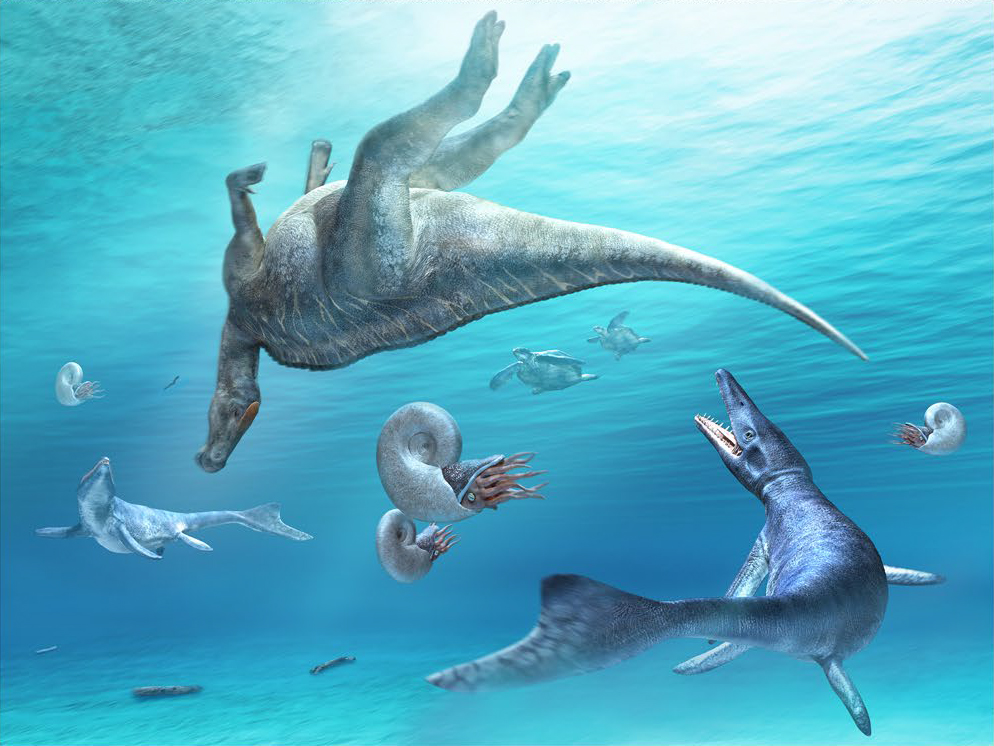
Restoration of two Mesodermochelys (middle) and other sea creatures swimming around a Kamuysaurus carcass

Like other dermochelyids, Mesodermochelys had elongated front flippers. One fossil found in Japan's Kagawa Prefecture had a carapace estimated to be 1.3 m (4.3 ft) in length, and specimen from Hokkaido had carapace up to 1.5 m (4.9 ft). Largest specimen is estimated to have shell around 2 m (6.6 ft), possibly comparable with Archelon. Only the neural or spinal scutes, or individual plates, of the carapace are well grooved.

== Specimens ==
The holotype specimen of Mesodermochelys undulatus Hobetsu Museum (HMG) 5 was collected in 1980 from the Maastrichtian Hakobuchi Formation (Yezo Group) in Inasato, Hobetsu, Hokkaido, Japan. It comprises a supraoccipital and partial postcranial skeleton and was reported in 1996 along with 14 referred specimens collected between 1977 and 1994 and also reposited at HMG.

In October 2005, Yoshiyuki Hattori uncovered a skull presumed to be Mesodermochelys, from an unnamed Santonian-aged interval of the Yezo Group in Hokkaido. The skull is very well preserved but is missing most of the dermal roof bones through weathering. It was donated to the defunct Historical Museum of Hokkaido, which has since been integrated into and replaced by the Hokkaido Museum.
