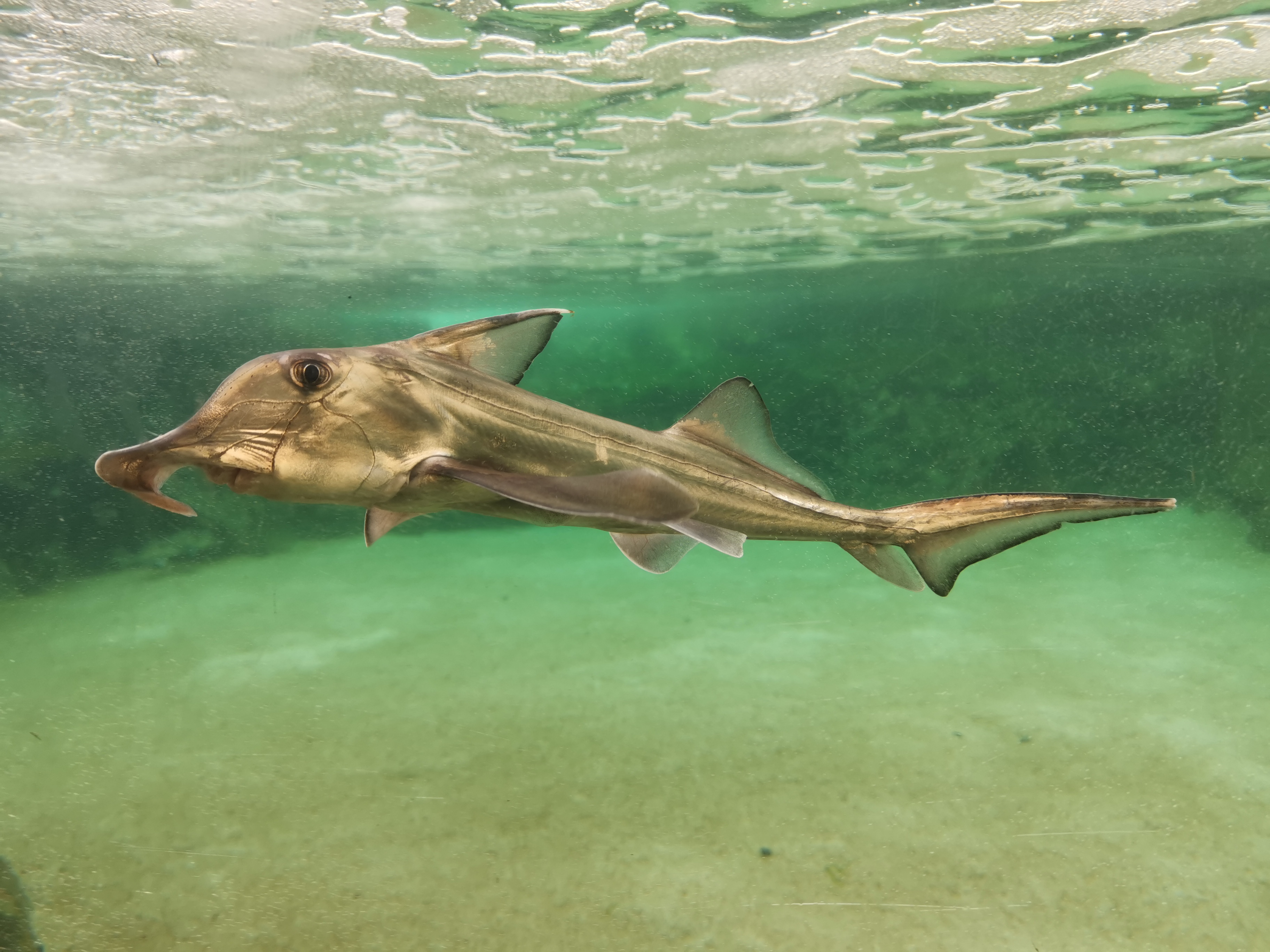

Conservation status
- Least Concern (IUCN 3.1)

Scientific classification
- Kingdom: Animalia
- Phylum: Chordata
- Class: Chondrichthyes
- Subclass: Holocephali
- Order: Chimaeriformes
- Family: Callorhinchidae
- Genus: Callorhinchus
- Species: C. capensis

Binomial name
- Callorhinchus capensis A. H. A. Duméril, 1865

= Cape elephantfish =

Species of cartilaginous fish

The Cape elephantfish (Callorhinchus capensis) is species of chimaera (a type of cartilaginous fish) in the genus Callorhinchus. It is native to the waters surrounding South Africa. It is sometimes called the St Joseph shark, though it is not a true shark.

== Description ==
Adult Cape elephantfish can be anywhere from 45–120 centimetres (1.48–3.94 ft) in length and weigh between 3–5 kilograms (6.6–11.0 lb) with females tending to be larger than males. They are silver to bronze overall and generally have a more yellowish hue than their close relatives in the genus Callorhinchus. They have a dark band down the middle of the back which the dorsal fins interrupt and the fins tend to be a bit darker than the rest of the body. Cape elephantfish have two dorsal fins which are very distant from each other on the back, the second being slightly longer than the first. The primary dorsal fin begins before the insertion of the pectoral fins and has a long venomous spine on its anterior side which is free from the fin in its upper ¾ section. This spine is serrated at its tip. The secondary dorsal fin begins posterior to the base of the pelvic fins and ends just at the base of the caudal (tail) fin. The caudal fin itself is heterocercal, meaning the vertebral column extends into the upper lobe and consists of two lobes separated by a deep notch. They have enlarged pectoral fins which allow them to swim slowly at the bottom of the water column. This feature as well as the reduced caudal fin is exhibited by many deep water, slow moving fish as adaptations for this lifestyle.

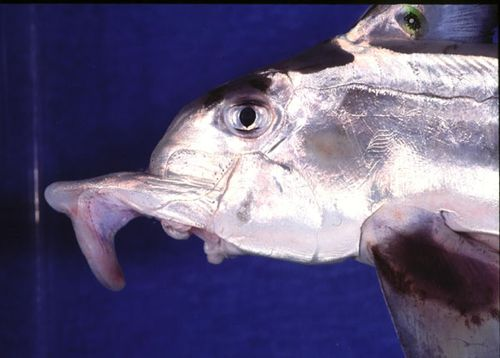
The head of a C. capensis, showcasing the species' large proboscis

The most prominent feature of the genus Callorhinchus is the proboscis, which is flat and depressed at its base and narrow and compressed at its end. It has a curve at the end behind which it has a thin cutaneous membrane. This flap of skin is three times as long as it is broad, differentiating it from other members of its genus. The structure of the proboscis is made of cartilage over which the skin of the upper lip is stretched. They have vertical pupils. This genus can also be distinguished from the others by the smaller and more pointed upper front teeth.

Males have paired testes which are kidney-shaped. They increase in mass as the fish approaches sexual maturity. The sperm of Cape elephantfish is packaged in 1mm spermatophores which are suspended in a green gelatinous matrix. During growth, males develop several secondary sexual characteristics. These include claspers on the inner edge of their pelvic fins which average 8.9 centimetres (3.5 in) in length. They also grow two tenacula anterior to the pelvic fins which, along with the claspers, allow them to grasp a female during mating. Males develop a frontal tenaculum, which is a large flexible projection in the center of the forehead. This tenaculum is covered in denticles (enameloid-covered scales which are similar in structure to teeth) which harden as the animal becomes sexually mature.

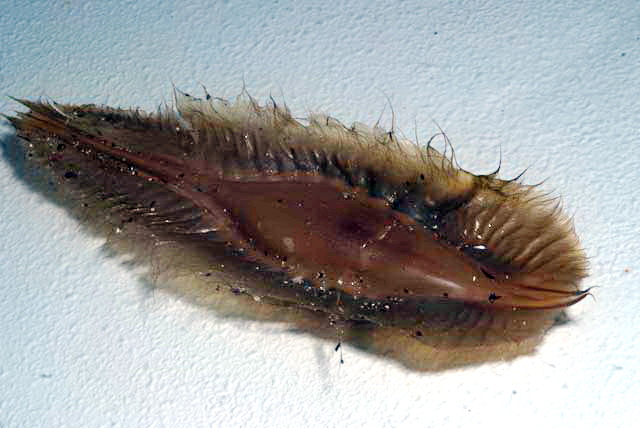
Egg capsule of C. capensis

Females develop a nidamental gland and their ovaries increase in mass as they mature. They do not develop any secondary sexual characteristics but mature females often have a semen plug after they have been inseminated. This plug starts as a translucent, waxy, dark green substance, becoming paler and softer as eggs develop inside the female. The egg cases of Cape elephantfish are leathery and oval shaped, and are about 18 centimetres (7.1 in) long. It has one smooth side and one hairy side. The outer edge of the case has a frill.

== Distribution ==
Cape elephantfish are found on continental shelves in the waters surrounding South Africa, and are the only members of the Callorhinchus genus in this area. They have been reported as far north as Natal and Namibia. They are found down to 399 metres (1,309 ft) deep but they become less common with increasing depth. Cape elephantfish prefer habitat in sheltered bays with cold, murky water and soft substrate. Juveniles tend to be found closer to shore while the larger adults can be found further from shore and at deeper depth. They are only found in salt water and never in brackish or fresh water.

== Taxonomy ==
Cape elephantfish or Callorhinchus capensis is in the class Chondrichthyes (cartilaginous fish) which also contains the sharks and rays. It is in the order Chimaeriformes (chimaeras) in the subclass Holocephali which is distinguished from the superficially similar sharks of the clade Selachii by an upper jaw that is fused to the skull.

Callorhinchidae, the family that contains Cape elephantfish, separated from Rhinochimaeridae (long nosed chimaeras) and Chimaeridae (short nosed chimaeras) about 187 million years ago. The clade that these three extant families originated from was once much more successful with its peak diversity during the Carboniferous period. Callorhinchidae is likely the most basal family of the three and is made up of just one genus with three extant species: Callorhinchus capensis, C. milii, and C. callorhynchus. Licht et al. (2012) found that C. capensis is the most basal of the three with C. milii and C. callorhynchus being more closely related to each other than either is to C. capensis, but these species require more attention to be certain of their relationships.

== Ecology ==
Cape elephantfish feed on bottom-dwelling invertebrates found in the soft substrate of their habitat. They use their proboscis to probe in this substrate for food items. They most commonly feed on bivalves (Most frequently Phaxas decipens) and crustaceans, but occasionally eat gastropods such as Nassarius speciosus, polychaetes, and even some fish like the Southern African anchovy (Engraulis capensis). The Cape elephantfish is nocturnal (more active at night than during the day).

Cape elephantfish are preyed upon by Cape fur seals and sharks. Recent evidence has suggested that seals prey on Chondrichthyans more than we previously suspected. This was difficult to discover as these fish do not leave behind hard parts for researchers to find in scat, such as bones or otoliths, like teleostian fish do. Chondrichthyans such as Cape elephantfish are preyed upon by pinnipeds at depths of up to at least 600m off the coasts of Namibia and South Africa, and Cape elephantfish are particularly vulnerable as they are the only chondrichthyan in the southeastern Atlantic that regularly seeks out shallow water. Researchers monitoring Cape fur seals have found many seals dead or injured due to Cape elephantfish spines embedded in their necks. Pinnipeds such as Cape fur seals tend to shake their prey after catching it, so it is possible that this action is causing the spines of these fish to become lodged in the necks of seals. This discovery may suggest that chimaeras such as Cape elephantfish are being preyed upon by seals more frequently than before, suggesting a shift in food web dynamics and possibly a lack of other more suitable prey for Cape fur seals.

Chondrichthyan eggs are often fed on by predatory gastropods which bore holes into the leathery casing and consume developing embryos. But researchers have found eggs of Cape elephantfish are less susceptible. When they are found washed up on shore they are often damaged or hatched but rarely predated on by gastropods. This may be because they are laid in sand rather than reefs where gastropods are more plentiful.

=== Parasites ===
Cape elephantfish are parasitized by five taxa including tapeworms, monogeneans, and leeches. The most common parasitic species is Gyrocotyle plana, a cestode parasite, which is found in the spiral intestines of many adult Cape elephantfish. Another common parasite found on Cape elephantfish is Callorhynchocotyle, a monogenean flatworm. These parasites are a genus only found on holocephalans. They seem to have close ties with this group, evolving alongside it and specializing on particular species. Parasites may also be early indicators of bioaccumulation of metals in these fish. The relationship between Chondrichthyans and their parasites is very complex and understanding the parasite ecology of these fish may help us manage them more effectively in the future.

=== Reproduction ===
Adult Cape elephantfish spend most of their time in deep water but, during the summer, breeding adults congregate inshore to mate and lay eggs. Mating occurs over a long period, primarily during the summer, but continuing throughout the year and females may mate more than once per year. During breeding, females produce anywhere from one to 22 eggs, producing more eggs as they age. Unfertilized eggs are often reabsorbed during the winter to conserve energy for the female. Cape elephantfish eggs are often found in Robberg Marine Protected Area, suggesting they have a larger nursery in this area.

== Conservation status ==
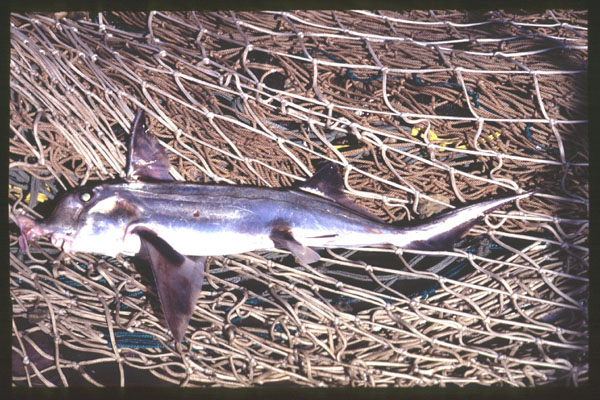
A C. capensis caught by a net

Cape elephantfish are considered to be of Least Concern by the IUCN as of 2019. However, there is some concern about overexploitation of Cape elephantfish by fisheries. Cape elephantfish is particularly sensitive to fishing as they school in groups segregated by sex and have nurseries in shallow bays. This means a single trawl may remove a large amount of a single sex, reducing the viability of the population. They are targeted in shallow waters near shore where breeding adults and juveniles congregate, and eggs are laid. They likely experience higher impacts of fishing as juveniles and egg cases are often accidental bycatch of fishing operations. These practices are concerning as their population could collapse due to lack of reproduction and culling of lower age classes. The fishing methods used in their shallow feeding areas may also inhibit their access to food as trawling disturbs the soft substrate where they find benthic invertebrates to prey on.

Cape elephantfish is considered to be among several economically important species in South Africa that are particularly sensitive to climate change. A primary concern is that more frequent storms may dislodge more eggs and strand them on beaches, causing them to dry out and die. They are also vulnerable to pollution. They have been found to concentrate high levels of heavy metals in their tissue, likely originating from agricultural, industrial, and urban runoff, as well as commercial fishing operations. This vulnerability is exacerbated by the pressures placed on them by fishing operations. Cape elephantfish have several features that may make it more resilient to overfishing and climate change. It has a fairly broad distribution, and is fast growing compared to other cartilaginous fish that are targeted by fisheries.

== Human use ==
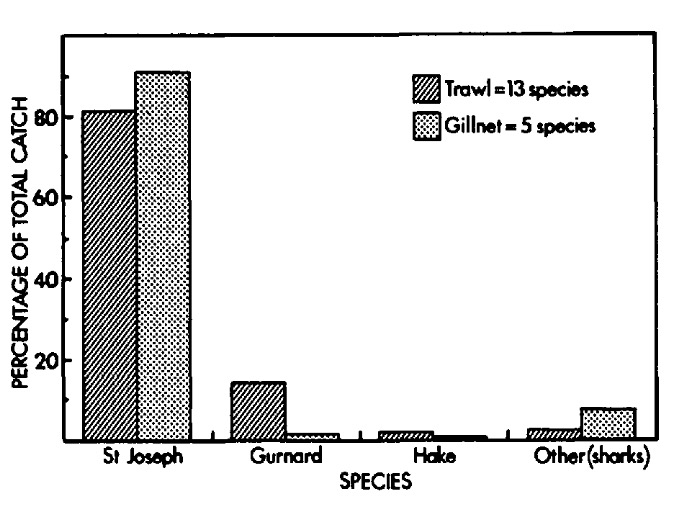
Proportions of catch landed by gillnet during the daylight hours of one vessel and one 30 minute trawl in St Helena Bay (from Freer & Griffiths, 1993).

Cape elephantfish are primarily fished between Mossel Bay and Elands Bay where around 700-900 tons of them are landed each year. While they were initially considered “trash fish” they are now the most common species of cartilaginous fish targeted by fisheries and landed as bycatch off the Cape of South Africa and have some importance to the fisheries and fishermen there. They are caught using gillnets, beach seine, and as bycatch of demersal trawl. The Cape elephantfish is the only Chondrichthyan not released when caught in beach seine nets on the west coast of South Africa. The other chondrichthyans often caught in this fishery are smoothound shark, lesser sandshark, blue stingray, and eagle ray which are all required to be released according to permit restrictions. In this area, the minimum stretched mesh size of the wings of beach-seine nets is 48mm and the codend is 44mm. The minimum stretched mesh size of gillnets is 176–180 millimetres (6.9–7.1 in).
