= Kashima Formation =

Sedimentary formation in Hokkaido, Japan

- Stratigraphic range: Early Coniacian
- Type: Geological formation
- Unit of: Yezo Group
- Underlies: Hakobuchi Formation
- Overlies: Saku Formation
- Thickness: 1,000 metres (3,280 ft) to 2,500 metres (8,200 ft)

Lithology
- Primary: Mudstone, Sandstone, Tuff

Location
- Region: East Asia
- Country: Japan
- Extent: Hokkaido

The Kashima Formation is a stratum distributed in Hokkaido, Japan. It is a sedimentary rock formation that constitutes part of the Yezo Group, whose creation corresponds to the Upper Turonian to Lower Campanian time periods. The lower layer of the stratum meets the Saku Formation, and the upper layer the Hakobuchi Formation.

It is considered contemporaneous to the Haborogawa Formation, having been formed through deposition in waters offshore and deeper than those where the Haborogawa Formation was formed. This makes the two formations lateral facies of each other, and the two are identified in neighbouring areas within Hokkaido.

== Nomenclature ==
A study by Nagao et al. in 1954 had differentiated the region that would be the Kashima Formation into the Isojirosawa shale layer without tuff and the Kōsenzawa shale layer that contained tuff. However, since outcrops with tuff in the former and outcrops without tuff in the latter were confirmed, Motoyama et al. (1991) adjudged that, due to the interspersed nature of these layers and geological complexity, differentiation was impossible, and subdivision into multiple layers could not occur. The formation was then proposed to be named after the Kashima area in Yūbari, Hokkaido.

This Motoyama et al. paper was one of the first to propose the Kashima Formation as a distinct layer and as a part of the Yezo Group; this was reinforced by Takashima et al. in 2004. Unlike the Motoyama et al. paper, Takashima et al. included the overlying Hakobuchi Formation within the Yezo Group as well.

== Stratigraphy ==
The formation is distributed in the northern Hobetsu, Yūbari, and Tomiuchi-Azumi areas in the central-southern parts of Hokkaido. Layer thicknesses exceed 2500 m in the northern Hobetsu area and 1000 m in the Tomiuchi-Azumi area. Thicknesses between 1400 and 2000 m have been discovered in the Yūbari area. In the Yūbari area, a conformity with the Saku and Hakobuchi Formations is noted, while its lower boundaries have not been confirmed in the northern Hobetsu and Tomiuchi-Azumi areas.

It is found that the deposition of the Kashima formation occurs later temporally in the southern Yūbari area compared to the other aforementioned areas. In particular, while the boundary with the Saku formation corresponds to the central-to-upper Turonian stages in the northern-central part of the Yūbari area, the southern part of the area corresponds to the boundary between the Turonian and Coniacian periods. This inference is derived from the stratigraphic relationships of the Inoceramus fossils found in the formation.

== Lithofacies ==
The Kashima Formation is composed primarily of dark grey mudstone formed through bioturbation, with intersections of felsic and siliceous tuff.

The formation is subdivided into two units labelled Ua and Ub, with the Turonian-Coniacian boundary running through the middle part of the Ua unit and the Coniacian-Santonian boundary running through the uppermost part of the Ub unit. The Ua unit consists of dark grey hard mudstone and tuff sandstone that contains fragments of Inoceramus fossils. Compared to the Ub unit, it indicates less bioturbation and also features foliation. The Ub layer comprises light grey mudstone usually sandwiched between layers of tuffy sandstone and tuff. It has also been reported that bioturbation is more pronounced in the upper part of the unit than the lower.

The discovery of benthic foraminifera fossils in the middle-to-upper layers of the formation, in studies in the Tomiuchi-Azumi area, led to the conclusion that the sedimentary environment from the upper portions of the Saku Formation to the Kashima Formation was previously in a marine or oceanic environment. This has been reiterated, and it has also been established that this oceanic environment was in deeper waters than those of the Haborogawa Formation.

== Fossils ==
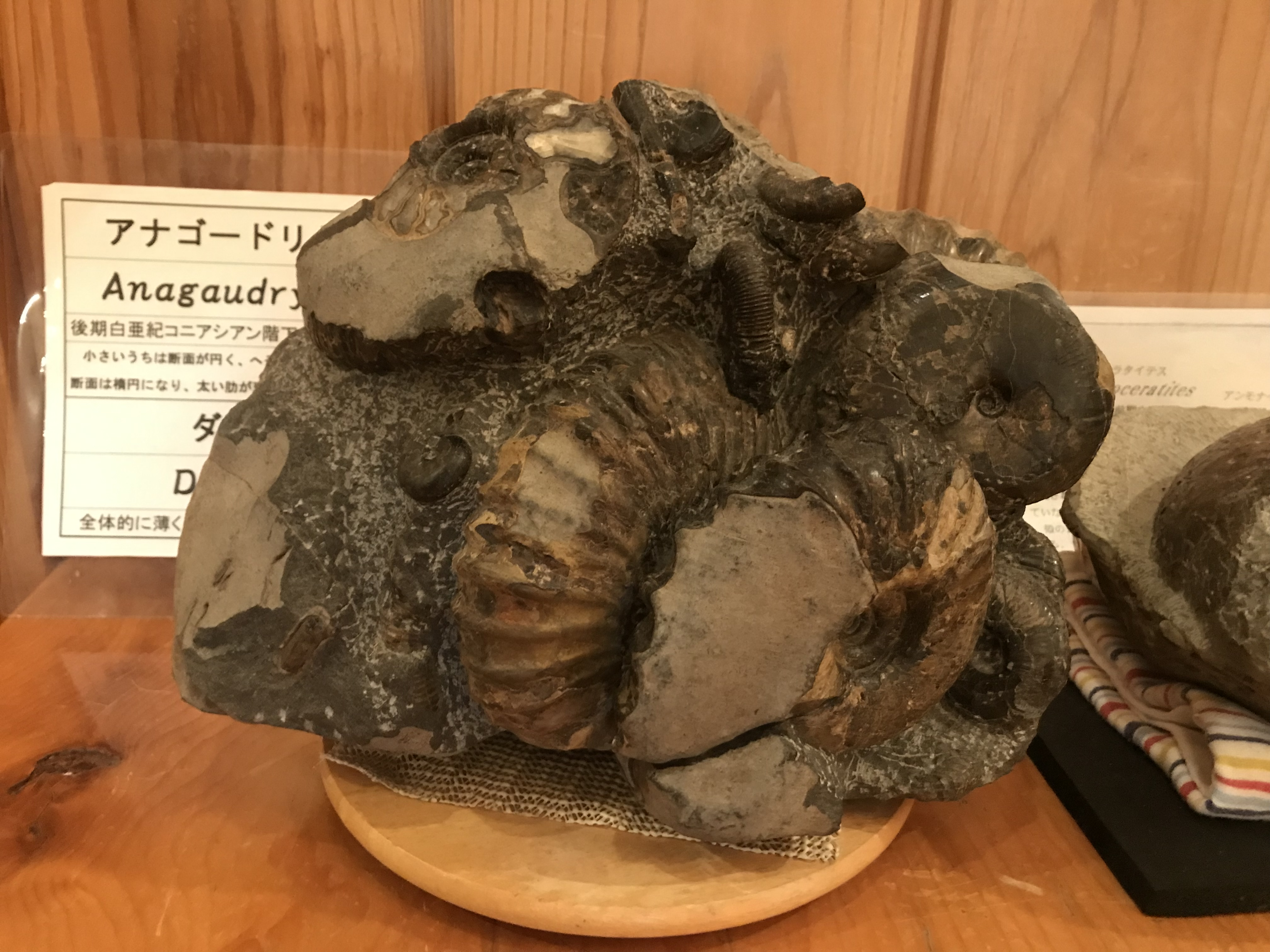
Anagaudryceras limatum and Damesites sugata from the Coniacian stage

The Ua unit of the Kashima Formation is relatively scarcer in biological fossils, while the Ub unit is far richer in fossils. In macroscopic fossils, two types of ammonites are known from the Ua unit. These are Anagaudryceras limatum and Damesites sugata. Two other species are documented in this layer — Inoceramus uwajimensis and Mytiloides incertus.

Within the Ub unit, members of the Inoceramus family are found in abundance, particularly Inoceramus uwajimensis, which is the only one of these also found in the Ua layer. Ammonites found in the Ub unit include those from the genera Anagaudryceras, Damesites, Gaudryceras, Mesopuzosia, Neophylloceras, Scalarites, and Scaphites.

Among the hesperornithiform fossil birds, skeletal remains of Chupkaornis keraorum has been found in this formation.
