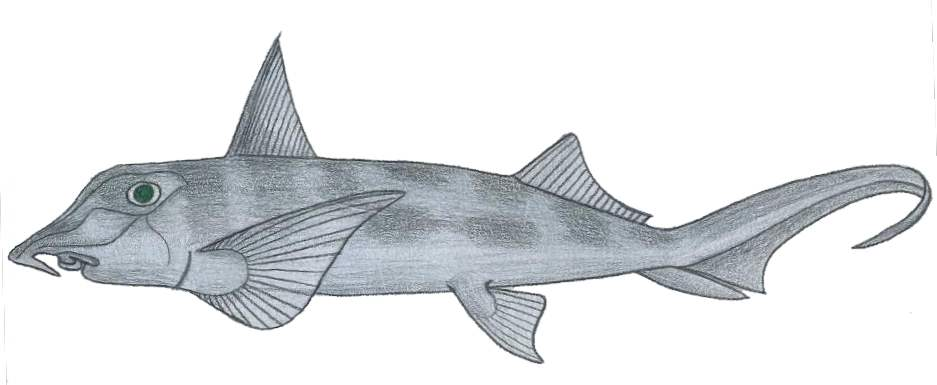

Conservation status
- Vulnerable (IUCN 3.1)

Scientific classification
- Kingdom: Animalia
- Phylum: Chordata
- Class: Chondrichthyes
- Subclass: Holocephali
- Order: Chimaeriformes
- Family: Callorhinchidae
- Genus: Callorhinchus
- Species: C. callorynchus

Binomial name
- Callorhinchus callorynchus (Linnaeus, 1758)
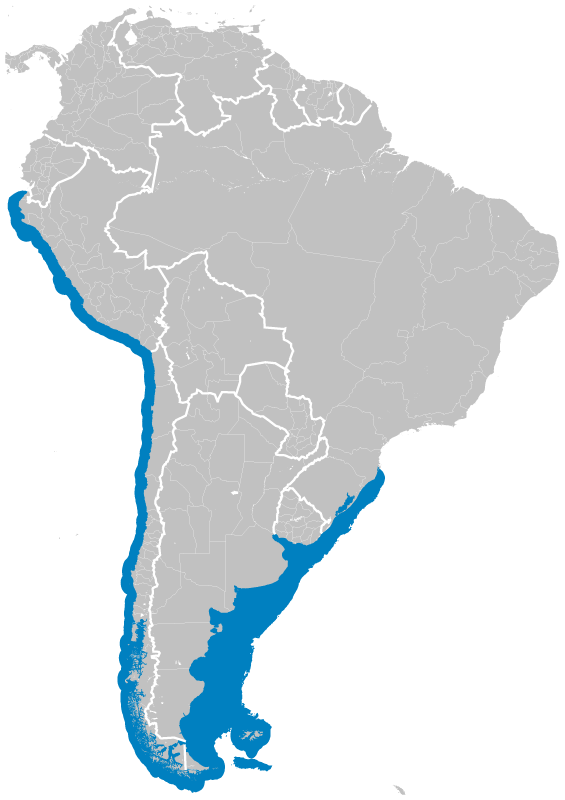
- American elephantfish range.

= Callorhinchus callorynchus =

Species of fish

The American elephantfish (Callorhinchus callorynchus), commonly referred to as the cockfish, is a species of chimaera belonging to the family Callorhinchidae.

== Description ==
This species has a silver to gray body with prominent brown spots concentrated on the dorsal half of the fish and on the fins. Hues of pink are also present around areas such as the mouth and fins.

C. callorynchus forages for prey by benthic foraging, or sifting through the sludge of the ocean floor. Its sub-terminal plough-shaped snout is adapted for crushing invertebrate prey including scallops, mollusks, and other benthic invertebrates. Its strong jaws contain tooth plates, which are structures in the mouth designed to crush hard-shelled prey. Furthermore, sexual dimorphism is present in this species, with females reaching lengths of up to 102 centimeters and males growing to about 85 centimeters. Upon birth, juveniles measure approximately 13 centimeters in length.

== Distribution ==
Callorhinchus callorynchus is a species predominantly found in the coastal waters of southern Brazil, Peru, Chile, Argentina, and Uruguay. This species inhabits the open seas of the southeast Pacific Ocean and southwest Atlantic Ocean, with a preferred depth range of approximately 200 meters. However, during their reproductive cycle, including mating and egg-laying periods, these fish are known to migrate to shallow coastal waters. They are closely related to the Australian ghostshark (C. milii), which is found in the sea floors surrounding Australia in the southwest Pacific Ocean, and the Cape elephantfish (C. capensis), off the coast of South Africa.

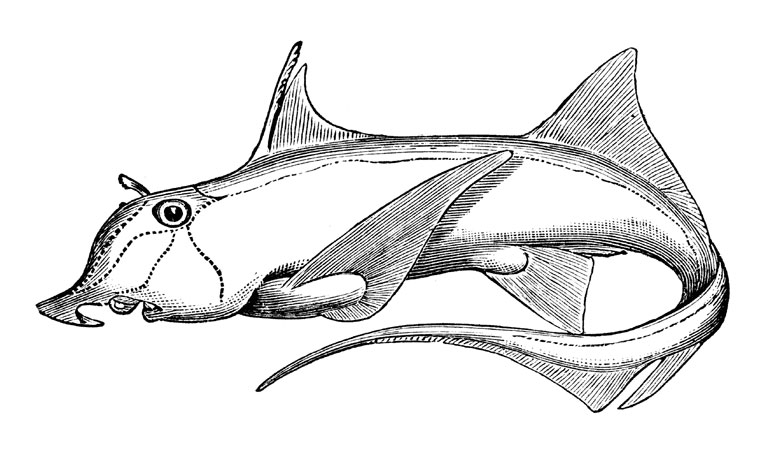
Male Callorhinchus callorynchus

== Biology ==
The mating and egg-laying cycle of C. callorynchus happens primarily in the spring and early summer months, typically in shallow murky waters at depths of around 30 meters. C. callorynchus are oviparous, in which their eggs are internally fertilized and laid to mature and hatch outside of the female body. This reproductive process is highly dependent on water temperature, with optimal conditions ranging between 14 °C and 16 °C. This acts as a biological trigger for the onset of egg-laying. Once fertilized, the embryonic development of this species spans a period of six to eight months.

The eggs themselves are yellowish-brown in color and spindle-shaped, measuring approximately 13 to 18 centimeters in length. They are also asymmetrical, with one side of the egg being flat and covered in a hairy texture, while the other side is round and smooth, providing additional protection for the developing embryo. The odd shape of the egg is vital for its success in remaining buried within the sediments. Adult females of this species typically reach sexual maturity between six and seven years of age, whereas males mature earlier, usually between four and five years. The relatively late sexual maturity is consistent with the species's lifespan, which averages fifteen to twenty years. This longevity allows for extended growth and development before reproduction. The species exhibits selective feeding behavior based on sex, age, and prey availability, often targeting different species of scallops depending on factors such as prey strength, behavior, and size.

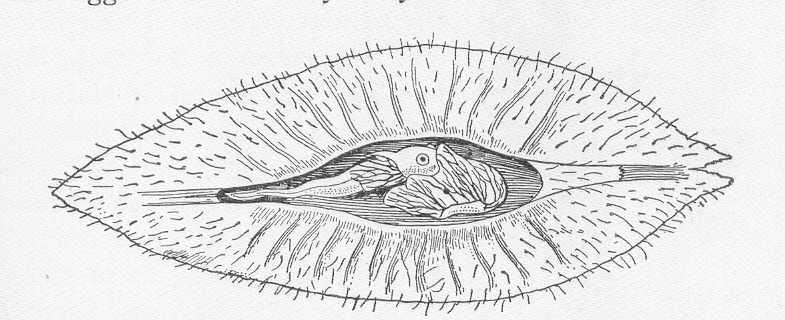
C. callorynchus egg case

== Conservation status ==
The cockfish is currently listed as vulnerable (VU) on the IUCN Red List, with its population steadily declining due to environmental pressures, particularly overfishing. This species plays a vital role in the Argentine fisheries. It is often caught for its meat and as bycatch in commercial fishing operations. The pressures from these fisheries are contributing significantly to the decline of this species.

A study was conducted on the reproductive biology of the cockfish by Melisa A. Chierichetti from UNMDP, which found that there was a presence of sexual dimorphism, where the females were larger and heavier than the males of that population. Another aspect of this study had discovered that the relative fecundity rate of the C. callorynchus population was significantly low because the females were in the resting stage of their reproductive cycle. Also, the males in the population weren't mature, thus the population was found to not be highly reproductive. This information was expected to be helpful in implementing methods for conservation and reduced over-fishing.

The vulnerability of C. callorynchus is heightened by several biological and environmental factors. Its tendency to form large aggregations makes it particularly susceptible to overfishing, while its low fecundity rate and late sexual maturity further reduce its ability to recover from population declines. Additionally, global environmental changes pose a significant threat to this species. Rising sea temperatures, driven by climate change, has the potential to disrupt their reproductive cycles. These fish rely on specific water temperatures between 14 °C and 16 °C to trigger their instinctual migration to shallower waters for mating and egg-laying.

Furthermore, the food supply of C. callorynchus is at risk due to coastal pollution, particularly along the Brazilian coastline. Warmer water temperatures have led to an increase in nutrient and bacterial blooms, which negatively impact the populations of scallops, one of the primary prey species for C. callorynchus.
