= Hakobuchi Formation =

Geological formation in Hokkaido, Japan

- Stratigraphic range: Early Maastrichtian
- Type: Geological formation
- Unit of: Yezo Group
- Underlies: Ishikari Group, Poronai Group
- Overlies: Haborogawa Formation, Kashima Formation
- Thickness: Over 450 metres (1,480 ft)

Lithology
- Primary: Mudstone, Siltstone, Sandstone
- Other: Tuffite

Location
- Location: 42.8°N 142.14°E
- Region: East Asia
- Country: Japan
- Extent: Hokkaido
- Hakobuchi Formation (Japan)

The Hakobuchi Formation is a geological formation in Hokkaido, Japan. It is the uppermost unit of the Yezo Group, being early Maastrichtian in age. It consists of bioturbated glauconitic sandstones, siltstones and conglomerates with coaly mudstone and minor tuffite. It was deposited in a continental shelf setting. It is noted for its fossil content with the invertebrates mainly consisting of bivalves and ammonites. With vertebrates including the mosasaurs Mosasaurus hobetsuensis and Phosphorosaurus ponpetelegans. As well the sea turtle Mesodermochelys and the hadrosaurid dinosaur Kamuysaurus.

== Fossil content ==
Color key: Taxon / Reclassified taxon / Taxon falsely reported as present / Dubious taxon or junior synonym / Ichnotaxon / Ootaxon / Morphotaxon	Notes; Uncertain or tentative taxa are in small text; ~~crossed out~~ taxa are discredited.

=== Dinosaurs ===
==== Ornithopods ====
Ornithopods of the Hakobuchi Formation
Genus	Species	Location	Stratigraphic position	Material	Notes	Images
Kamuysaurus	K. japonicus				A edmontosaurin saurolophine	

=== Mosasaurs ===
Mosasaurs of the Hakobuchi Formation
Genus	Species	Location	Stratigraphic position	Material	Notes	Images
Mosasaurus	M. hobetsuensis				A mosasaurine mosasaurid	
Phosphorosaurus	P. ponpetelegans				A halisaurine mosasaurid	

=== Turtles ===
Turtles of the Hakobuchi Formation
Genus	Species	Location	Stratigraphic position	Material	Notes	Images
Mesodermochelys	M. undulatus				A dermochelyid turtle	

=== Fish ===
==== Cartilaginous Fish ====
Cartilaginous Fish of the Hakobuchi Formation
Genus	Species	Location	Stratigraphic position	Material	Notes	Images
Callorhinchus	C. orientalis				A callorhinchid chimaeran	

==== Ray-finned Fish ====
Ray-finned Fish of the Hakobuchi Formation
Genus	Species	Location	Stratigraphic position	Material	Notes	Images
Acipenseridae					A sturgeon	

=== Molluscs ===
==== Bivalves ====
Bivalves of the Hakobuchi Formation
Genus	Species	Location	Stratigraphic position	Material	Notes	Images
Inoceramus	I. nipponicus				A inoceramid bivalve	

==== Cephalopods ====
Cephalopods of the Hakobuchi Formation
Genus	Species	Location	Stratigraphic position	Material	Notes	Images
Pachydiscus	P. japonicus				A pachydiscid ammonite	

==== Gastropods ====
Gastropods of the Hakobuchi Formation
Genus	Species	Location	Stratigraphic position	Material	Notes	Images

=== Paleoflora ===
Plants of the Hakobuchi Formation
Genus	Species	Location	Stratigraphic position	Material	Notes	Images
Mukawastrobus	M. satoi				A cypress	
Nilssonia	N. yezoensis				A cycad	
