= Astreptoceras =

Astreptoceras Temporal range: Campanian

Scientific classification
- Kingdom: Animalia
- Phylum: Mollusca
- Class: Cephalopoda
- Subclass: †Ammonoidea
- Order: †Ammonitida
- Suborder: †Ancyloceratina
- Family: †Diplomoceratidae
- Genus: †Astreptoceras; Henderson, 1970
- Species: †A. zelandicum

Binomial name
- †Astreptoceras zelandicum (Marshall, 1926)

Synonyms
- Ptychoceras zelandicum (Marshall, 1926)

Extinct monotypic genus of ammonites

Astreptoceras is an extinct upper Cretaceous ammonoid cephalopod named by Henderson in 1970. Fossils belonging to this genera have been found in Antarctica and New Zealand.

The only described species is Astreptoceras zelandicum (Marshall, 1926). It is a small heteromorph ammonite with almost circular cross-section of the shell. Shell has probably only one straight shaft that is initially without ribs and constrictions. At diameter of about 2 mm there appears first constrictions and at late growth stages, these can be preceded by a collar and shallow secondary constriction. Weak ribs occurs at late growth stages.
