= Yezo Group =

Geological group located in Sakhalin and Hokkaido

- Stratigraphic range: Aptian–Paleocene
- Type: Stratigraphic group
- Sub-units: Shuparogawa Formation, Maruyama Formation, Hikagenosawa Formation, Saku Formation, Mikasa Formation, Kashima Formation, Haborogawa Formation, Osoushinai Formation, Hakobuchi Formation
- Underlies: Ishikari Group, Poronai Group, Neogene deposits
- Overlies: Sorachi Group
- Thickness: 10,000 metres (32,810 ft)

Lithology
- Primary: Mudstone, sandstone
- Other: Tuffite, conglomerate

Location
- Region: Hokkaido; Sakhalin
- Country: Japan, Russia

The Yezo Group is a stratigraphic group in Hokkaido, Japan and Sakhalin, Russia which is primarily Late Cretaceous in age (Aptian to Earliest Paleocene). It is exposed as roughly north–south trending belt extending 1,500 kilometres through central Hokkaido from Urakawa to Cape Sōya and Sakhalin from the south coast to Alexandrovsk-Sakhalinsky District. It consists of marine forearc basin sediments, typically turbiditic and bioturbated mudstones and sandstones with subordinate conglomerate primarily deposited on the continental shelf and slope of the ancient Yezo subduction margin. It forms a continuous depositional sequence with the Sorachi Group, which overlies the Horokanai Ophiolite. The sequence gradually shallows upwards with the terminal Hakobuchi Formation representing a fluvial-inner shelf environment.

Numerous fossils are known from the unit, mostly ammonites and bivalves, but also marine vertebrates such as mosasaurs, plesiosaurs and marine turtles. Dinosaur remains are among the fossils that have been recovered from the group. These include a partial cervical vertebra and right hand from the therizinosaurid Paralitherizinosaurus, from Early Campanian Osoushinai Formation from northern Hokkaido. Nipponosaurus is known from an unnamed unit of the group from Southern Sakhalin, probably late Santonian or early Campanian in age. Kamuysaurus, which is known from the early Maastrichtian Hakobuchi Formation of southern Hokkaido, was also discovered in layers of this group.

== Fossil content ==
=== Reptiles ===
Color key: Taxon / Reclassified taxon / Taxon falsely reported as present / Dubious taxon or junior synonym / Ichnotaxon / Ootaxon / Morphotaxon	Notes; Uncertain or tentative taxa are in small text; ~~crossed out~~ taxa are discredited.

==== Dinosaurs ====
Dinosaurs reported from the Yezo Group
Genus	Species	Presence	Material	Notes	Images
Chupkaornis	C. keraorum	Kashima Formation (Coniacian to Santonian)	Cervical vertebrae, torso vertebrae, femur, and fibula	A hesperornithiform	
Kamuysaurus	K. japonicus	Hakobuchi Formation	A nearly complete skeleton with the skull and mandible (HMG-1219)	A hadrosaurid	
Nipponopelta	N. yezoensis	Hikagenosawa Formation. (Cenomanian)	A partial skull, teeth, osteoderms, and a cervical vertebra	A nodosaurid ankylosaur	
Nipponosaurus	N. sachalinensis	Sakhalin		A hadrosaurid	
Paralitherizinosaurus	P. japonicus	Osoushinai Formation	Partial vertebra and partial right hand	A therizinosaur	

==== Squamates ====
Turtles reported from the Yezo Group
Genus	Species	Presence	Material	Notes	Images
Anomalochelys	A. angulata	Hobetsu-cho, Hokkaido (Cenomanian)		A nanhsiungchelyid	
Mesodermochelys	M. undulatus	Hakobuchi Formation and upper part of the Osoushinai Formation	-NMV-3, a proximal half of right humerus (Osoushinai Formation)	A dermochelyid turtle	
Mesodermochelys	M. sp.	Osoushinai Formation.	A carapace with boreholes likely made by bivalves, and associated with many mollusc remains.	A dermochelyid turtle	

==== Lepidosaurs ====
Lepidosaurs reported from the Yezo Group
Genus	Species	Presence	Material	Notes	Images
Mosasaurus	M. hobetsuensis	Hakobuchi Formation		A mosasaurine mosasaur	
Phosphorosaurus	P. ponpetelegans	Hakobuchi Formation	A well-preserved skull with some associated vertebrae	A halisaurine mosasaur with proportionately large eyes and binocular vision	
Taniwhasaurus	T. mikasaensis	Kashima Formation	A fragmentary skull, not diagnostic to the species level	A tylosaurine mosasaur also known from New Zealand, Antarctica, and South Africa; originally informally named 'Yezosaurus mikasaensis'.	

==== Plesiosaurs ====
Plesiosaurs reported from the Yezo Group
Genus	Species	Presence	Material	Notes	Images
Pliosauridae indet.	Indeterminate	Cenomanian to Turonian localities in Hokkaido	Four indeterminate remains	Pliosaur remains, some with skull sizes comparable to Megacephalosaurus	

==== Pterosaurs ====
Pterosaurs reported from the Yezo Group
Genus	Species	Presence	Material	Notes	Images
Pterodactyloidea indet.	Indeterminate		Fragmentary femur, phalanx, and cervical vertebra	A large form with an estimated wingspan of 6.8 metres (22 ft)	

=== Fish ===
Fish reported from the Yezo Group
Genus	Species	Presence	Material	Notes	Images
Apsopelix	A. miyazakii	Nakagawa Town and Mikasa area, Hokkaido (Turonian)	2 specimens	A crossognathid	

=== Echinoderms ===
Echinoderms reported from the Yezo Group
Genus	Species	Presence	Material	Notes	Images
?Austinocrinus	?A. sp.	Unknown locality, possibly in south-central Hokkaido, thought to be Santonian-Campanian	One nodal and two pluricolumnals, associated on a bedding plane, so probably from a single individual	A crinoid	
?Balanocrinus	?B. sp.	Upper Coniacian-Campanian portions of the Haborogawa Formation)	One pluricolumnal	A crinoid	
Isocrinus	I. sp.	Haborogawa Formation (upper Turonian-Coniacian)	One pluricolumnal	A crinoid	
Isselicrinus	I. sp.	Campanian upper Yezo Group	One pluricolumnal and five very poorly preserved columnals		

=== Molluscs ===
Molluscs reported from the Yezo Group
Genus	Species	Presence	Material	Notes	Images
?Abyssochrysoidea indet.	Indeterminate	Osoushinai Formation	A single specimen found associated with the remains of a Mesodermochelys sp.	A gastropod	
Bivalvia indet.	Unidentified	Osoushinai Formation	A single specimen found associated with the remains of a Mesodermochelys sp.		
?Cephalaspidea indet.	Indeterminate	Osoushinai Formation	A single specimen found associated with the remains of a Mesodermochelys sp.	A gastropod	
Cheloniceras	C. sp.	Tsukenai Formation (Aptian)		An ammonite	
Colombiceras	C. spathi	Tsukenai Formation (Aptian)		An ammonite	
Gaudryceras	G. denseplicatum	Satonosawa Creek, Hokkaido (middle Turonian)		An ammonoid	
?Gyrodes	?G. sp.	Osoushinai Formation	A single specimen found associated with the remains of a Mesodermochelys sp.		
Haboroteuthis	H. poseidon	Upper Haborogawa Formation (Upper Santonian)	KMNH IvP 902,002, a lower jaw	A teuthid	
Hikidea	H. cf. yasukawensis	Osoushinai Formation	A single specimen found associated with the remains of a Mesodermochelys sp.		
Inoceramus	I. (Sphenoceramus) orientalis	Uppermost Haborogawa Formation (middle-upper part of the lower Campanian)		A bivalve	
Inoceramus	I. (Sphenoceramus) schmidti	Uppermost Haborogawa Formation (middle-upper part of the lower Campanian)		A bivalve	
Inoceramus	I. teshioensis	Gakkonosawa Creek, Hokkaido (late Turonian)	Disarticulated valves	A bivalve	
Nanaimoteuthis	N. haggarti	Uppermost Haborogawa Formation (lower Campanian)	KMNH IvP 902,001, a lower jaw, the only specimen available	A cirratan octopus	
Nanaimoteuthis	N. jeletzkyi	Hokkaido (Santonian to lower Campanian)		A cirratan octopus	
Nanaimoteuthis	N. yokotai	Satonosawa Creek and Gakkonosawa Creek, Hokkaido (middle and late Turonian)	Jaw fossils	A cirratan octopus	
Paleocirroteuthis	P. sp.	Hokkaido (Santonian to lower Campanian)		A cirroctopodid	
Provanna	P. cf. nakagawensis	Osoushinai Formation	3 specimens found associated with the remains of a Mesodermochelys sp.	An abyssochrysoid gastropod	
Rhytidoplites	R. adkinsi	Tsukenai Formation (Aptian)		An ammonite	
Scalarites	S. mihoensis	Gakkonosawa Creek, Hokkaido (late Turonian)		An ammonoid	
Scalarites	S. scalaris	Satonosawa Creek, Hokkaido (middle Turonian)		An ammonoid	
Tetragonites	T. glabrus	Satonosawa Creek, Hokkaido (middle Turonian)		An ammonoid	
Thyasira	T. tanabei	Osoushinai Formation	2 articulated specimens found associated with the remains of a Mesodermochelys sp.	A bivalve	
Yezoteuthis	Y. giganteus	Osoushinai Formation	Jaw fossils	A very large oegopsid	

=== Paleoflora ===
Color key: Taxon / Reclassified taxon / Taxon falsely reported as present / Dubious taxon or junior synonym / Ichnotaxon / Ootaxon / Morphotaxon	Notes; Uncertain or tentative taxa are in small text; ~~crossed out~~ taxa are discredited.

Plants reported from the Yezo Group
Genus	Species	Presence	Material	Notes	Images
Eydeia	E. hokkaidoensis	Haborogawa Formation (Coniacian-Santonian)	Five perimineralized fruits	A cornale similar to the extant Davidia involucrata	
Kamikistrobus	K. primulus	Gakkonosawa Creek, Hokkaido (late Turonian)		A bald cypress	
Mikasapteris	M. rothwellii	Mikasa Locality	A permineralized fertile pinnule	A probable stem polypodioid leptosporangiate fern	
Mukawastrobus	M. satoi	Hakobuchi Formation	A single cylindrical seed cone 2 cm long, 1.1 cm wide	A cypress	
Nilssonia	N. yezoensis	Hakobuchi Formation		A cycad	
Obirafructus	O. kokubunii	Haborogawa Formation (Coniacian to Santonian)	A permineralized reproductive axis bearing at least 42 spirally arranged follicles	A saxifragale	
Stockeystrobus	S. interdigitata	Hoborogawa Formation (Coniacian to Santonian)	A seed cone	A sequoioid	
Zamites	Z. bayeri	Kashima Formation (Coniacian)		A bennettitale	

== See also ==
- List of dinosaur-bearing rock formations
