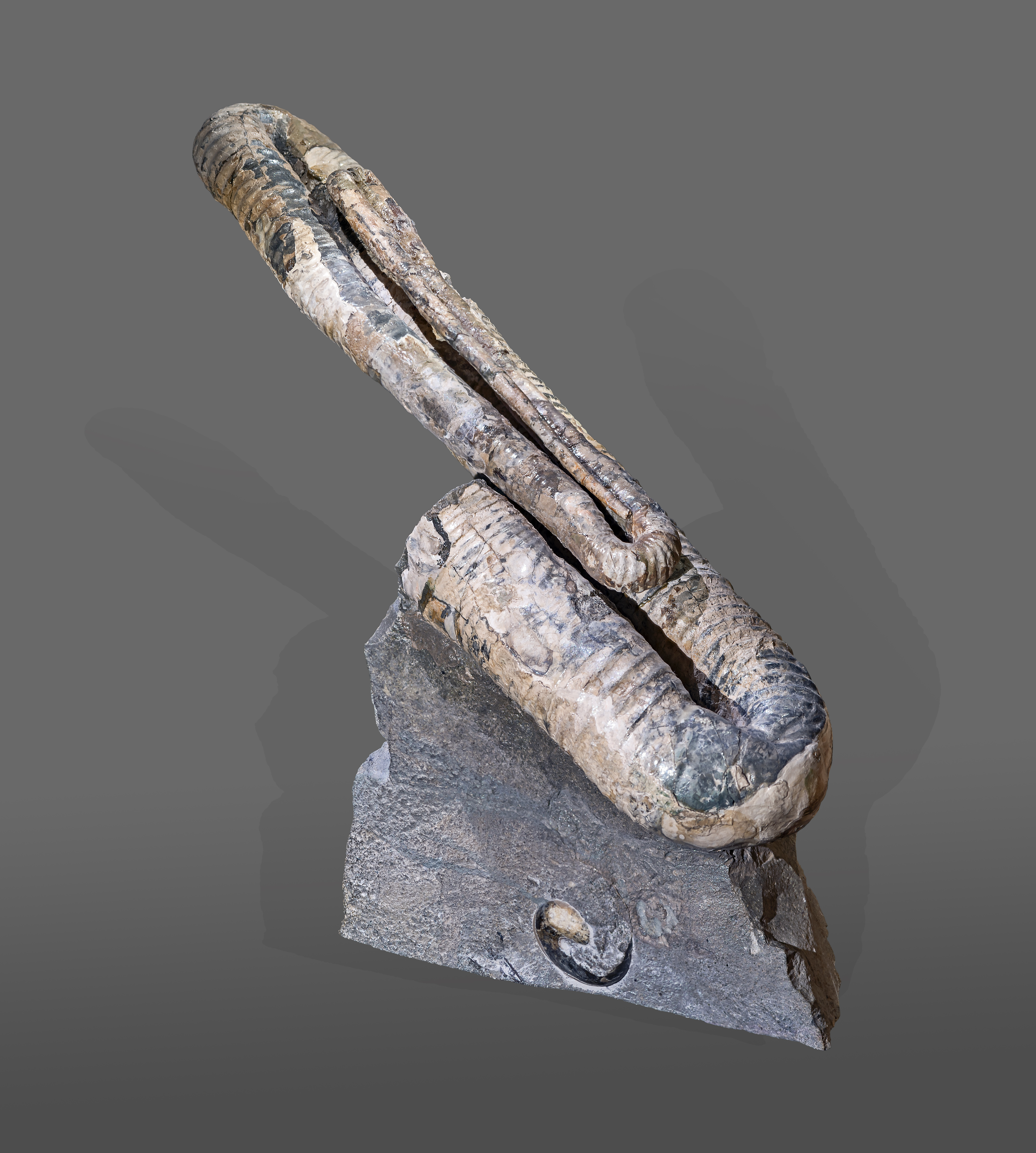
- Subptychoceras yubarense

Scientific classification
- Domain: Eukaryota
- Kingdom: Animalia
- Phylum: Mollusca
- Class: Cephalopoda
- Subclass: †Ammonoidea
- Order: †Ammonitida
- Suborder: †Ancyloceratina
- Family: †Diplomoceratidae
- Genus: †Polyptychoceras; Yabe, 1927

Species
- †P. mihoense; †P. pseudogaultinum; †P. haradanuin; †P. obatai; †P. obliquecostatum; †P. subunduratum; †P. vancouverensis; †P. obstrictum

= Polyptychoceras =

Polyptychoceras Temporal range: 89.3–70.6 Ma Late Cretaceous

Genus of molluscs (fossil)

Polyptychoceras is an extinct genus of ammonites from the Late Cretaceous of Asia, Europe, and North and South America. It was first named by Hisakatsu Yabe in 1927.

== Species and subspecies ==
This genus contains the following eight species and one subgenus, Subtychoceras, which contains one species.

- Polyptychoceras mihoense
- Polyptychoceras pseudogaultinum, could reach a length of 100 – 120 mm
- Polyptychoceras haradanum (Yokoyama)
- Polyptychoceras obatai
- Polyptychoceras obliquecostatum
- Polyptychoceras subunduratum
- Polyptychoceras obstrictum (Jimbo)
- Polyptychoceras vancouverensis, located around the Trent and Puntledge Rivers. Due to its shape, fossil poachers often call it the "paperclip ammonite" or "candy cane".
- Polyptychoceras (Subptychoceras) yubarense, could reach a maximum length of 200 mm

== Description ==
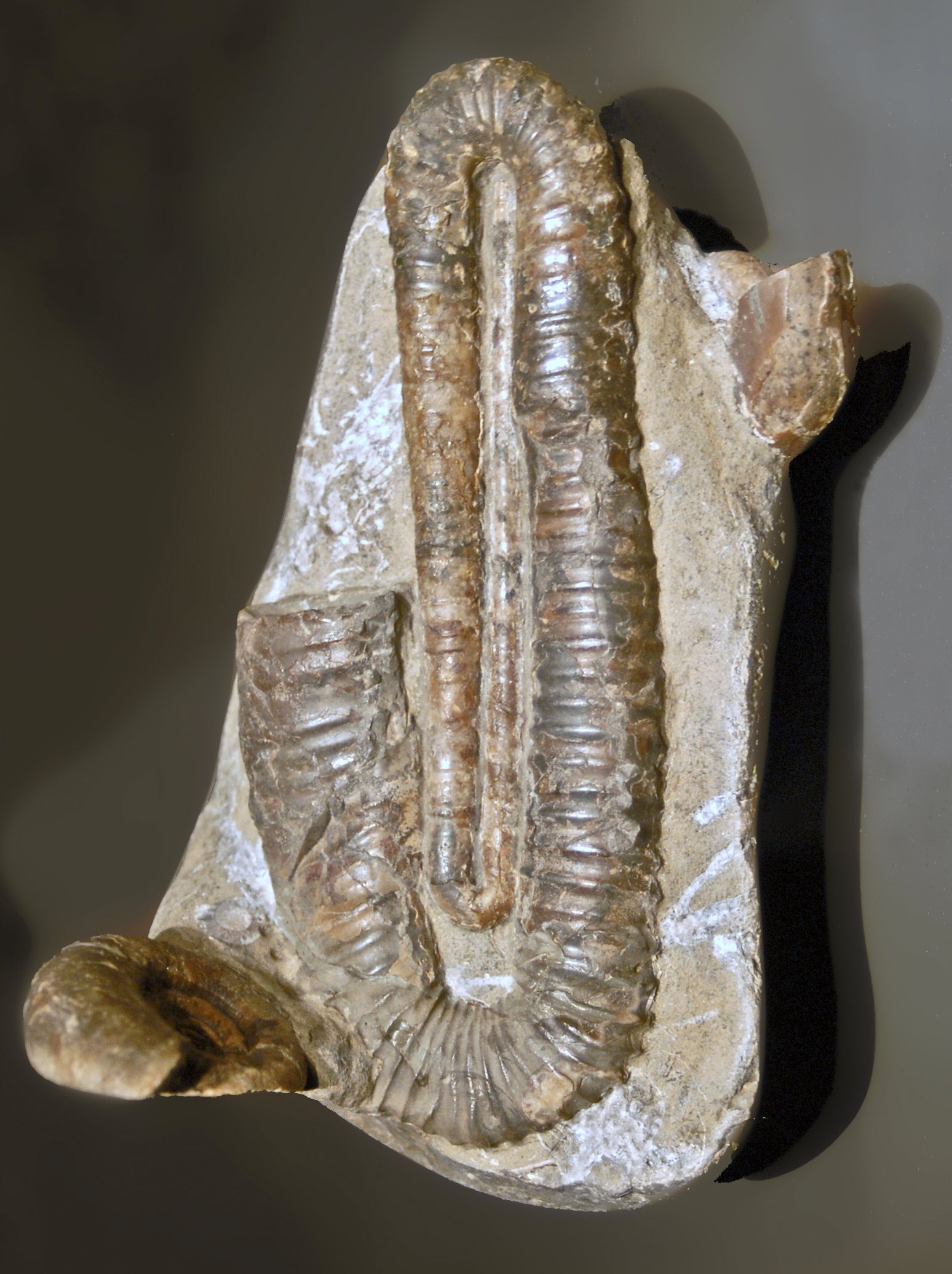
Fossil shell of Polyptychoceras on display at the Museo Civico di Storia Naturale di Milano

Polyptychoceras is a heteromorph ammonite, meaning that its shell does not curl up into the tight spiral shape which shells of ammonites from the subclass Ammonoidea typically do.

Polyptychoceras shells have an abrupt weight increase after formation of the initial shaft, which represents the shell's automatic balance condition. This would have caused the shell to topple over if on land. The soft body of the animal would have to have been large, in order to keep the falling shaft off of the ground. The body would not have been resistant to the pressing shell.

Although the shafts in the fossils of the shells are usually parallel to each other, small aberrations during each growth stage often caused abrupt constrictions in the shape of the shell.

== Life ==
A Japanese study in 1979 suggested that Polyptychoceras lived and travelled in schools, similarly to modern cuttlefish. Individual fossil specimens of a particular species of Polyptychoceras are frequently found in sediments laid down in the same bed of water, around the Santonian and Upper Coniacian faunal stages of the Late Cretaceous Epoch. Polyptychoceras was probably buoyant, and swam in a slow, somewhat up-and-down locomotion. It also likely preferred living in sheltered parts of deep sea levels, although how deep is uncertain. Subptychoceras yubarense was likely very long like an eel, and preferred a benthic mode of life.

== Distribution ==
Fossils of Polyptychoceras have been found in Angola, Antarctica, Argentina, Austria, Japan, Mexico, the Russian Federation, and the United States (California).
