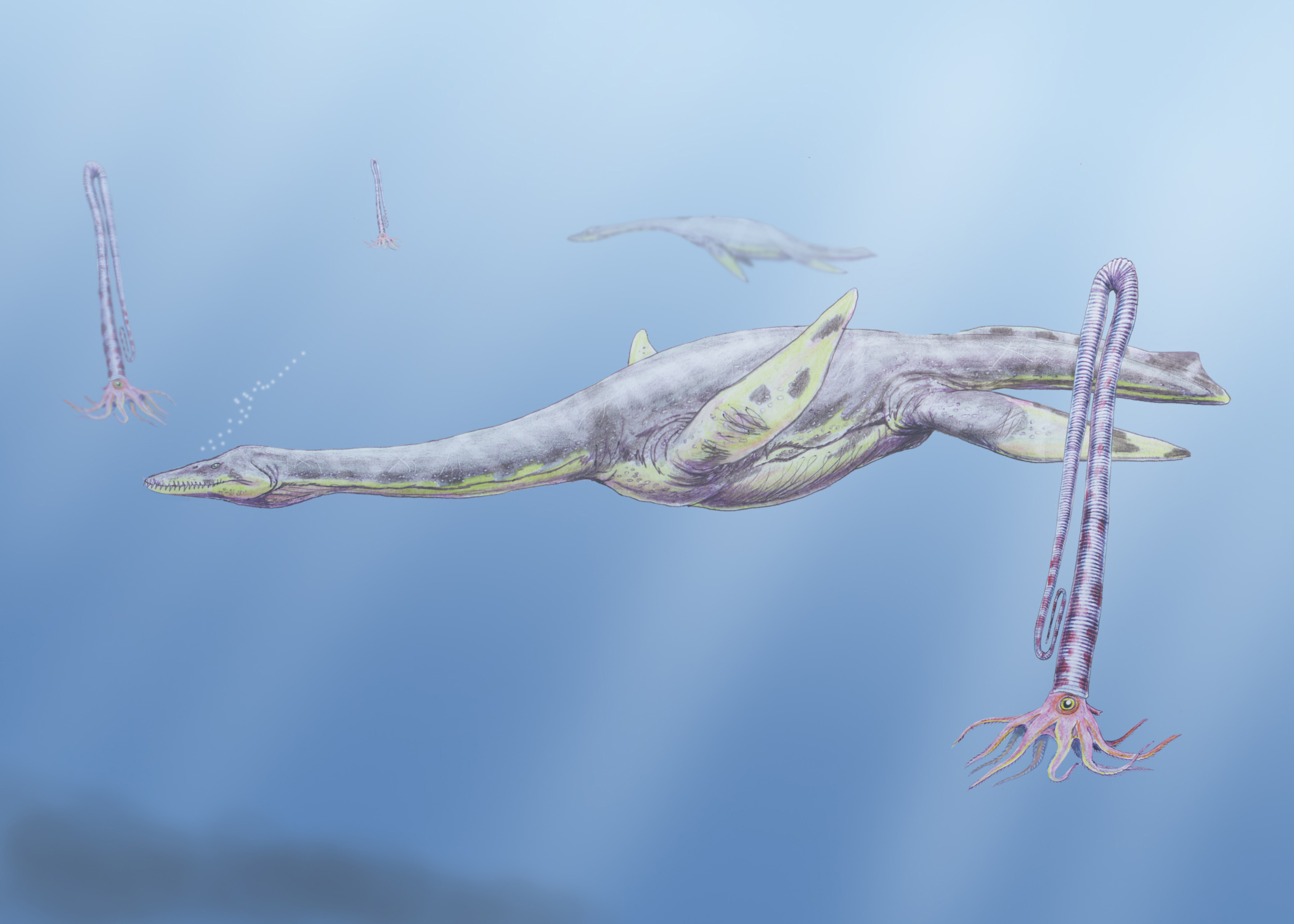
- Life restoration of Diplomoceras around Aristonectes

Scientific classification
- Kingdom: Animalia
- Phylum: Mollusca
- Class: Cephalopoda
- Subclass: †Ammonoidea
- Order: †Ammonitida
- Suborder: †Ancyloceratina
- Family: †Diplomoceratidae
- Genus: †Diplomoceras; Hyatt, 1900

Type species
- Diplomoceras cylindraceum Hyatt, 1900

Species
- †D. cascadense Anderson, 1958; †D. cylindraceum (DeFrance, 1816); †D. jimboi Anderson, 1958; †D. mercedense Anderson, 1958; †D. mustangense Anderson, 1958; †D. oshaughnessyi Anderson, 1958; †D. vernaculare Anderson, 1958

Synonyms
- Baculites cylindracea DeFrance, 1816

= Diplomoceras =

Diplomoceras Temporal range: Late Cretaceous, Campanian–Maastrichtian

Extinct genus of ammonites

Diplomoceras is a genus of ammonites included in the family Diplomoceratidae. Fossils of species within this genus have been found in the Late Cretaceous sediments (age range: Campanian-Maastrichtian). D. maximum had coiled shell length about 1.5 m (4.9 ft), uncoiled shell being 3 m (9.8 ft) to over 4 m (13 ft), with body chamber around 2 m (6.6 ft). Some partial specimens may belong to shell with length around 1.7 m (5.6 ft). Studies of Diplomoceras suggest that members of this genus could reach lifespans of over 200 years.
