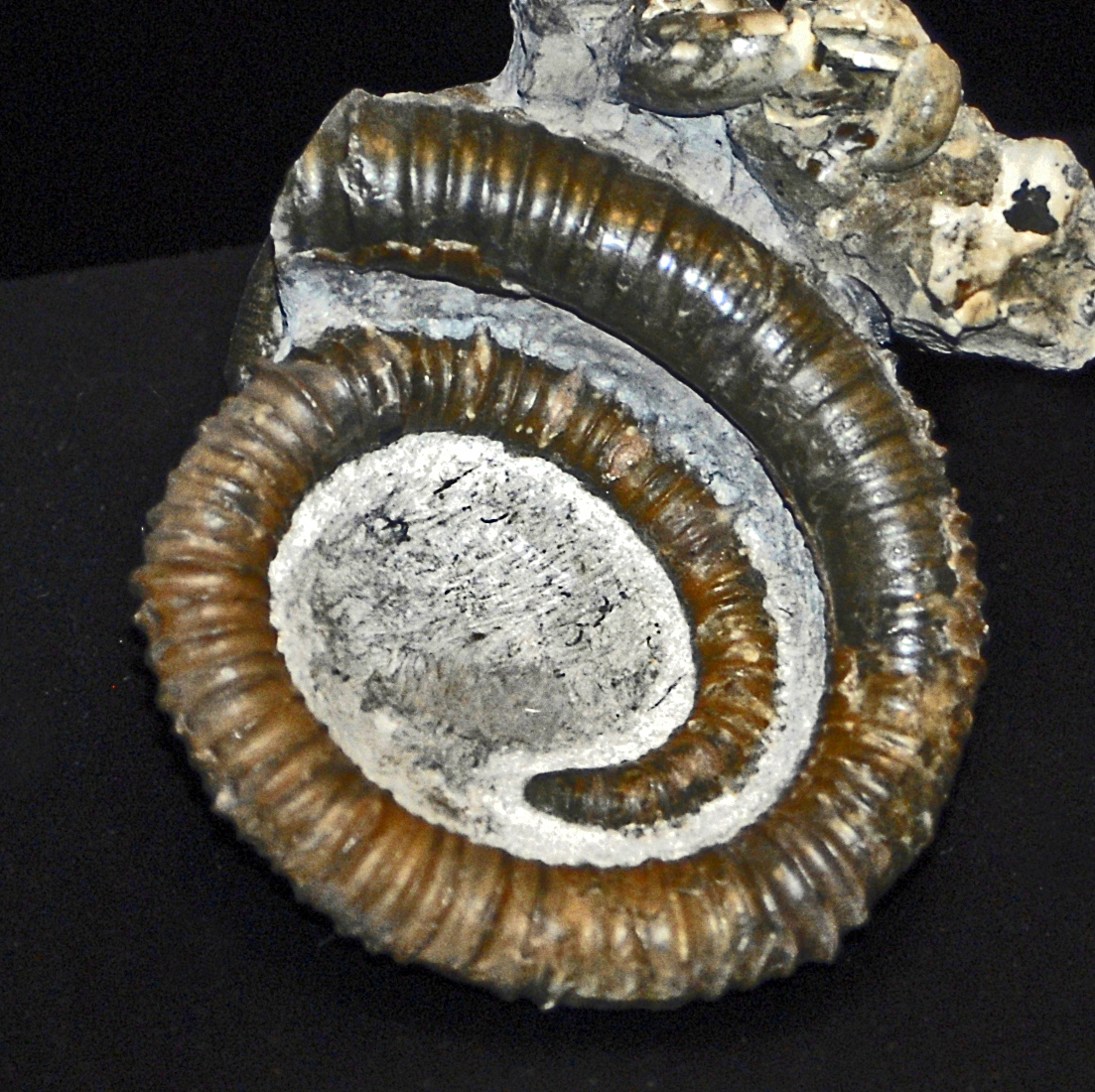
- Scalarites scalaris

Scientific classification
- Domain: Eukaryota
- Kingdom: Animalia
- Phylum: Mollusca
- Class: Cephalopoda
- Subclass: †Ammonoidea
- Order: †Ammonitida
- Suborder: †Ancyloceratina
- Superfamily: †Turrilitoidea
- Family: †Diplomoceratidae; Spath, 1926

= Diplomoceratidae =

Diplomoceratidae Temporal range: Cretaceous

Extinct family of ammonites

Diplomoceratidae is a family of ammonites included in the order Ammonitida. Fossils of species within this genus have been found in the Cretaceous sediments (age range: from 99.7 to 66.043 million years ago). Studies of Diplomoceras suggest that members of this family could reach lifespans of over 200 years.

== Genera ==
- Chesapeakella Kennedy and Cobban, 1993
- Diplomoceras Hyatt, 1900
- Glyptoxoceras Spath, 1925
- Neancyloceras Spath, 1926
- Scalarites Wright and Matsumoto, 1954
- Neoglyptoxoceras Collignon, 1969
- Phylloptychoceras Spath, 1953
- Oxybeloceras Hyatt, 1900
- Polyptychoceras Yabe, 1927
- Pseudoxybeloceras Wright and Matsumoto, 1954
- Solenoceras Conrad, 1860
