= Mukawa Town Hobetsu Museum =

- むかわ町立穂別博物館
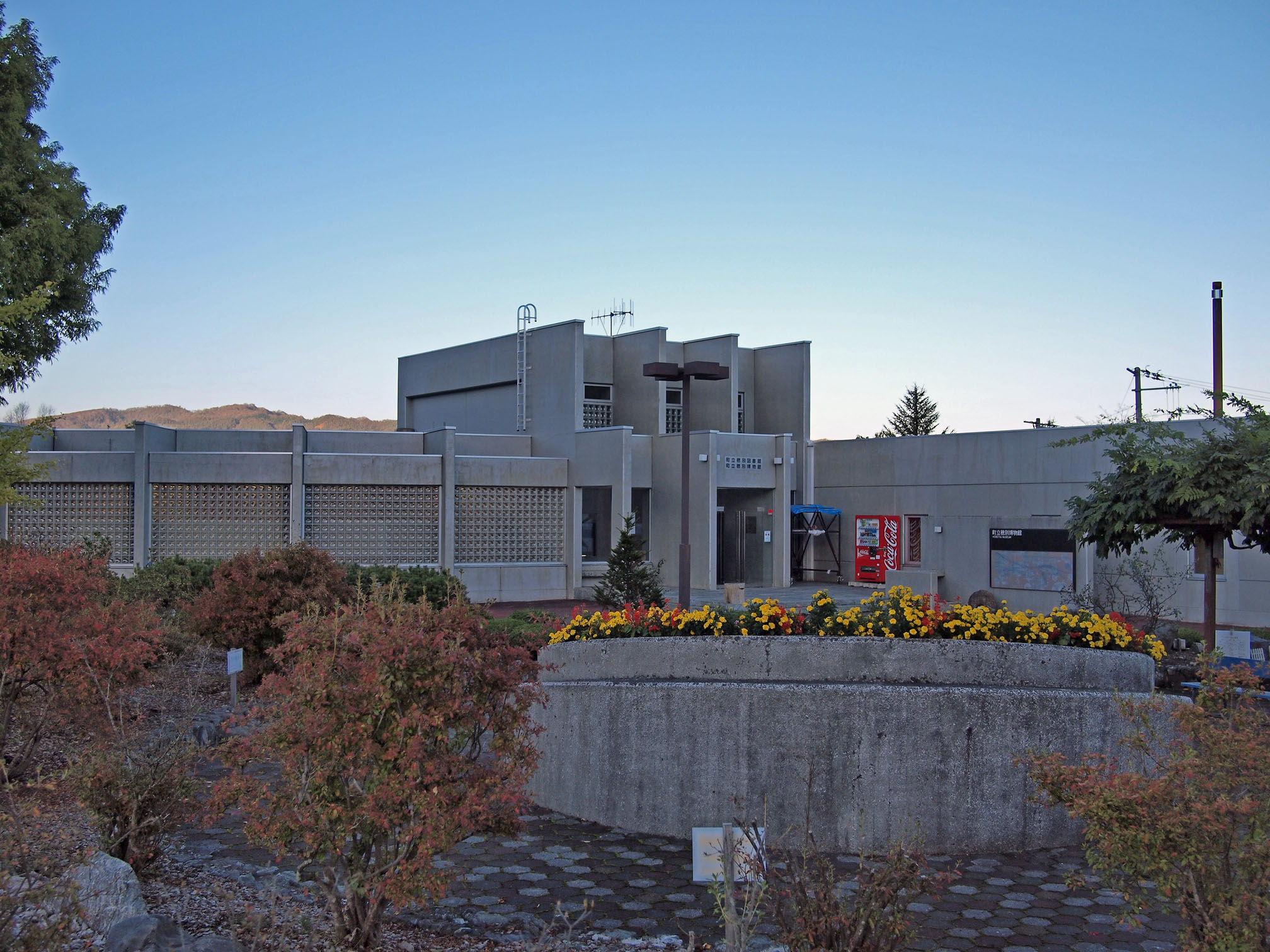
- Mukawa Town Hobetsu Museum

- Location within Japan

General information
- Location: 80-6, Hobetsu, Mukawa, Hokkaidō, Japan
- Coordinates: 42°45′59″N 142°08′09″E
- Opened: 20 July 1982

Website
- Official website

Mukawa Town Hobetsu Museum (むかわ町立穂別博物館, Mukawa Chōritsu Hobetsu Hakubutsukan) is a museum specializing in fossils in Mukawa, Hokkaidō, Japan. The Museum first opened in 1982 as the Hobetsu Museum (穂別博物館), in what was then the town of Hobetsu; with the merger into Mukawa in 2006, the Museum changed its name.

== Publications ==
- The Bulletin of the Hobetsu Museum (むかわ町穂別博物館研究報告) (1984—)

== See also ==
- Fukui Prefectural Dinosaur Museum
- Hokkaido Museum
