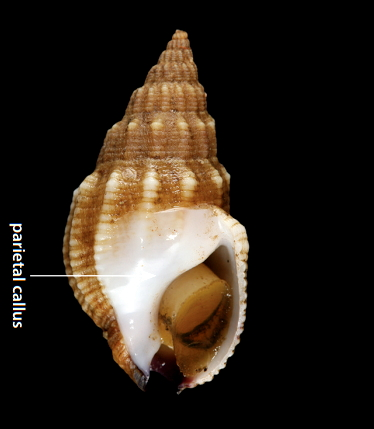
- Shell of Nassarius speciosus

Scientific classification
- Kingdom: Animalia
- Phylum: Mollusca
- Class: Gastropoda
- Subclass: Caenogastropoda
- Order: Neogastropoda
- Family: Nassariidae
- Genus: Nassarius
- Species: N. speciosus

Binomial name
- Nassarius speciosus (A. Adams, 1852)

Synonyms
- Alectrion plicosa (Dunker, 1846); Buccinum plicosum Dunker, 1846 (non Menke, 1830); Nassa plicosa (Dunker, 1846); Nassa speciosa A. Adams, 1852 (original combination); Nassarius (Niotha) speciosus (A. Adams, 1852); Nassarius plicosus (Dunker, 1846); Phos plicosus (Dunker, 1846)

= Nassarius speciosus =

Species of gastropod

Nassarius speciosus, common name the purple-lipped dogwhelk or the splendid nassa, is a species of sea snail, a marine gastropod mollusc in the family Nassariidae, the nassa mud snails or dog whelks.

== Description ==
The length of the shell varies between 20 mm and 35 mm.

The shell is small and robust, featuring strong, widely spaced axial ribs crossed by finer, closely spaced spiral cords. The whorls are shouldered, with the ribs creating nodules along the shoulder. On the latter part of the body whorl, the ribs become weaker. The aperture has a distinct siphonal notch, and the inner lip shows a well-developed callus that extends over both the columella and parietal region. The outer lip has a subterminal external thickening and low internal ridges.

The shell is whitish to buff, with paler axial ribs. The aperture and callus are white, while the siphonal notch is a dark purplish-brown when fresh. The surface of a living shell is often covered by a khaki-brown, periostracum-like layer formed by encrusting organisms.

== Distribution ==
This marine species is endemic to South Africa and occurs off the West coast to Agulhas Bank (southern Namibia to western Transkei), in shallow water to 130 m, possibly deeper.
