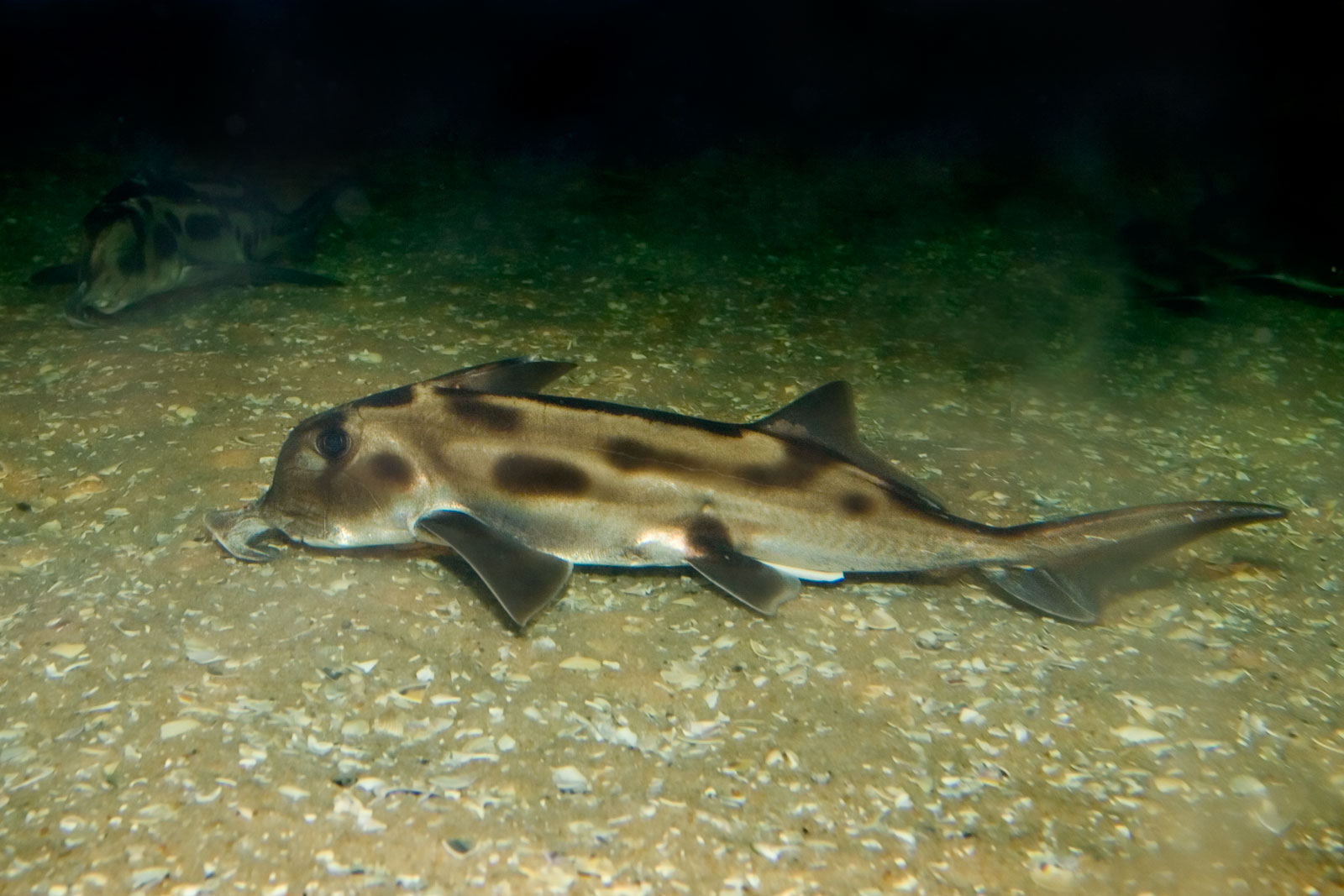
- Callorhinchus milii

Scientific classification
- Kingdom: Animalia
- Phylum: Chordata
- Class: Chondrichthyes
- Subclass: Holocephali
- Order: Chimaeriformes
- Family: Callorhinchidae; Garman, 1901
- Genus: Callorhinchus; Lacépède, 1798

Type species
- Chimaera calloryncha Linnaeus, 1758

Species
- C. callorynchus (Linnaeus, 1758); C. capensis A. H. A. Duméril, 1865; C. milii Bory de Saint-Vincent, 1823

= Callorhinchus =

Callorhinchus Temporal range: Albian–Recent

Genus of cartilaginous fishes

Callorhinchus, the plough-nosed chimaeras or elephantfish, are the only living genus in the family Callorhinchidae (sometimes spelled Callorhynchidae). A few extinct genera only known from fossil remains are recognized. Callorhinchus spp. are similar in form and habits to other chimaeras, but are distinguished by the presence of an elongated, flexible, fleshy snout, with a vague resemblance to a ploughshare. They are only found in the oceans of the Southern Hemisphere along the ocean bottom on muddy and sandy substrates. They filter feed, with small shellfish making up the bulk of their diet. The plough-nosed chimaera lays eggs on the ocean floor that hatch at around 8 months. They are currently not a target of conservation efforts; however, they may be susceptible to overfishing and trawling.

Plough-nose chimaeras are the only extant chimaeras that still inhabit relatively shallow neritic habitats, which are thought to have been the ancestral habitats for chimaeriforms up until the beginning of the Cenozoic. All other chimaera groups have since shifted their habitats into deeper waters.

== Morphology ==
Plough-nose chimaeras range from about 70 to 125 cm (2.30 to 4.10 ft) in total length. Their usual color is black or brown, and, often a mixture between the two. While the club-like snout makes elephantfish easy to recognize, they have several other distinctive features. They possess large pectoral fins, believed to aid in moving swiftly through the water. They also have two dorsal fins spaced widely apart, which help identify the species in the open ocean. In front of each pectoral fin is one single gill opening. Between the two dorsal fins is a spine, and the second dorsal fin is significantly smaller than the more anterior one. The caudal fin is divided into two lobes, the top one being larger. The eyes, set high on the head, are often green in color.

The snout is used to probe the sea bottom in search of the invertebrates and small fishes on which it preys. The remainder of the body is flat and compressed, often described as elongated. The mouth is just under this snout and the eyes are located high on top of the head. They have broad, flat teeth that have adapted for this eating habit, two pairs that reside in the upper jaw and one pair in the lower jaw.

In addition to its use for feeding, the "trunks" of the Callorhinchus fish can sense movement and electric fields, allowing them to locate their prey.

== Phylogeny ==
Phylogenetically, they are the oldest group of living jawed chondrichthyes. They possess the same cartilaginous skeleton seen in sharks, but are considered holocephalans to distinguish them from elasmobranchs, containing sharks and rays. Because of this, they provide a useful research organism for studying the early development of the jawed characteristic. Among the chondrichthyans, Callorhinchus has the smallest genome. Because of this, it has been proposed to be used for entire genome sequencing to represent the cartilaginous fish class. Their name comes from the fact that they share traits of both sharks and rays. They can be distinguished from sharks because they possess an operculum over their gill slits. Additionally, their skin is smooth, not covered in tough scales, characteristic of the shark. While the shark's jaw is loosely attached to the skull, the family Callorhinchidae differ in that their jaws are fused to their skulls.

== Distribution ==
Members of this genus are all found in subtropical and temperate waters in the Southern Hemisphere:

- Callorhinchus callorynchus resides off southern South American waters, ranging from Tierra del Fuego north to Peru (in the Pacific) and southern Brazil (in the Atlantic). It is fished for year-round in the waters off of Brazil and Argentina.
- Callorhinchus capensis is found in the oceans off southern Africa, including Namibia and South Africa.
- Callorhinchus milii is found in the southwestern Pacific Ocean near the coasts of Australia and New Zealand in warmer, more temperate waters. Still, in these temperate waters, the elephantfish reside in the cooler continental shelf. During the spring and summer, C. milii migrates to estuaries and inshore bays to mate.

== Physiology ==
The encephalization quotient is 1.1, compared to 6 in humans. Compared to humans, it has a larger cerebellum than forebrain. Its vision is very poor and the electrical sensing capabilities of the snout are predominantly used to find food. Both its circulatory and endocrine systems are similar to similar vertebrates, likely due to the early homologous structures the Callorhinchidae possess relative to the other Chondrichthyes.

== Diet ==
The Callorhinchidae are predominantly filter feeders, feeding on the sandy sediment of the ocean bottoms or continental shelves. The large protrusion of the snout aids in this task. Their diet consists of molluscs, more specifically, clams. Besides this, the Callorhinchidae have been shown to also feed on invertebrates such as jellyfish or small octopuses. They are considered to be incapable of eating bony fish, in that they cannot keep up with the teleosts' speed.

== Reproduction ==
The Callorhinchidae are oviparous. Mating and spawning happen during the spring and early summer. Males possess the characteristic claspers near the pelvic fin that are seen in sharks, and these are used to transport the gametes. They migrate to more shallow waters to spawn. Also, a club-like protrusion from the head is used to hold onto the female during mating. The keratinous eggs are released onto the muddy sediment of the ocean bottom, usually in shallower water. At first, the egg is a golden yellow color, but this transforms into brown, and finally, black right before hatching. The average time in the egg is 8 months, and the embryo uses the yolk for all nourishment. Once hatched, the young instinctively move to deeper water. The egg cases are long and flat, and resemble pieces of seaweed.

== Species ==
The family contains three extant species, all in the same genus:

- Callorhinchus callorynchus Linnaeus, 1758 (Ploughnose chimaera, American elephantfish, or cockfish)
- Callorhinchus capensis A. H. A. Duméril, 1865 (Cape elephantfish)
- Callorhinchus milii Bory de Saint-Vincent, 1823 (Australian ghostshark)

A number of fossil species are also known, extending back into the mid-Cretaceous (Albian).

== Fishery and conservation effort ==
Currently, no effort is being made to conserve the family Callorhinchidae, but the species are heavily fished for food in South America. Because of this, they are extremely susceptible to being overfished. The greatest risk to this species is trawling or net fishing. Using this method, large numbers are caught quickly. Once caught, the fish are sold as whitefish or silver trumpeter fillets. The most common location of export is Australia. Under the IUCN, two of the three extant species of Callorhinchidae are listed as least concern, as they remain common. Callorhinchus callorynchus is listed as Vulnerable. While fishing quotas are in place in Australia and New Zealand, this is the furthest that the conservation effort spans. Rarely, they are caught to be placed in aquaria, but this is much less common than fishery for food.
