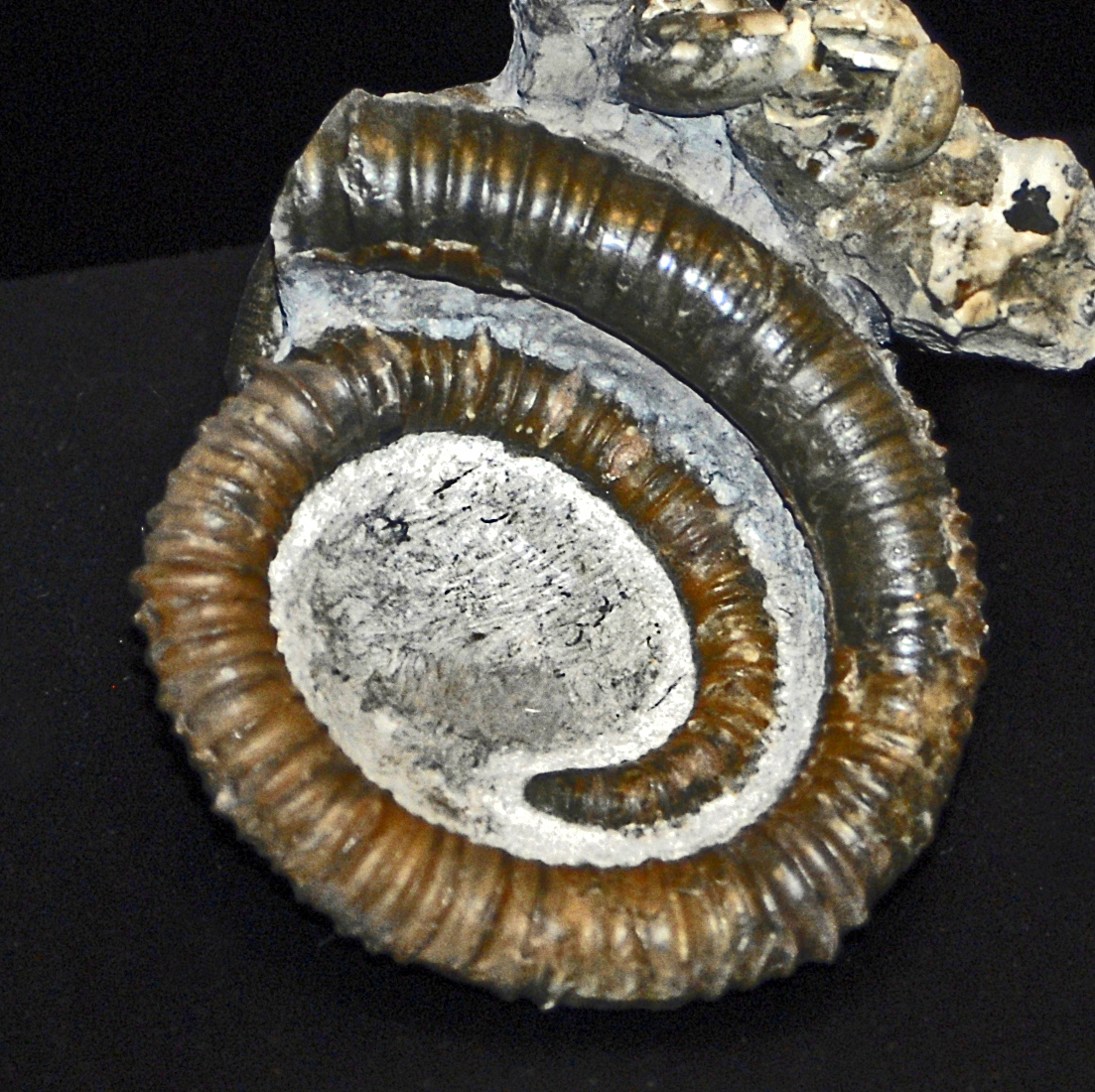
- Scalarites scalaris from Upper Cretaceous of Japan

Scientific classification
- Domain: Eukaryota
- Kingdom: Animalia
- Phylum: Mollusca
- Class: Cephalopoda
- Subclass: †Ammonoidea
- Order: †Ammonitida
- Suborder: †Ancyloceratina
- Family: †Diplomoceratidae
- Genus: †Scalarites; Wright and Matsumoto, 1954

= Scalarites =

Scalarites Temporal range: 89.3–70.6 Ma

Genus of molluscs (fossil)

Scalarites is a genus of heteromorph ammonites included in the family Diplomoceratidae. These fast-moving nektonic carnivores lived in the Cretaceous period, from 89.3 to 70.6 million years ago). These fossils have been found in Antarctica, Brazil, Denmark, Germany, Japan, Russia, Sweden and United States.

== Species ==
- Scalarites cingulatum (Schluter, 1872)
- Scalarites scalaris (Yabe)
