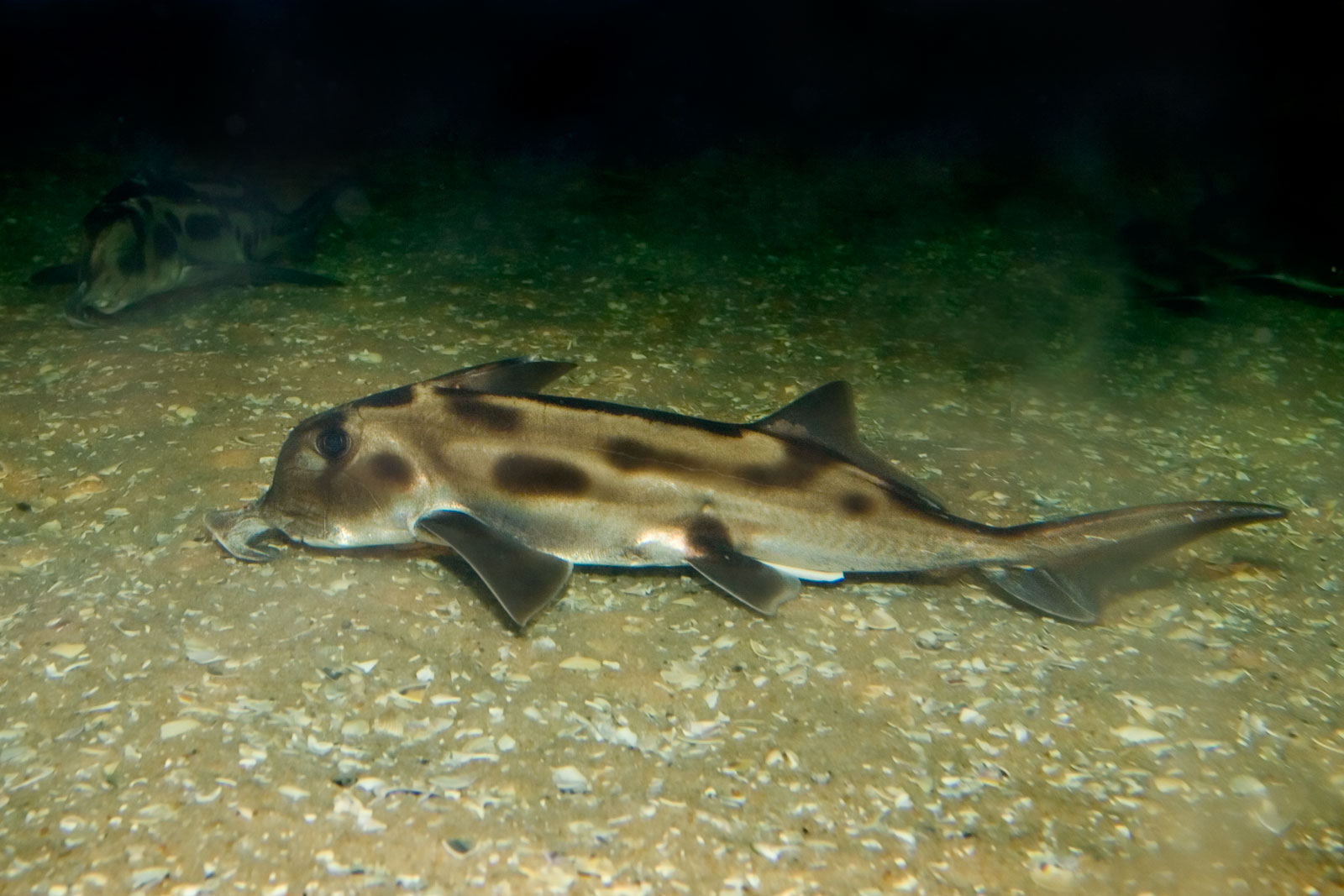
- Australian ghostshark at the Melbourne Aquarium

Conservation status
- Least Concern (IUCN 3.1)

Scientific classification
- Kingdom: Animalia
- Phylum: Chordata
- Class: Chondrichthyes
- Subclass: Holocephali
- Order: Chimaeriformes
- Family: Callorhinchidae
- Genus: Callorhinchus
- Species: C. milii

Binomial name
- Callorhinchus milii Bory de Saint-Vincent, 1823

= Australian ghostshark =

Species of cartilaginous fish

The Australian ghostshark (Callorhinchus milii) is a cartilaginous fish (Chondrichthyes) belonging to the subclass Holocephali (chimaera). Sharks, rays and skates are the other members of the cartilaginous fish group and are grouped under the subclass Elasmobranchii. Alternative names include elephant shark, makorepe (in Māori), whitefish, plough-nose chimaera, or elephant fish. It is found off southern Australia, including Tasmania, and south of East Cape and Kaipara Harbour in New Zealand, at depths of 0–200 m (0–656 ft). Despite several of its names, it is not a shark, but a member of a closely related group.

== Morphology and biology ==
The fish is silvery in colour with iridescent reflections and dark, variable markings on the sides. Males mature at 50 cm (1.6 ft) and females at 70 cm (2.3 ft), and the maximum length head to tail is 1.5 m (4.9 ft). It has an elongated body, which is smooth and torpedo shaped, with two widely separated, triangular dorsal fins. They use their hoe-shaped snouts to probe the ocean bottom for invertebrates and small fishes.

From spring to autumn, adults migrate inshore to estuaries and bays and females lay their eggs on sandy or muddy substrates. The eggs are contained in large yellowish capsules. After a few months, the egg case partially opens, enabling seawater to flow in to the egg. Juveniles emerge from the capsule after six to eight months at about 12 cm (4.7 in) in length. Maximum age is estimated to be 15 years.

This fish has three cone pigments for colour vision (like humans). Its dorsal fin has a very sharp spine. The spine has been reputed to be venomous, but no serious injuries have yet been reported.

== Distribution ==
At present this species is considered native to the waters of southern Australia and New Zealand. However, it has been hypothesized that the New Zealand population and the Australian population may actually be separate species.

== Fishing ==
In South Australia, they are caught by some recreational fishers in inshore waters during autumn and winter, typically from surf beaches or sheltered beaches.

In New Zealand, Australian ghostsharks are exploited commercially, particularly during spring and summer when they migrate into shallow coastal waters.

In Australia, they are caught by southern shark gillnet fishery, particularly in Bass Strait and south-east Tasmania, though this fishery targets the gummy shark, Mustelus antarcticus, and will sometimes discard ghostsharks due to the considerably lower price they fetch at market. They are also a popular target of recreational fishers in Westernport Bay, Victoria and in the inshore waters of south-east Tasmania. Their white flesh fillets are very popular with fish-and-chips restaurants in New Zealand and is sold as 'flake' or 'whitefish' in Australia.

== Genome study ==
In January 2014, Venkatesh and colleagues reported research into the Australian ghostshark genome that showed they lack a single gene family that regulates the process of turning cartilage into bone, and indicates a gene duplication event gave rise to the transformation in bony vertebrates.

The Australian ghostshark was proposed as a model cartilaginous fish genome because of its relatively small genome size. Its genome is estimated to be 910 megabases long, which is the smallest among all the cartilaginous fish and one-third the size of the human genome (3000 Mb). Because cartilaginous fish are the oldest living group of jawed vertebrates, the Australian ghostshark genome will serve as a useful reference genome for understanding the origin and evolution of vertebrate genomes including humans, which shared a common ancestor with the Australian ghostshark about 450 million years ago. Studies so far have shown the sequence and the gene order (synteny) are more similar between human and elephant shark genomes than between human and teleost fish genomes (pufferfish and zebrafish), though humans are more closely related to teleost fish than to the Australian ghostshark. The Elephant Shark Genome Project was launched with the aim to sequence the whole genome of the elephant shark.

== Conservation status ==
The New Zealand Department of Conservation has classified the Australian ghost shark as "Not Threatened" with the qualifier "Conservation Dependent, Increasing" under the New Zealand Threat Classification System.

== Bibliography ==
- Yoshinao Katsu; Satomi Kohno; Kaori Oka; Xiaozhi Lin; Sumika Otake; Nisha E. Pillai; Wataru Takagi; Susumu Hyodo; Byrappa Venkatesh; Michael E. Baker (2018). "Transcriptional Activation of Elephant Shark Mineralocorticoid Receptor by Corticosteroids, Progesterone and Spironolactone". Science Signaling. 12 (584): eaar2668. arXiv:1808.07539.
