= Hobetsu, Hokkaido =

Dissolved municipality in Hokkaido, Japan

Coordinates: 42.76122°N 142.13375°E

Hobetsu 穂別町 ほべつちょう
- Town
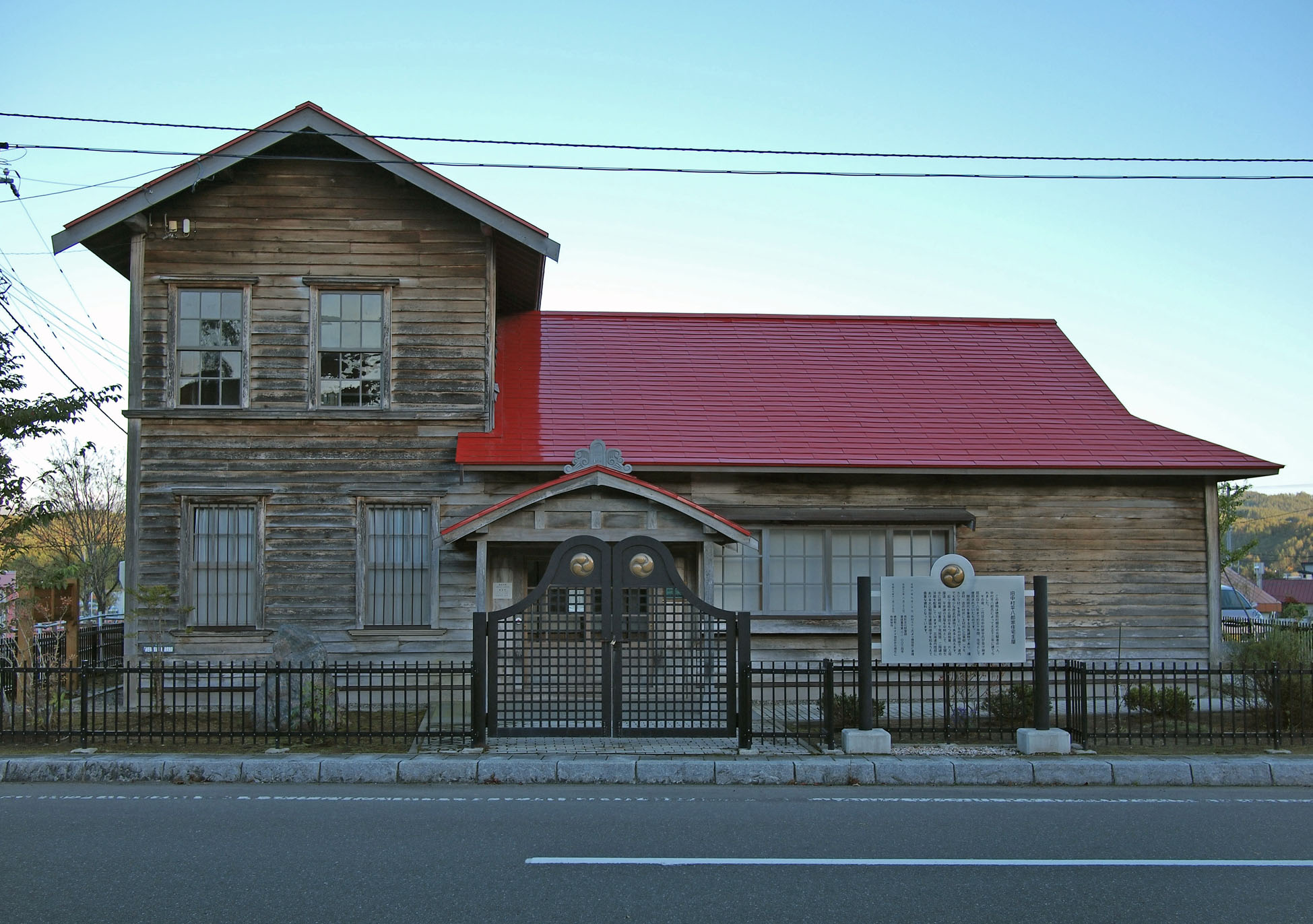
- Former Nakamura Heihachiro family house

- Flag Seal
- Interactive map of Hobetsu
- Country: Japan
- Region: Hokkaido
- Prefecture: Hokkaido
- Subprefecture: Iburi
- District: Yūfutsu

Area
  - Total: 546.48 km^{2} (211.00 sq mi)

Population (2004)
  - Total: 3,727
  - Density: 6.820/km^{2} (17.66/sq mi)

Hobetsu (穂別町, Hobetsu-chō) was a town located in Yūfutsu (Iburi) District, Iburi Subprefecture, Hokkaido, Japan.

As of 2004, the town had an estimated population of 3,727 and a density of 6.82 persons per km^{2}. The total area is 546.48 km^{2}.

On March 27, 2006, Hobetsu was merged into the expanded town of Mukawa (鵡川町 Mukawa-chō).

Train service has been discontinued to this town, although it can be accessed via the public bus system. By car, Hobetsu is located approximately 30 to 40 minutes north of Mukawa along Route 74.

== Recreation ==
The town features a dinosaur museum, Earth Experience Hall, and historic home. A small park near the Mukawa River, a small park off the main road, and larger park in the north of the town feature dinosaur sculptures. Public bathrooms can be accessed at all of the town's parks. However, only the bathroom at the park off the main road can be accessed year-round. A local park golf course is another recreational center available to the public.

A town ski hill and speed skating rink are available for use during the Winter season. Both are free of charge.

Farther along Route 74, Hobetsu's northern area, Inasato, features an onsen and seasonal camp ground.

== Climate ==
Climate data for Hobetsu (1991−2020 normals, extremes 1977−present)
| Month | Jan | Feb | Mar | Apr | May | Jun | Jul | Aug | Sep | Oct | Nov | Dec | Year |
|---|---|---|---|---|---|---|---|---|---|---|---|---|---|
| Record high °C (°F) | 7.9 (46.2) | 11.3 (52.3) | 17.7 (63.9) | 25.4 (77.7) | 30.8 (87.4) | 32.6 (90.7) | 34.0 (93.2) | 34.3 (93.7) | 31.6 (88.9) | 24.9 (76.8) | 20.4 (68.7) | 14.3 (57.7) | 34.3 (93.7) |
| Mean daily maximum °C (°F) | −0.9 (30.4) | 0.1 (32.2) | 4.1 (39.4) | 11.4 (52.5) | 17.7 (63.9) | 21.3 (70.3) | 24.5 (76.1) | 25.7 (78.3) | 22.4 (72.3) | 16.0 (60.8) | 8.2 (46.8) | 1.2 (34.2) | 12.6 (54.8) |
| Daily mean °C (°F) | −8.1 (17.4) | −7.1 (19.2) | −1.6 (29.1) | 5.1 (41.2) | 11.3 (52.3) | 15.6 (60.1) | 19.5 (67.1) | 20.4 (68.7) | 16.2 (61.2) | 9.1 (48.4) | 2.4 (36.3) | −4.7 (23.5) | 6.5 (43.7) |
| Mean daily minimum °C (°F) | −15.8 (3.6) | −15.5 (4.1) | −8.3 (17.1) | −1.2 (29.8) | 5.1 (41.2) | 10.8 (51.4) | 15.7 (60.3) | 16.4 (61.5) | 10.9 (51.6) | 3.3 (37.9) | −2.7 (27.1) | −10.7 (12.7) | 0.7 (33.2) |
| Record low °C (°F) | −30.2 (−22.4) | −30.3 (−22.5) | −27.8 (−18.0) | −13.2 (8.2) | −3.4 (25.9) | 0.4 (32.7) | 5.6 (42.1) | 6.4 (43.5) | 0.3 (32.5) | −5.5 (22.1) | −15.5 (4.1) | −28.6 (−19.5) | −30.3 (−22.5) |
| Average precipitation mm (inches) | 43.2 (1.70) | 37.1 (1.46) | 58.5 (2.30) | 83.1 (3.27) | 110.9 (4.37) | 86.4 (3.40) | 133.2 (5.24) | 201.3 (7.93) | 152.4 (6.00) | 106.0 (4.17) | 97.9 (3.85) | 63.6 (2.50) | 1,173.5 (46.20) |
| Average snowfall cm (inches) | 130 (51) | 110 (43) | 83 (33) | 9 (3.5) | 0 (0) | 0 (0) | 0 (0) | 0 (0) | 0 (0) | 0 (0) | 16 (6.3) | 101 (40) | 451 (178) |
| Average precipitation days (≥ 1.0 mm) | 10.3 | 9.9 | 10.6 | 12.0 | 11.4 | 8.8 | 10.7 | 11.3 | 11.2 | 11.8 | 12.8 | 11.8 | 132.6 |
| Average snowy days | 18.1 | 16.4 | 12.6 | 1.5 | 0 | 0 | 0 | 0 | 0 | 0.1 | 1.8 | 13.4 | 63.9 |
| Mean monthly sunshine hours | 125.1 | 121.3 | 160.1 | 173.2 | 197.6 | 173.2 | 139.3 | 149.4 | 167.0 | 150.8 | 111.5 | 113.4 | 1,782 |
Source: JMA

== Population ==
The overall population of the Hobetsu area has faced a decline in recent years. In 1995 the population was 4,114 people, with a total of 1,557 households. In 2000, the population declined to 3,965, while the number of households remained at 1,557. The 2005 population was 3,837, while the number of households increased to 1,656.

== Employment ==
As of 2006, the workforce in the Hobetsu area totaled 1,981 people. The following figures indicate the different types of employment within the overall workforce, and the number of people employed.

Official Business: 135
Real Estate: 2
Service: 522
Circulation of Money & Insurance: 12
Wholesale Trade & Retail: 217
Transportation & Communication: 80
Electricity, Gas, Thermal Supply & Aqueduct: 4
Production: 100
Construction: 302
Mining: 12
Forestry: 112
Farming: 483

== Land Usage ==
The 2006 Handbook does not distinguish between Hobetsu or Mukawa regarding land usage. The areas of Hobetsu (546.48 km^{2}), and Mukawa (166.43 km^{2}) total to 712.91 km^{2}. Of this total area, the land usage is divided into the following categories:

Housing Site: 5.39 km^{2}
Wilderness: 9.75 km^{2}
Mixed-breed Area: 9.93 km^{2}
Ranch: 13.64 km^{2}
Fields with Crops: 18.9 km^{2}
Rice Fields: 38.51 km^{2}
Swamp: 0.09 km^{2}
Forest: 517.81 km^{2}
Other: 98.89 km^{2}

== Annual Expenditure ==
As with the proceeding information, the following comes from the Mukawa 2006 Handbook. The following information regarding the 2005, or Heisei 17, town expenditures does not consider Mukawa and Hobetsu separately. Monetary amounts are expressed in the style of the Mukawa Handbook; 億 equals one hundred million, 万 equals ten thousand, and 円 is the symbol for the Japanese Yen.

Hygienic (衛生費): 9億2,530万円 (10.1%)
Intersection Bond (公債費): 16億399万円 (17.6%)
National Welfare (民生費): 16億5,138万円 (18.2%)
General Affairs (総務費): 14億7,607万円 (16.2%)
Engineering Works (土木費): 8億6,944万円 (9.5%)
Education (教育費): 6億8,774万円 (7.6%)
Commercial (商工費): 2億7,896万円 (3.1%)
Agriculture, Forestry & Marine Products (農林水産費): 3億5,302万円 (9.4%)
Fire Fighting (消防費): 5億8,283万円 (6.4%)
National Assembly (議会費): 1億4,210万円 (1.6%)
Others: 1,988万円 (0.3%)
Total: 90億8,891万円
